= Nyagak II Hydroelectric Power Station =

Nyagak II Power Station
- Map of Uganda showing the location of Nyagak II Power Station
- Country: Uganda
- Location: Paidha
- Coordinates: 02°30′00″N 30°59′24″E
- Status: Proposed

Dam and spillways
- Impounds: Nyagak River

Reservoir
- Normal elevation: 1,380 m (4,530 ft)

Power Station
- Commission date: 2017 (expected)
- Type: Run-of-the-river
- Turbines: 2
- Installed capacity: (planned) 5 MW (6,700 hp)

Nyagak II Power Station is a 5 megawatts (6,700 hp) proposed mini hydroelectric power project in Uganda.

== Location ==
The power station would be located across the Nyagak River, in Rateng Village, Paidha Sub County, Okoro County, Zombo District, West Nile Sub-Region, Northern Region of Uganda. This location is near the town of Paidha, close to the border with the Democratic Republic of the Congo (DRC), approximately 10 kilometres (6.2 mi) downstream of the existing Nyagak I Power Station.

== Overview ==
During the construction of the Nyagak I Power Station (2006 - 2012), it became clear that its 3.5 megawatt output was inadequate to meet the electricity needs of the West Nile sub-region. In addition, the towns of Aruu and Mahagi in the DRC had expressed the desire to be supplied with electricity from neighboring Uganda.

To meet those needs while awaiting the construction of the 600 megawatt Karuma Power Station, the government of Uganda authorized construction of the Nyagak II Power Station as a bridge measure. The available literature suggests that the government will fund this development independently. It appears that this power station is separate from the Nyagak III Power Station, which will be developed through a Public Private Partnership.

== Construction costs ==
While the exact construction costs of the Nyagak II Power Station have not been disclosed, the Nyagak I Power Station cost US$18 million (€14 million) to complete in 2012. The power generated will be evacuated via the existing 33 kilovolt transmission power lines linking the towns of Paidha, Nebbi, Bondo, Okollo, and Arua, constructed at an estimated cost of US$15 million between 2006 and 2012 during the development of Nyagak I. The power lines will also be extended to Pakwach on the banks of the Albert Nile, with funding from a US$18 million (€13 million) grant from KfW.

== See also ==
- List of power stations in Uganda
- List of hydropower stations in Africa
