= Bondo, Uganda =

Bondo
- Map of Uganda showing the location of Bondo; Placement on map is approximate
- Coordinates: 02°47′00″N 30°58′00″E
- Country: Uganda
- Region: Northern Uganda
- Sub-region: West Nile sub-region
- District: Arua District
- Time zone: UTC+3 (EAT)

Bondo is a town in Uganda.

== Location ==
Bondo is located in Arua District, West Nile sub-region, in Northern Uganda. It lies approximately 29 kilometres (18 mi), by road, southeast of Arua, the largest town in the sub-region, on the Arua - Nebbi Highway. The coordinates of the town are: 02 47 00N, 30 58 00E.

== Overview ==
The town lies on the Arua-Nebbi Highway which continues on to Gulu, the largest city in Northern Uganda. Bondo also lies along the path of the 33kV electric power line from Nyagak Power Station in Paidha, Nebbi District, connecting to Arua, through Nebbi, Okollo and Bondo.

== Points of interest ==
Some of the points of interest in the town include the following:

- The offices of Bondo Town Council
- Bondo Central Market
- The Arua-Gulu Road - The all-tarmac road passes through the middle of town
- The 33kV electric power line from Paidha, Zombo District to Arua, Arua District - The power transmission line also passes through Nebbi in Nebbi District and through Okollo in Arua District.

== See also ==
- Nyagak Power Station
- Nyagak II Power Station
- Nyagak III Power Station
- Paidha
