= Nyagak River =

River located in Northern Uganda

Nyagak river is a river of West Nile, Northern Uganda.

== Location ==
The Nyagak river runs through Zombo District and Arua District. It is a tributary of the Ora River, which it joins east of the town of Okollo.

== Hydropower ==
Several hydropower developments are located on the Nyagak river :

- Nyagak Power Station
- Nyagak II Power Station
- Nyagak III Power Station
