= Holy Family Hospital Nyapea =

Community hospital in Uganda

- Uganda Catholic Medical Bureau

Geography
- Location: Nyapea, Zombo District, Northern Region, Uganda
- Coordinates: 02°27′44″N 30°57′02″E

Organisation
- Type: Community

Services
- Emergency department: I
- Beds: 137

History
- Founded: 1985; 41 years ago

Links
- Other links: Hospitals in Uganda; Medical education in Uganda

Holy Family Hospital Nyapea, commonly referred to as Nyapea Hospital, is a faith-based community hospital in Nyapea, Zombo District, in the Northern Region of Uganda. It is a private, non-profit, hospital, serving the town of Nyapea and surrounding areas of West Nile sub-region.

== Location ==
The hospital is located in the town of Nyapea, off of the Pakwach–Arua Road. This location is approximately 100 kilometres (62 mi), by road, south of Arua Regional Referral Hospital, in the city of Arua.

Nyapea Hospital, is approximately 203 kilometres (126 mi), by road, southwest of Gulu Regional Referral Hospital, in the city of Gulu, the largest city in Northern Uganda. The hospital is about 10 kilometres (6 mi), by road, southeast of the town of Zombo, where the district headquarters are located. The geographical coordinates of Nyapea Hospital are: 02°27'44.0"N, 30°57'02.0"E (Latitude:02.462222; Longitude:30.950556).

== Overview ==
Nyapea Hospital is a rural faith-based, non-profit community hospital, affiliated with the Uganda Catholic Medical Bureau. Established in 1985, the hospital has a bed capacity of 137. Holy Family Hospital Nyapea averaged 16,106 outpatient visits annually, as of December 2019. At that time, the hospital averaged 5,662 inpatient admissions, annually, with a bed occupancy ratio of 34.8 percent. An average of 1,194 maternal deliveries were attended to annually, with a caesarian section rate of 47.6 percent. This high rate of caesarian births is attributed to the short stature of the mothers and the associated narrow pelvises that they have.

Patient user-fees amount to approximately 22.5 percent of total hospital annual income, on average. The hospital faces two major challenges; one being unreliable electricity supply and the other being lack of adequate potable water supply.

== See also ==
- List of hospitals in Uganda
