= West Nile Rural Electrification Company =

West Nile Rural Electrification Company (WENRECO)
- Company type: Private
- Industry: Electric power generation, and distribution
- Founded: 2003
- Headquarters: Arua, Uganda
- Products: Electricity

West Nile Rural Electrification Company Limited (WENRECO) is an electric energy generating and distribution company in the West Nile sub-region of the Northern Region of Uganda. WENRECO is a wholly owned subsidiary of Industrial Promotion Services (IPS), the industrial development arm of the Aga Khan Fund for Economic Development (AKFED). AKFED is a member of the Aga Khan Development Network.

== Overview ==
In 2003, WENRECO, through competitive bidding, won a concession to generate, distribute, and sell electricity in the West Nile sub-region, consisting of eight districts and home to an estimated 2.3 million people. The company owns a 1.5 megawatt heavy fuel electric generator and is part-owner and operator of the Nyagak I Power Station.

WENRECO is the implementer and co-funder of the West Nile Rural Electrification Project, which was initiated in 2013. The project targeted electrification of 30 health centers, 60 schools, 250 businesses, and 6,000 households between 2013 and 2015. Funding for the project was provided by the government of Uganda, KfW, WENRECO, and the Energy Facility Pooling Mechanism.

In 2013, WENRECO began switching the 4,000 customers that it had at that time to pre-paid metering service.

== Power stations ==
WENRECO operates two power stations: WENRECO heavy fuel thermal plant with a capacity of 1.5 megawatts, located in Ewuata, Arua District; and the Nyagak I Power Station, a 3.5 megawatt mini-hydropower station, located in Paidha, Zombo District. These facilities are the main public electric power sources available to the West Nile sub-region, which is not yet connected to the national grid. Connection to the national grid is expected following the completion of the Karuma Hydroelectric Power Station around 2020.

== Photographs ==
- Photograph of WENRECO 1.5 Megawatts Heavy Fuel Power Station In Arua, Uganda

== See also ==
- Electricity Regulatory Authority
- Nyagak II Power Station
- Nyagak III Power Station
