= Okollo =

- Map of Uganda showing the location of Okollo.
- Coordinates: 02°39′15″N 31°08′44″E
- District: Arua District
- Elevation: 800 m (2,600 ft)
- Time zone: UTC+3 (EAT)

Okollo is a town council in the Northern Region and a key area in Madi-Okollo District, a region in the West-Nile sub-region in northwestern Uganda. This district was carved out of Arua district in 2019. Okollo has a population of 7,088 according to 2024 census carried out on 5-10-2024.Population census revealed that females are 3,710 and men are 3,378 stating clearly that females are more than males

== Location ==
Okollo is located approximately 58 kilometres (36 mi), by road, southeast of Arua, the largest city in the sub-region, on the Arua-Nebbi Highway which continues on to Gulu. The coordinates of the town are: 02 39 15N, 31 08 44E (Latitude:2.65417; Longitude:31.14556).Okollo also lies in the path of the 33kv electric power line from Nyagak Power Station in Paidha, Nebbi District, connecting to Arua through Nebbi, Okollo and Bando

== Overview ==
Okollo is the headquarters of Okollo sub-county in Madi-Okollo District. The town lies on the Arua-Nebbi Highway which continues on to Gulu, the largest city in Northern Uganda. Okollo also lies in the path of the 33kV electric power line from Nyagak Power Station in Paidha, Nebbi District, connecting to Arua, through Nebbi, Okollo and Bondo.Okollo is also a locality in Okollo, Arua District and has an elevation of 815 meters.Okollo is situated near to the village of Oluni and near Oyua

== Population ==
The exact population of the town of Okollo is not known at this time. According to the 2024 national population census, total population of both male and female are 15,535 people.

== See also ==
- Arua District
- Arua
- Nyagak Power Station
- Paidha
- Nebbi
- Bondo
