= West Nile Cup =

West Nile Cup is the annual football tournament contested by the political districts in the West Nile sub-region of Uganda. The tournament was started in 2012 by Lawrence Mulindwa, a year before he ceased to be the president of the Federation of Uganda Football Associations, Uganda's football-governing body. The first edition was hosted by Arua and it was organised to bring West Nile together. The other mission is to identify talent for inter-region tournaments like Airtel Under 17, which can also be a backup wellspring for the Uganda Cranes, the nickname for the national team.

== Organisation ==
It is the brainchild and legacy of Lawrence Mulindwa and is open to any West Niler from the eight political districts in West Nile. The champion district emerges after a number of selective games leading to a two-team final.

== 2014 edition ==
The 2014 invitations were given to each district and announcements delivered via Nile FM. Meanwhile, Radio Pacis Saturday Sports Show presenter Sam Anecho provided analytical reviews and hosted participants. The next tournament was scheduled to take place in Koboko.

Moyo hosted the third edition of the cup in February, and it was won by Koboko who beat Yumbe, their neighbours on the eastern side, through a penalty shootout in the finals. Koboko received UGX:1.5 million as prize money. The runners-up who won UGX:1 million had knocked out Arua in the semis. Other teams that participated included Adjumani in fourth place, who earned UGX:300,000 and the hosts Moyo. Three other teams were expected to take part but Maracha District was still under the Arua District Football Association, Nebbi District turned down the invitation again due to costs plus distance (apparently), and Zombo District was also still under Nebbi's Football Association.

== 2015 edition ==
Hosted by Koboko in the first week of February, it was won by Adjumani who edged tournament favourites Arua 4-1 on penalties after a 1-1 draw in the final on Wednesday 4 February 2015 at St. Charles Lwanga SS. The 2nd Runners-up Zombo District, who bagged 750,000 UgX, beat Yumbe 2-0 in the third place playoff. Edama Sabir with 6 goals was the Top Scorer, the Best Player was De Guzman Durman (Koboko), Best Goal Keeper was Henry Madrama (Adjumani), Fair Play went to Koboko, while the Best Referee was Atiku Rahman from Koboko. This was the first time all the eight existing political districts in West Nile took part - Koboko, Yumbe, Moyo, Adjumani, Arua, Zombo, Nebbi and newcomers Maracha. Lawrence Mulindwa, as well as Brigadier Dick Olum offered 5 Million each to sponsor the fourth edition of the tournament. The winner won 1.5 Million, Runner-up got 1 Million while fourth-placed team received 500,000 UgX.

== 2016 edition ==
After a goalless draw in the February 2016 final, Arua edged Nebbi 4-2 in the post-match penalty shootout. In the semis, Arua beat Yumbe 3-0 while Nebbi overcame Koboko by just one goal.
