= Nyapea =

Ugandan town

- Location in Uganda
- Coordinates: 02°27′31″N 30°57′21″E
- Country: Uganda
- Region: Northern Region
- Sub-Region: West Nile sub-region
- District: Zombo District
- Elevation: 4,698 ft (1,432 m)

Nyapea, is a town in Zombo District, West Nile sub-region, in the Northern Region of Uganda. The Sub county headquarters is found in Ajei. The biggest Sub county town in the region is called Akwanji.

== Location ==
Nyapea lies approximately 15 kilometres (9 mi), by road, northwest of Goli, at the international border with the Democratic Republic of the Congo, along the Goli–Paidha–Nyapea–Zombo Road.

This location is approximately 82 kilometres (51 mi), by road, south of Arua, the largest city in the West Nile sub-region. The coordinates of Nyapea are:2°27'31.0"N, 30°57'21.0"E (Latitude:2.458611; Longitude:30.955833). Nyapea sits at an average elevation of 1,432 metres (4,698 ft), above sea level.

== Points of interest ==
The following points of interest are found within the town limits or close to its edges:

- The offices of Nyapea Town Council
- Nyapea Central Market: The largest fresh-produce market in the town.
- St. Aloysius College Nyapea: An all-boys residential middle and high school (grades 8–13).
- Holy Family Hospital Nyapea (Nyapea Hospital): A charitable community hospital operated by Todd Marshall Price, MD, an American physician, belonging to International Medical Outreach, of Houston, Texas, United States.
- The town of Nyapea is the location of Nyagak III Hydroelectric Power Station, a 6.6 megawatts small hydro-power plant under construction, as of March 2019.

== See also ==
- Nyagak Hydroelectric Power Station
