= Nyagak III Hydroelectric Power Station =

Hydroelectric Power Station in Uganda

Nyagak III Power Station
- Map of Uganda showing the location of Nyagak III Power Station
- Country: Uganda
- Location: Paidha
- Coordinates: 02°25′41″N 30°58′24″E
- Purpose: Electricity generation
- Status: Operational
- Construction began: May 2019
- Opening date: August 2025
- Construction cost: US$20 million
- Owner: GenVax Nyagak
- Operator: Uganda Electricity Generation Company Limited

Dam and spillways
- Impounds: Nyagak River

Reservoir
- Normal elevation: 1,380 m (4,530 ft)

Nyagak III Hydroelectric Power Station
- Coordinates: 02°25′41″N 30°58′24″E
- Commission date: 1 August 2025
- Type: Run-of-the-river
- Turbines: 2 x 3.3 MW
- Installed capacity: 6.6 MW (8,900 hp)
- Annual generation: 36.27 GWh

Nyagak III Power Station is an operational 6.6 megawatts (8,900 hp) mini hydroelectric power project, in Uganda. The completed power station was commissioned on 1 August 2025 by Ruth Nankabirwa, the Ugandan Energy Minister.

== Location ==
The power station is located across the Nyagak River in Nyapea Sub County, Okoro County, Zombo District, in the West Nile sub-region of the Northern Region of Uganda. This is approximately 15 kilometres (9 mi) north of the town of Paidha, close to the border with the Democratic Republic of the Congo, in close proximity to, but downstream of, the existing Nyagak I Power Station.

== Overview ==
In September 2010, an Environmental Impact Assessment (EIA) was concluded by Lahmeyer International GmbH, a German consulting engineering firm. The Uganda Electricity Generation Company Limited (UEGCL) would develop Nyagak III through a Public Private Partnership (PPP). In 2013, the International Finance Corporation assisted UEGCL to identify and select an investor from the private sector, who would invest equity and arrange further debt and equity financing for the project. That investor would then design, develop, and operate the development under a PPP agreement with UEGCL. This selection process was expected to last approximately one year, beginning in July 2013. The selected private investor is a consortium consisting of Hydromax Limited and Dott Services Limited. UEGCL and the consortium then formed a special purpose vehicle, Genmax Nyagak Limited, that would build, operate, and manage the power station.

== Construction timetable ==
It was anticipated that the selection process for the core investor would last until 2014. Construction would then begin in 2015 and last three years, with commissioning anticipated in 2018. The completed dam was commissioned on 1 August 2025.

== Construction costs ==
In 2011, the construction of Nyagak III Power Station was anticipated to cost approximately US$14 million. The power generated would be evacuated via the existing 33 kilovolt transmission power lines linking the towns of Paidha, Nebbi, Bondo, Okollo, and Arua, constructed at an estimated cost of UGX:44.2 billion (€13 million) between 2013 and 2015 following the development of the Nyagak Power Station. In March 2018, the Daily Monitor reported that KfW had withdrawn a grant of Shs36 billion (€8 million), towards completion of this project, due to extended delay in reaching financial close. The Uganda government had to source new funding to bridge the gap.

As of March 2019, the construction costs are reported to be US$19.4 million. Loans were sought from (a) Trade Development Bank (TDB) (b) African Development Bank and (c) Exim Bank of China. TDB looked at the project with a view of funding it.

In November 2020, the African Export–Import Bank agreed to lend US$10 million towards the completion of this power station, replacing KfW, which withdrew €8 million funding in 2018, due to delays in land acquisition. At the time Afrexim Bank came on board, work progress was estimated at 22 percent completion. Commercial commissioning was anticipated in the fourth quarter of 2022.

== Recent developments ==
In March 2019, the Ugandan Ministry of Energy and Mineral Development, asked UEGCL to expedite the resumption of work on this power station. The new dam capacity is now increased to 6.6 megawatts (8,851 hp). The SPV company is now called GenVax Nyagak. It is jointly owned by the Ugandan government (30 percent) and a consortium (70 percent) comprising (a) Tata Consulting Engineers (b) Dott Services Limited and (c) Hydromax Limited. The table below illustrates the shareholding in GenVax Nyagak.

GenVax Nyagak Stock Ownership
Rank	Name of Owner	Country	Percentage Ownership
1	Government of Uganda	Uganda	30.0
2	Tata Consulting Engineers	India	
3	Dott Services Limited	Uganda	
4	Hydromax Limited	Uganda	
	Total		100.00

As of January 2022 construction was ongoing, with completion anticipated in the second half of 2022. After many delays, as of July 2023, the completion of the project was premised on the Uganda government availing funding of approximately UGX:28 billion (US$7.5 million) to the contractor.

== See also ==
- List of hydropower stations in Africa
- List of power stations in Uganda
- Nyapea
