= Life Concern Uganda =

- Abbreviation: LCU
- Founded: 1998
- Type: Non-governmental organization
- Legal status: NGO
- Purpose: Human rights, democracy, good governance, education, peacebuilding, conflict resolution, environmental protection, food security, and income security
- Headquarters: Phaida, Zombo District, Uganda
- Members: Open to the public and partner community-based organizations

Life Concern Uganda is a non-governmental organization in Uganda. It is a rights based non-profit organization mainly operating in the West Nile region of Uganda. Its head office is located in Phaida, Zombo district.

== Overview ==
Life Concern Uganda was established by a group of former seminarians from Nebbi /Zombo district in 1998. In 2001, it was registered as a CBO (Community Based Organization). In 2002, it was registered as a non-governmental organization, after which the membership was opened to the public, individuals and other Partner Community Based Organizations (CBOs).

== Function/overall objective ==
"Empowered, productive and self-reliant youth with employable skills in relevant fields; and effectively contributing to national growth, development and youth employment efforts."

== Target ==
Poor and marginalized people of the West Nile region such as the poor, unemployed youth, orphans, vulnerable children, vulnerable women(widows, single mothers, divorced /separated) and adolescent girls.

== Key program areas ==
- Human rights
- Democracy
- Good governance
- Education
- Peace building
- Conflict resolution and transformation
- Environment
- Food and income securities
