= Zombo, Uganda =

Ugandan town

Nebbi, Uganda Nebbi
- Location in Uganda
- Coordinates: 02°30′47″N 30°54′29″E
- Country: Uganda
- Region: Northern Region
- Sub-region: West Nile sub-region
- District: Zombo District
- Elevation: 5,026 ft (1,532 m)

Population (2020 Estimate)
  - Total: 15,000

Zombo, Uganda, often referred to simply as Zombo, is a town in Zombo District, West Nile sub-region, Northern Uganda.

== Location ==
Zombo lies approximately 40 kilometres (25 mi) west of Nebbi, the nearest large town. This location is approximately 69 kilometres (43 mi), by road, south of Arua, the largest city in the sub-region. The geographical coordinates of the town are: 02°30'47.0"N, 30°54'29.0"E (Latitude:2.513056; Longitude:30.908056). Zombo sits at an average elevation of 1,532 metres (5,026 ft), above sea level.

== Population ==
As of March 2020, the population of Zombo, Uganda was estimated at 15,000.

== Points of interest ==
The following points of interest lie within the town limits or close to the edges of town: (a) the headquarters of Zombo District Administration, (b) the offices of Zombo Town Council, (c) Zombo Central Market, the largest fresh-produce market in the town and (d) the Zombo Detach of Uganda People's Defence Force (UPDF).

== Attack on Zombo UPDF Detach ==
In the early morning of Friday, 6 March 2020, a gang of about 80 civilians, armed with machetes, spears, knives, bows and arrows, attacked the UPDF detach in Oduk Village in Zombo Municipality. Three UPDF soldiers lost their lives and their rifles (AK-47)s were stolen. A number of the attackers were also killed. In the ensuing melee, a number of grass-thatched buildings were engulfed in fire and destroyed. The surviving bandits retreated towards the nearby international border with the Democratic Republic of the Congo, with the UPDF in pursuit. Later the number of UPDF soldiers killed in the skirmishes was increased upwards to five.

== See also ==
- Goli
- Paidha
- Zombo District
- West Nile
- Northern Uganda
