= Battle of Bondo =

Part of the Uganda–Tanzania War

Coordinates: 2.783333°S 30.966667°E

- Part of the Uganda–Tanzania War
- Battle of Bondo (Uganda)
Date	27 May 1979
Location	Bondo, Uganda

Belligerents
Tanzania	Uganda

Commanders and leaders
Ahmed Kitete	Unknown

Units involved
Minziro Brigade	Kifaru Regiment

Strength
1 brigade	~50 soldiers

Casualties and losses
6 killed 14 wounded	None
- The Tanzanian casualties were inflicted by friendly fire.

The Battle of Bondo was a battle fought on 27 May 1979 near the town of Bondo, in northern Uganda, between Tanzanian forces and Ugandan troops loyal to Idi Amin, during the Uganda–Tanzania War. A band of Uganda Army soldiers opened fire on the Tanzanian Minziro Brigade as it advanced towards Arua, before fleeing in the face of a Tanzanian charge. Several Tanzanians were killed and wounded by their own artillery. It was the last battle of the war. Arua fell without resistance shortly thereafter.

== Background ==
Map of the battles of the Uganda–Tanzania War

In 1971 Idi Amin launched a military coup that overthrew the President of Uganda, Milton Obote, precipitating a deterioration of relations with the neighbouring state of Tanzania. Amin installed himself as President and ruled the country under a repressive dictatorship. In October 1978 Amin launched an invasion of Tanzania. Tanzania halted the assault, mobilised anti-Amin militant groups, and launched a counter-offensive.

In a matter of months, the Tanzania People's Defence Force (TPDF) and its Ugandan rebel allies—unified under the umbrella organisation, Uganda National Liberation Front (UNLF)—defeated the Uganda Army in a number of battles, and occupied Kampala, Uganda's capital, on 11 April 1979. With his military disintegrating, Amin's rule collapsed. Having escaped from Kampala, he travelled to a succession of cities in eastern and northern Uganda, urging his remaining forces "to go back and fight the enemy who had invaded our country", even as he prepared to flee into exile. Most Uganda Army units opted to surrender, desert or defect to the Tanzanian-led forces, but some decided to continue to fight for Amin's defunct regime. Amin fled to Arua, where he was picked up by a Libyan military plane and flown to Tripoli into exile. The Tanzanians and the UNLF allies continued their advance to secure eastern and northern Uganda.

Following the occupation of Kitgum by the TPDF, the West Nile District remained the only region in Uganda under pro-Amin control. The two brigade-strong "Task Force" was ordered to secure it. Aside from some small-arms fire at the Ora River, the Tanzanians faced no resistance as they occupied the district. Morale was high, and the Tanzanian troops wished to quickly secure Arua, the last major town under pro-Amin control, where it was widely rumoured Amin was staying.

== Prelude ==
Major General Silas Mayunga, commander of the Task Force, ordered Brigadier Ahmed Kitete's Minziro Brigade to secure the road to Arua. The brigade's soldiers pressed their officers for a quick advance, as they were eager to finish the war. The Tanzanians felt that the only potential obstacle along the road was the Uganda Army base near Bondo. Positioned 20 kilometres south of Arua, Bondo Camp was one of the largest military installations in the country, serving as the home base for the Kifaru Mechanised Specialist Reconnaissance Regiment. On 27 May 1979 Kitete ordered his brigade to halt five kilometres away from Bondo Camp and rest until the next day, but his battalion commanders urged him to proceed with an attack on the base. Kitete assented, and instructed lunch to be prepared before the operation. The Tanzanian officers quickly drew up plans for the attack while they ate. Since they believed Bondo Camp was probably abandoned, they did not prepare for the employment of their artillery.

== Battle ==
The Tanzanians advanced in a column towards Bondo Camp in the late afternoon, led by a battalion and three tanks. When they were in the barracks' vicinity, the tanks opened fire on the sides of the roads with their machine guns to clear out any Ugandan troops. Shortly thereafter Ugandan soldiers positioned in front of the Tanzanians fired a 106 mm recoilless rifle. The shot went over the column and landed three kilometres down the road, near Kitete's command post. A second shell landed in the same area, followed by numerous Katyusha rockets which landed to the Tanzanians' rear.

The Tanzanian tanks responded with heavy cannon and machine-gun fire, while the infantry sprayed the bush with submachine guns. Kitete could not get a view of the fighting as darkness fell and, considering that artillery had landed near his post and hearing heavy firing, believed that his men had been ambushed. Unable to reach his frontline commanders via radio, he ordered his artillery to bombard the hills immediately behind Bondo Camp. Meanwhile, Tanzanian soldiers at the front of the column charged forward. They secured the abandoned recoilless rifle and Katyusha rocket launcher and spotted about 50 Ugandan soldiers retreating down the Arua road. The Tanzanians pursued them up into the hills when their own artillery began to strike. The first shell dismembered two Tanzanian soldiers, killing them. The pursuit quickly ended as Tanzanian soldiers dived to the ground to take cover. They were unable to reach their artillery battery via radio, and the bombardment continued. Journalists Tony Avirgan and Martha Honey were accompanying the TPDF during the battle and were also forced to take cover.

Eventually having been notified that his artillery was striking his own troops, Kitete dispatched his chauffeur to the battery to instruct it to cease firing. The battle lasted approximately 90 minutes. Six Tanzanians were killed and 14 critically wounded (Note: Journalist Baldwin Mzirai wrote that 16 Tanzanians were injured.) by their own artillery. Ambulances arrived at dark to collect them. There were no Ugandan casualties.

== Aftermath ==
The clash at Bondo was the only resistance the TPDF faced as it advanced on Arua, and was the last battle of the Uganda–Tanzania War. On 28 May the TPDF's Task Force reached the outskirts of Arua. Intelligence reports indicated that Uganda Army troops maintained a large presence in the town, but a civilian informed the Tanzanians that all pro-Amin soldiers had fled. The Task Force's 206th Brigade conducted a light bombardment of the surrounding area and launched star shells into the town. Arua was subsequently seized without resistance. Several high-ranking Uganda Army officers and officials in Amin's government who surrendered in Arua told the Tanzanians that after the fall of Kampala thousands of Ugandan soldiers had fled to Sudan and Zaire with the stated goal of launching an insurgency and retaking Uganda. From Arua the Minziro Brigade advanced to Uganda's western border with Sudan and Zaire. It secured the frontier on 3 June 1979, thus ending the war.

Remnants of the Uganda Army subsequently reorganised in the northwestern border regions and launched a rebellion against the new Ugandan government in 1980. Government officials reported that by October both Arua and Bondo Camp had been seized by the rebel troops. Tanzanian troops assisted in the recapture of the camp. When the last Tanzanian troops left Uganda in October 1981, the rebels made larger incursions into the West Nile District. Subsequent fighting caused significant damage to the area, and the Ugandan government was not able to contain the insurgency until 1982.
