= Nebbi General Hospital =

- Uganda Ministry of Health

Geography
- Location: Nebbi, Nebbi District, Northern Region, Uganda
- Coordinates: 02°28′39″N 31°05′08″E

Organisation
- Care system: Public
- Type: General

Services
- Emergency department: I
- Beds: 108

History
- Founded: 1969

Links
- Other links: Hospitals in Uganda

Nebbi General Hospital, also Nebbi Hospital, is a hospital in the Northern Region of Uganda.

== Location ==
The hospital is located in the central business district of the town of Nebbi, in Nebbi District, in the West Nile sub-region, in Northern Uganda, about 78 kilometres (48 mi) southeast of Arua Regional Referral Hospital.

This is approximately 173 kilometres (107 mi) southwest of Gulu Regional Referral Hospital. The coordinates of the hospital are:02°28'39.0"N, 31°05'08.0"E (Latitude:2.477495; Longitude:31.085549).

== Overview ==
Nebbi Hospital was established in 1969 by the first government of Prime Minister Milton Obote. It has a bed capacity of 108. As with many government hospitals built at the same time, the hospital infrastructure was in dilapidated state, with antiquated equipment.

== Recent developments ==
In 2013, the government of Uganda solicited bids for the renovation of certain hospitals, including Nebbi General Hospital, using funds borrowed from the World Bank. The work was contracted to China Railway Number 5 Engineering Group, at a contract cost of US$3.8 million. Work started in February 2014 with an initial completion date of June 2015. Due to multiple delays, the work was completed in May 2016. The work included the following components: 1. Construct a new, larger outpatient department 2. Construct a new larger casualty department (emergency room) 3. Construct a building to house the diesel generator for electricity 4. Build a placenta disposal facility 5. Build a disposal facility for bio-medical waste 6. Build a laundry facility for patient's family members 7. Build a kitchen and dining room or the patients' family members 8. Build ventilated improved pit latrines for patient's families and outpatients 9. Refurbish the T-Block building and 10. Refurbish two existing staff houses.

== See also ==
- List of hospitals in Uganda
