= Bondo =

Bondo may refer to:

== People ==
- Marcelle Bouele Bondo (born 1993), Congolese sprinter
- Pedro Bondo (born 2004), Angolan footballer
- Terry Bondo (born 2007), English footballer
- Warren Bondo (born 2003), French footballer
- Jeremy Bonderman (born 1982), American baseball pitcher nicknamed "Bondo"
- Bondo people, an ethnic group in Orissa, India

== Places ==
- Bondo, Angola, a former commune
- Bondo Territory, Democratic Republic of the Congo
  - Bondo, Democratic Republic of the Congo, a town, capital of the territory
- Roman Catholic Diocese of Bondo, Bondo, Democratic Republic of the Congo
- Bondo, Trentino, Italy, a frazione
- Bondo, Ivory Coast, a town
- Bondo District, Kenya
  - Bondo, Kenya, a town in Bondo District
  - Bondo Constituency, one of two constituencies in Bondo District
- Anglican Diocese of Bondo, Bondo, Kenya
- Bondo, Mali, a village and commune
- Bondo, original name of San Francisco, Quezon, Philippines, a municipality
- Bondo, Switzerland, a village and former municipality in the canton of Grisons/Graubunden/Grigioni
- Bondo, Uganda, a town

== Other uses ==
- Cyclone Bondo, a tropical cyclone impacting Madagascar in December 2006
- Battle of Bondo, a May 1979 battle between Tanzanian forces and Ugandan troops loyal to Idi Amin, during the Uganda–Tanzania War
- Bondo language, the Austroasiatic language spoken by the Bondo people
- Bondo (putty), two-part putty used in automotive, household, and marine applications, created by Bondo Corporation
- Sande society (also Bondo), a women's association found in parts of West Africa, especially Sierra Leone
- "Bondo", an episode of The Wrong Door, a BBC Three comedy sketch show
