= Arua Regional Referral Hospital =

- Uganda Ministry of Health

Geography
- Location: Arua, Arua District, Uganda
- Coordinates: 03°01′10″N 30°54′45″E

Organisation
- Care system: Public
- Type: General and Teaching

Services
- Emergency department: I
- Beds: 272

Links
- Other links: Hospitals in Uganda; Medical education in Uganda

Arua Regional Referral Hospital, commonly known as Arua Hospital is a hospital in the town of Arua, in Northern Uganda. It is the referral hospital for the districts of Adjumani, Arua, Koboko, Maracha, Moyo, Nebbi, Yumbe, and Zombo. The hospital also receives referrals from neighboring parts of South Sudan and the Democratic Republic of the Congo.

== Location ==
Arua Regional Referral Hospital is located in the city of Arua, Arua District, West Nile sub-region, in the Northern Region of Uganda. It is located approximately 251 kilometres (156 mi), by road, northwest of Gulu Regional Referral Hospital. This location is approximately 496 kilometres (308 mi), by road, northwest of Mulago National Referral Hospital, in Kampala, Uganda's capital and largest city. The coordinates of Arua Regional Referral Hospital are: 03°01'10.0"N, 30°54'45.0"E (Latitude:3.019444; Longitude:30.912500).

== Overview ==
Arua Hospital is a public hospital, funded by the Uganda Ministry of Health and general care in the hospital is free. It is one of the thirteen (13) Regional Referral Hospitals in Uganda. The hospital is designated as one of the fifteen (15) Internship Hospitals in Uganda where graduates of Ugandan medical schools can serve one year of internship under the supervision of qualified specialists and consultants. The bed capacity of Arua Hospital is quoted as 272, although the hospital admits far more patients, with the excess either sleeping on the floor, or sharing beds.

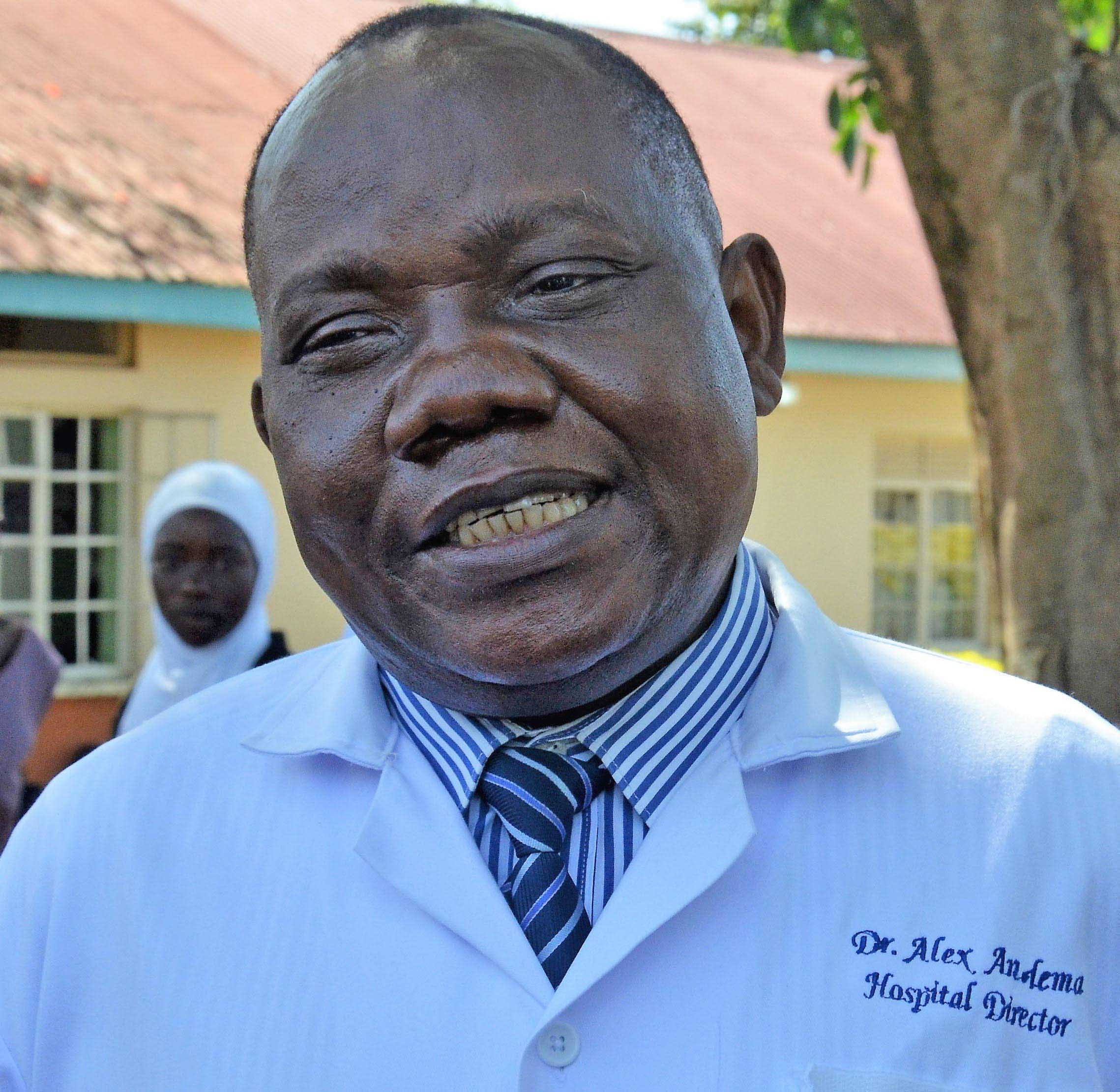
Dr. Alex Andema ( Arua Regional Referral Hospital).jpg

== See also ==
- Hospitals in Uganda
