= Arua City Tower =

Arua City Tower is a Ugandan cultural monument in the middle of the Arua Hill Roundabout. It is a symbol of unity representing the various tribes in West Nile sub-region including Lugbara people, Aringa, Madi, Alur, Kakwa, Asians, Congolese, Sudanese and others.

== History ==
Views of the Arua City Tower (Monument)

Construction of the monument started during June 2020 by Development Infrastructure (DI), under a Public Private Partnership (PPP) signed in 2019 with Arua Municipal Council (before it became Arua City Council by 1 July 2020).

On 10 August 2024, MTN Uganda held a consultative meeting in Arua City, announcing that they had signed an agreement with DI and paid UGX 60 million to expedite the completion of the 49.5-meter-high tower. Arua City Council rejected it pending audit. Nevertheless, on 14 October 2024, a motion was presented to approve a 10 year partnership. By their 27th birthday in Uganda on Tuesday 21 October 2025, MTN commissioned the tower amid celebrations at the nearby OPM Ground (in Arua City).

== Features ==
Located in the north immediately next to Arua Hill Park, ACT has an observation deck at the rooftop that offers panoramic views of Arua City, DR Congo and the rest of West Nile. There is also a restaurant, small two-floor museum showcasing West Nile's rich heritage, artefacts and traditions plus a wall of fame honouring regional leaders.

A craftshop at the base promotes local artisans while the digital advertising screens reduce billboard clutter and enhance the city's appearance. The leopard sculpture facing south represents West Nile's resilience, courage and unity.

== Reception ==
After commissioning, the Arua City Tower sparked outrage on social media, especially X (formerly Twitter) because of its design and yellow colour. Joel Aita, the executive director of Development Infrastructure and the project lead, retorted that the tower's goal is to “celebrate culture, drive tourism, create jobs and make Arua City a vibrant hub of growth and identity.”

== See also ==
- African Renaissance Monument
- Arua Hill Park
- Independence Monument (Uganda)
