= James Nyakuni =

Ugandan businessman and entrepreneur

- Occupations: Businessman and entrepreneur
- Years active: 1990 — present
- Title: Managing director (Gaagaa Bus Services Limited)

James Nyakuni is a Ugandan businessman and entrepreneur who is the founder, owner, and managing director of Gaagaa Bus Services Limited. He was reported in 2007 to be one of the wealthiest Ugandans.

== Businesses and investments ==
His business interests include the Coca-Cola distribution franchise for the West Nile sub-region, Gaagaa Bus Services Limited, whose vehicles offer round-the clock transportation between Arua and Kampala, apartment complexes and other rental real estate in Arua and Kampala, and a fleet of long-haul trucks.
