= Nile University of Uganda =

In Arua, Uganda

Coordinates: 03°04′11″N 30°56′15″E

Nile University (NUU)
- Type: Private
- Established: August 27, 2003; 22 years ago
- Vice-Chancellor: Prof. Simeon Wanyama
- Location: Arua, Uganda
- Campus: Rural
- Website: Homepage

Nile University (NUU) is a privately owned institution of higher education in Uganda. It is accredited and licensed by the Uganda National Council for Higher Education (UNCHE).

== Location ==
The main campus of the university is located on temporary premises, at Ombaci Village, Manibe sub-county, in Arua District, approximately 8 kilometres (5 mi), north-east of the central business district of the city of Arua, along the Arua–Moyo Road. The geographical location of the temporary campus of Nile University are: 03°04'11.0"N, 30°56'15.0"E (Latitude:3.069722; Longitude:30.937500).

The university owns 206 hectares (509 acres) of land, in Uriama sub-county, in Maracha District, near the village of Biliefe, approximately 25 kilometres (16 mi), north-east of Arua, on the Arua–Rhino Camp Road. This where the university plans to relocate the main campus in the future.

== History ==
Nile University opened its doors to its first cohort of 53 students on 24 August 2003. All freshmen undergraduates are required to take a foundation year of English, Mathematics, Computer Studies and Ethics. The university was established to meet the huge need for higher education, research and human development in the West Nile sub-region.

== Academics ==
The university is organised into three faculties; (a) Faculty of Agriculture (b) Faculty of Business Administration and Management and (c) Faculty of Education.

=== Courses ===
As of May 2018, the following academic courses are offered at Nile University in Uganda:

Postgraduate courses

- Master's Degree in Health Services Management
- Postgraduate Diploma in Health Services Management

Undergraduate degree courses

- Bachelor of Business Administration and Management
- Bachelor of Ethics and Development Studies
- Bachelor of Agricultural Economics and Agribusiness Management
- Bachelor of Agricultural Entrepreneurship
- Bachelor of Primary Education

Undergraduate diploma courses

The following undergraduate diploma courses are offered at the university

- Diploma in Human Resource Management
- Diploma in Business Administration and Management
- Diploma in Health Service Management
- Diploma in Project Planning and Management
- Diploma in Public Administration and Management.

== See also ==
- List of Business Schools in Uganda
- List of universities in Uganda
- Education in Uganda
