= Dott Services =

Company in Uganda

Coordinates: 00°20′41″N 32°36′07″E

Dott Services Limited
- Company type: Private
- Industry: Construction
- Founded: 1994; 32 years ago
- Headquarters: 30 Bukoto Crescent Road, Naguru Hill, Kampala, Uganda
- Key people: Venugopal Rao; Executive Director; Maheswara Reddy; Managing Director; Jamesone Olonya; Contracts Manager
- Services: Commercial construction
- Number of employees: 500 - 1,000
- Website: Homepage

Dott Services Limited, commonly referred to as Dott Services, is a Ugandan engineering and construction company. As of December 2021, it is one of the leading companies in the engineering and construction fields, in the African Great Lakes Region. Headquartered in Kampala, Uganda's capital city, Dott Services is active in Uganda, Tanzania, South Sudan and DR Congo,

== Overview ==
Dott Services was established in 1994 by four engineers who graduated from the same engineering college in India: (a) Venugopal Rao (Executive Director, Dott Services) (b) Maheswara Reddy, (Managing Director, Dott Services) (c) Prasad Reddy and (d) Komi Reddy. Each of the founders/directors own 25 percent of the company stock. As of 2021 the company employed an estimated work force of between 500 and 1,000 people.

== Ownership ==
The business is privately owned by the families of the four original founders. The table below illustrates the shareholding in the company stock.

Shareholding In Dott Services Limited
| Rank | Shareholder | Percentage Ownership |
|---|---|---|
| 1 | Venugopal Rao | 25.0 |
| 2 | Maheswara Reddy | 25.0 |
| 3 | Prasad Reddy | 25.0 |
| 4 | Ram Mohan | 25.0 |

== Governance ==
The executive chairman of the company is Venugopal Rao, an Indian national. Maheswara Reddy, another Indian national, is the managing director. The contracts manager at the company is Engineer Jamesone Olonya, a Ugandan national.

== Projects ==
This is a partial listing of past and current construction projects, where Dott Services Limited is or was the lead contractor:

1. Iganga–Tirinyi–Kamonkoli–Mbale Road: The tarmacking of this 64 miles (103 km) road to class II bitumen standard, with shoulders, culverts and drainage channels, was ongoing as of July 2020.

2. The Ishaka–Kagamba Road: This 35.6 kilometres (22 mi) road was converted to bitumen surface in 2016.

3. Jinja-Kamuli Road: The road was resurfaced in 2007, in preparation for the 2007 Commonwealth Heads of Government Meeting in Kampala, Uganda and as of 2021, is under preparation for resurfacing.

4. Kampala–Mityana Road: The 30 kilometres (19 mi), Muduuma–Mityana section of the Kampala–Mityana Road, was converted to class 2 bitumen standard, by Dott Services Limited, between 2008 and 2012.

5. The Hoima-Kiziranfumbi-Kabaale Road, and Kafu-Masindi Road are both contracted to Dott Services Limited, as part of Uganda's Oil Roads.

6. Dott Services is contracted to build/repair/improve several roads in Tanzania, including (a) Korogwe–Mkumbarangu–Kilacha–Rombo Road.

7. Nyagak III Hydroelectric Power Station, the 6.6 MW hydropower station in Zombo District, Uganda was built between 2015 and 2025 at a cost of about US$20 million.

== Recent developments ==
In 2021, Dott Services Limited was selected to construct a number of roads inside the Democratic Republic of the Congo, linking that country to Uganda, to the east. The roads, totaling 223 kilometres (139 mi), in length, include the Kasindi–Beni–Butembo Road and the Bunagana–Rutshuru–Goma Road.

== See also ==
- Economy of Uganda
- ROKO Construction Company
