= Industrial Promotion Services =

- Type: Private
- Industry: Industrial development
- Founded: 1963
- Headquarters: Nairobi, Kenya
- Key people: Lutaf Kassam, Chairman, Mbuvi Ngunze CEO
- Products: Manufacturing, printing, publishing, agribusiness, energy

Industrial Promotion Services (IPS) is the industrial development arm of the Aga Khan Fund for Economic Development (AKFED). AKFED is a member of the Aga Khan Development Network.

== Location ==
IPS is headquartered in Nairobi, Kenya, and has subsidiaries in Tanzania and Uganda.

== Development projects ==
The development projects that IPS is involved in include:

- An equity participation in the 74MW Kipevu II Power Plant in Kenya
- An equity participation in the 288MW Azito Power Plant in Ivory Coast
- An equity participation in the 250MW Bujagali Power Plant in Uganda. Other partners in this project include Sithe Global Power LLC, an American power development company. Sithe Global Power LLC, is owned by the Blackstone Group and Reservoir Capital Group.
- Through its Special Purpose Vehicle subsidiary West Nile Rural Electrification Company, an equity participation in the 3.5MW Nyagak I Power Station in West Nile sub-region, in Northern Uganda

== Ownership ==
The shareholders in IPS are summarized in the table below:

Industrial Promotion Services stock ownership
Rank	Name of owner	Percentage ownership
1	Aga Khan Fund for Economic Development	51.0
3	German Investment Corporation (DEG)	14.5
4	Others	19.5

- DEG stands for German Investment Corporation, the investment arm of the Federal Republic of Germany

== See also ==
- Aga Khan Fund for Economic Development
- DEG
- KfW
