= Rama Jacqueline Aol =

Ugandan politician

- Other names: Aol Rama
- Citizenship: Ugandan
- Education: Bachelor of Development Studies, Ndejje University
- Occupations: Politician, Social Worker

Rama Jacqueline Aol (née Aol Jacqueline), also Aol Rama, (born 26 January 1969) is a female Ugandan politician and a social worker. She is the district woman representative of Nebbi District in the 10th Ugandan Parliament (2016 to 2021). Aol belongs to the ruling National Resistance Movement (NRM) political party.

== Background and education ==
Aol is married. Below is her educational background:

Aol obtained her Uganda certificate of Education (UCE) in 1985 from Sacred Heart Gulu. She also has a certificate in counseling and guidance from Nsamizi training institute for social development obtained in 2004 and later a certificate in addiction studies from Uganda Martyrs University Nkozi in 2007. In 2014, she sat her Uganda Advanced Certificate of Education from Arua Hall.

Year attained	Qualification	Type	Institution
1985	UCE	Uganda Certificate Of Education	Sacred Heart Gulu
2004	Counselling and Guidance Certificate	Certificate	Nsamizi
2006	Diploma	Diploma	Nsamizi
2007	Addiction Studies Certificate	Certificate	Nkozi University
2014	UACE	Uganda Advanced Certificate of Education	Arua Hall (UNEB)
2014	Certificate in Monitoring and Evaluation	Certificate	Ndejje University
2014	Certificate in Oil and Gas Reporting	Certificate	Africa Centre for Media Excellence
2014	Certificate in Radio Production	Certificate	BBC World Service
2014	Certificate in Peace and Conflict Sensitive Reporting	Certificate	Internews Network
2014	Certificate in Farm Talk Production	Certificate	Farm Radio International
2014	Certificate in Online Journalism	Certificate	Learn BBC World Service Trust
2014	Certificate in Computer Applications	Certificate	Ndejje University
2017	Bachelor of Development Studies (ongoing)	Bachelor's degree	Ndejje University

== Career before politics ==
In 2005, she worked as a counselor at Serenity Centre. Later in the same year, she joined Community Action Against Alcoholism and Drug Abuse as a director to date. Between 2006 and 2013, she served as board member at the Arua Technical Institute, Ragem. Between 2010 and 2014, Aol worked as the chairperson at the West Nile Consortium on Elimination of Gender Based Violence. From 2007 to 2015, she worked as a journalist at the Arua Diocese Media Centre-Radio Pacis. From 1991 to 2001, she served as the Clerical Officer at Nebbi District Local Government and also worked as the Clerical Officer at the Judiciary Department between 1986 and 1991.

== Political career ==
Before joining the Parliament of Uganda as the Member of Parliament for the Nebbi District in 2016, Aol served as the speaker of Oluk Sub-County, Arua District from 2011 to 2014.

Aol serves on additional role at the Parliament of Uganda as the Committee on Equal Opportunities and Agriculture. She also serves under the full membership of professional bodies of the Uganda Journalists Union.

She has expressed concern about girls dropping out of education early in Nebbi as a result of marrying young.

== Career after leaving parliament ==
In 2019, she set up the West Nile Women Development Agency (WEWODA).

== See also ==
- Parliament of Uganda
- List of members of the tenth Parliament of Uganda
- Nebbi District
