= Richard Matovu =

Ugandan football player

Personal information
- Full name: Richard Matovu
- Date of birth: 5 February 1999 (age 27)
- Position: Left-back

Team information
- Current team: Vipers SC

Richard Matovu is a Ugandan Professional footballer who plays as a left-back defender for Uganda Premier League club Vipers SC. He signed from Arua Hill SC in 2023 on a two year contract.

== Personal life ==
Matovu was born on 5 February 1999.

== Football career ==
Matovu had 47 Uganda Premier League caps across two seasons with Arua Hill SC before joining Vipers in 2023.

In 2018, Richard was selected for the 34 man squad of the Uganda Kobs that played South Sudan for the AFCON 2019 under 23 qualifiers.

Matovu has also played for clubs like Kyetume FC and BUL Football Club.
