= Nile University (disambiguation) =

Nile University may refer to any of the following:

- Nile University, in Sheikh Zayed City, Egypt
- Nigerian Turkish Nile University, in Abuja, Nigeria
- Nile University of Uganda, in Arua, Uganda
- Upper Nile University, in Malakal, South Sudan
