= Goli, Uganda =

Goli
- Map of Uganda showing the location of Goli.
- Coordinates: 02°23′14″N 31°01′35″E
- Country: Uganda
- Regions of Uganda: Northern Region
- Sub-region: West Nile sub-region
- Districts of Uganda: Nebbi District
- Elevation: 1,400 m (4,600 ft)
- Time zone: UTC+3 (EAT)

Goli is a town in the Northern Region of Uganda.

== History ==
On 13 February 1965, Goli and Paidha were bombed by the Congolese Air Force in retaliation for the support of the Ugandan government for Simba rebels. The attack caused minimal damage.

== Location ==
Goli is located in Nebbi District, West Nile sub-region, The town is at the international border with the Democratic Republic of the Congo. It is approximately 95 kilometres (59 mi), by road, south-east of Arua, the largest town in the sub-region. This location is approximately 440 kilometres (270 mi), by road, north-west of Kampala, the capital and largest city of Uganda. The district headquarters, at Nebbi are located about 15 kilometres (9 mi), by road, north-east of Goli. The coordinates of the town are: 2°23'14.0"N, 31°01'35.0"E (Latitude:2.387222; Longitude:31.026389).

== Overview ==
The small town of Goli, Uganda is located on the main road between Arua on the Ugandan side and Bunia, the capital of Ituri Province in the DRC. In 2009, Goli was one of the locations of disagreements between Uganda and the DRC over their international border. The two countries selected a review commission to study the problem and report to the two governments.

== Landmarks ==
The landmarks within the town limits or close to the edges of town include:

- The offices of Goli Town Council
- World Concern Medical Center - A rural health facility run by a missionary nurse
- Goli Central Market
- St. Stephen's Cathedral of the Church of Uganda, Nebbi Diocese

== Photos ==
- Photos Taken Around Goli, Uganda in 2003
