= Nyagak Hydroelectric Power Station =

Nyagak Power Station
- Map of Uganda showing the location of Nyagak Power Station
- Country: Uganda
- Location: Paidha
- Coordinates: 02°25′50″N 30°57′50″E
- Status: Operational

Dam and spillways
- Impounds: Nyagak River

Reservoir
- Normal elevation: 1,380 m (4,530 ft)

Power Station
- Commission date: September 2012
- Type: Run-of-the-river
- Turbines: 2
- Installed capacity: 3.5 MW (4,700 hp)

Nyagak Power Station is a 3.5 megawatts (4,700 hp) mini hydroelectric power plant in Uganda.

== Location ==
The power station is located across the Nyagak River, in Nyapea Sub-county, Okoro County, Zombo District, in West Nile sub-region, Northern Region. This location is in the town of Paidha, close to the border with the Democratic Republic of the Congo. This location is approximately 97 kilometres (60 mi), by road, south of Arua, the largest town in the sub-region. The coordinates of the power station are 2°25'50.0"N 30°57'50.0"E (Latitude: 2.430556; Longitude: 30.963889).

== Overview ==
The site and the development concept for the project have been extensively studied, including:

- an environmental impact analysis (EIA) by Gissat Technical Consultants Limited in 1997
- a detailed feasibility study and EIA by Harza Engineering in 1998
- an EIA by NORPLAN in 2001
- an Environmental Impact Statement by Environmental Management Associates and the ECON Center for Economic Analysis in 2005.

The Nyagak hydropower project, in its first phase, is expected to generate 3.5 megawatts, using a run-of-river scheme. A diversion weir 14 metres (46 ft) high will be constructed about 600 metres (2,000 ft) downstream from the Paidha-Nyapea Road Bridge. A power intake will be located at the left abutment of the weir. The water conveyance works are composed of a 1-kilometre (0.62 mi) long pipeline, a surge shaft, and a 400-metre (1,300 ft) long surface penstock. The powerhouse will be configured to accommodate two 1.65 megawatts (2,210 hp) generating units along with the associated electro-mechanical equipment. The sub-region is not connected to the national electric grid and is not expected to be connected to the grid until the planned 600 megawatts (800,000 hp) Karuma Power Station comes online in 2018.

It is anticipated that power produced from Nyagak will serve a population exceeding one million people in Arua District, Nebbi District, and Zombo District. A 33 kilovolt powerline connecting the towns of Arua and Nebbi is being developed. A 33 kilovolt powerline already exists between the towns of Nebbi and Paidha and is just a short distance away from the proposed powerhouse. The structural design allows for future expansion of the generation capacity to 7 megawatts (9,400 hp) of power.

All the studies carried out before construction of the powerhouse indicated that potentially low environmental and social impacts would result from the implementation of the Nyagak Hydropower Project. The main reason for this is that the hydro scheme is small and its impact is limited. The area is sparsely populated with low aquatic and terrestrial ecological characteristics.

The Nyagak Hydropower project is in line with the Ugandan government’s plans for the decentralization and privatization of hydropower systems. The government of Uganda, through support from the World Bank, is in the process of implementing the Energy for Rural Transformation (ERT) through the African Rural Renewable Energy Initiative (AFRREI). West Nile Rural Electrification Company (WENRECO), a subsidiary of Industrial Promotion Services, was selected to develop the power plant. Construction began in December 2006.

== Construction delays ==
The project was delayed for nearly two decades because of financial and procurement hurdles at the government level.

President Yoweri Museveni broke ground in February 2006. In December 2006, the Czech construction firm Skodaexport Company Limited started construction. Since 2006, about ten deadlines were issued for completion of the dam.

After multiple interruptions, construction of the power station resumed in August 2010. Spencon Services of India was selected as the new contractor. Under the revised terms of the contract, the government of Uganda took a 10 percent shareholding in the power station.

By July 2012, the construction of the power station was complete. On 14 September 2012, President Yoweri Museveni commissioned the power plant.

== Construction costs ==
The estimated costs for the dam and power plant were approximately US$14 million.

The German Investment Corporation, a subsidiary of KfW, has provided US$11 million for construction of the power station, as well as US$13 million for the West Nile Electric Grid Extension and Rehabilitation Project.

== See also ==
- List of power stations in Uganda
- List of hydropower stations in Africa
- List of hydroelectric power stations
