= Arua Hill Park =

Sports and business complex in Arua, Uganda

Arua Hill Park is a multi-purpose sports and business complex located next to the Arua City Monument at the roundabout on Pakwach Road in Arua, Uganda. It will be a venue for football, basketball, tennis, volleyball, badminton, etc. The Arua Hill Park will also have a doctors plaza and 4-star hotel with 60 beds plus a swimming pool.

== History ==
Also referred to as the 'Arua Hill Stadium and Business Park' or ASBP, construction started in June 2019 and the stadium that will have artificial turf is expected to be ready for use in July 2021. By September 2020, construction was at '60 percent', according to Joel Jaffer Aita - the Project Manager and CEO of Joadah Consult. The 20,000 capacity stadium is a Public Private Partnership (PPP) between Arua City Council who leased the land for 49 years and Development Infrastructure who provided funding.

According to Aita, the 24/7 business facilities that make up the outer walls of the 'live stadium' will ensure that the arena is 'maintained and operational' unlike the others they case-studied before embarking on this one. This will help recover construction costs.

== Future ==
It will become the home of Arua Hill Sports Club who currently play in the Ugandan Big League but plan to gain promotion to the top flight Uganda Premier League in at least two years time.

== Challenges during construction ==
Heavy rain in June and July 2019 plus the COVID-19 lockdown since March 2020 slowed down construction by three months. Consequently, day and night shifts were scheduled.

== Transport and access ==
The Arua Hill Park is served by boda-boda, tuktuk, bus and special hire routes on Weatherhead Park Lane, Independence (Uhuru) Avenue from Barifa area, Arua Avenue and Pakwach Road.

It will have apartments, retail shops, clinic, bank, supermarket and the Arua Hill Hotel.
