= Arua Hill S.C. =

Association football club in Uganda

Arua Hill SC
- Arua Hill Sports Club Logo
- Full name: Arua Hill Sports Club
- Founded: 10 February 2010
- Ground: Arua Hill Stadium (Under Construction)
- Capacity: 20,000
- Manager: Charles Livingston Mbabazi
- Website: aruahillsc.com

Arua Hill Sports Club is a Ugandan football club based in Arua. Previously branded as (Aziz Damani) Doves All Stars FC, Arua Hill SC got promoted to the 2022 Ugandan Premier League after topping their Elgon Group in the 2021 FUFA Big League. It was the club's sixth attempt to reach top flight football. Having bought 100 percent shares in Doves, Joel Aita became the new owner of the club during 2020 but was replaced as Chairman by Hassan Mugerwa Takoowa as their 2024 season ended halfway. Brendah Nyamwiza became CEO after Pius Bamwange.

== 2021-2022 season ==
Many new players were brought in for the new season and Arua Hill's invincible Big League Coach Hussein Mbalangu was replaced by Charles Livingstone Mbabazi who already had experience in coaching an Arua side in the UPL. With a 2–0 away win over defending champions Express, Arua Hill SC started their debut in the Ugandan Premier League successfully. Robert Eseru (62nd minute) and substitute Rashid Kawawa four minutes from fulltime ensured that the Leopards returned to Barifa in high spirits. They did not face record champions SC Villa on Saturday 23 October 2021 but drew 0–0 with Onduparaka the following Tuesday in the first ever Arua City Derby of the UPL. A Leku consolation goal was not enough as Arua Hill suffered its first 2–1 loss of the season at Mbarara City on Friday 29 October 2021. Four days later, Arua Hill came from two goals down to beat URA FC 3–2 and climb to 4th on the table. Samuel Ssekamate scored twice including a freekick before halftime and penalty equaliser in second half while Leku netted the winner before being redcarded. On Friday 19 November 2021, a freekick goal deflected into the net by Rashid Toha knocked Arua Hill down (the second time in the season) with a 1–0 loss at Gaddafi in Jinja. It was followed by another similar loss to KCCA at Barifa on Friday 26 November 2021. Four days later, a 62nd-minute winner from Leku clinched three points against Busoga United in Jinja-Njeru. Goals from Leku in the 2nd minute, Ssekamate in 54th and Media in 90th +3 gave the Leopards a comfortable 3–1 win on Sunday 5 December 2021 in Barifa; Tooro United got its consolation in the 13th minute of additional time though 8 minutes had been added. After a 0–0 stalemate at Bright Stars and a comeback 2–2 draw with visitors SC Villa, Arua Hill beat UPDF 2–1 at Barifa on Saturday 18 December 2021 to leapfrog them into 6th position. Four days later, they beat 4th-placed Wakiso Giants 2–1 away. Arua Hill suffered their worst defeat of the season at 3rd-placed BUL FC on Tuesday 28 December 2021 by conceding four goals without reply. On Tuesday 4 January 2022, a 10th-minute header by Leku clinched three points at home against Vipers. Arua Hill ended the first round of their campaign with a goalless draw at Police FC and in 5th place. They kicked off the 2nd round of matches with a 2–0 win over visitors Police on Saturday 6 February 2022.

== 2020-2021 season ==
Arua Hill SC kicked off the 2021 FUFA Big League season with a 3–1 victory over Blacks Power at Barifa Playground on 25 March 2021 with goals from Paddy Muhumuza, Caesar Okhuti and Emmanuel Mutebi. It was followed two days later by a 3–0 home win over Mbale Kataka with goals from skipper Caesar Okhuti, Allan Mugalu and Alfred Leku and a goalless draw at Maroons. In the 47th Stanbic Uganda Cup Round of 32 First Leg at Barifa on 7 April 2021, goals from Rashid Kawawa, Mike Kawooya and Alfred Leku gave AHSC a 3–2 win over UPDF. The visitors got two valuable away goals from Joseph Vuni and Alex Kitata that helped them knock out Arua Hill 1–0 in the return leg at Bombo Military Ground on Sunday 11 April, the first loss of the season for the Arua club. On Thursday 15 April, Caesar Okhuti ended his away-goal drought as Arua Hill drew 1–1 with Mbale Heroes at the Mbale Municipal Stadium. On Sunday 18 April 2021, Arua Hill beat visitors Calvary FC 1–0 with Allan Mugalu's lone strike to remain top of the Elgon group. At Barifa on Thursday 22 April, substitute Bithum scored a 90th minute 2-2 equaliser for Gaddafi FC. Okhuti had put Arua Hill ahead in the 2nd minute but Bamukyaye equalised in the 25th minute. Then Leku gave Arua the lead again in the 71st minute before the points were shared. On Sunday 25 April 2021 at Paidha Black Angels (Bar Okoro Stadium), substitute Rashid Kawawa came on to score twice for Arua Hill to keep them top of the group after the first round of matches. Arua Hill kicked off their 2nd Round of matches with a 1–1 draw at Blacks Power in Mbale. A few days later while still in Mbale, they surrendered a two-goal lead to draw 2–2 with Kataka. Two first half headers by Kawooya (11th minute) and Mugalu (31st minute) without reply were enough for the Leopards to beat Maroons on 23 May 2021 at Barifa Playground and remain one point ahead of two teams tied in 2nd place. It was Arua Hill's 10th straight unbeaten game in the Big League. A 2nd-minute header from Allan Mugalu and 90th-minute solo strike by Baden helped Arua Hill defeat nine-man Mbale Heroes 2–0 in Barifa on 26 May 2021. In the West Nile Derby at Greenlight Stadium, Gadinho (10th minute) and Agau (14th minute) gave Arua Hill on the brink of qualification to top flight football a 2–0 away win against Calvary FC on the brink of relegation to the third league. A goalless draw at Kyabazinga Stadium in Bugembe on Wednesday 9 June 2021 maintained Arua Hill's three-point lead ahead of hosts Gaddafi in 2nd place. With one foot already in the UPL, Arua Hill needed only a draw at Barifa in the final game to qualify without any goal difference disputes. Gadinho (7th minute), Kawawa (30th and 58th) plus Okhuti (35th, his fifth of the season) gave AH a resounding 4–0 victory over relegated Paidha. This win ensured that they topped the Elgon Group and got promoted automatically to UPL on 13 June 2021. On 17 August 2021, a 25th-minute strike by Rashid Kawawa was enough for Arua Hill to be crowned StarTimes FUFA Big League champions (awarded 10 Million UgX) against Rwenzori Group winners Tooro United FC. Richard Anyama won the Goalkeeper of the Season award for 9 clean sheets out of 13 while Okhuti retired.

== History ==
According to club chairman Joel Aita, Arua Hill Sports Club rebranded in 2020 so as to have a local identity and also because of a strategic plan to accommodate "many talents" in other sports like basketball, volleyball, etc. In the first two years, they planned to qualify to the Ugandan Premier League and did it on 13 June 2021 plus have a strong academy by the fifth year. Arua Hill SC was founded on 10 February 2010 as Doves (United) FC by a group of passionate football teachers at Arua Primary School namely Mwalimu Omar Bashir (who became Adviser) and Coach Bosco Onama (who later joined Arua Hill as Head of Youth Development or Junior Team in 2020) but renamed Doves All Stars after a merger in 2014. Two years later, Doves beat Koboko Rising Stars 2–1 in the West Nile Regional League Playoffs to gain promotion to the StarTimes FUFA Big League; Doves then finished 8th, 6th, 7th and 6th in the 2020 Elgon Group of the BL. Challa Siva Koti and partners took over the club from Nasur Buga and Twaha Buga in 2018 with a vision of qualifying to Uganda's top tier in two years. Following the takeover, Challa the General Manager of Gittoe Pharmaceuticals renamed the club after Aziz Damani, the founder of the pharmacy. Doves still failed to qualify and was taken over by Aita in 2020.

Recruited players for the 2021 season included UPL veteran and Onduparaka FC legend Caesar Okhuti, former Ondu defender Muhammad Rashid, Express FC's relegation-surviving hero Alfred Leku, Vipers SC free agent Baden Mujahid Ogama, Dan Birikwalira, goalkeepers Isaac Mulindwa and Franco Oringa plus others. Their head coach was Hussein Mbalangu; his assistant was Joseph Kiwanuka.

== Crest ==
The club crest is a leopard on a rock encircled by a red ring with yellow and white arcs within. The name of the club is emblazoned in bold white capitalised fonts within the top half of the red ring. The motto written within the lower arc of the red ring is: "Together We Are Kongolo [Translated from Lugbara language: Strong]!" The club is nicknamed "The Leopards".

== Ground ==
Arua Hill SC temporarily plays its home games at Barifa Playground found in Barifa Forest, east of Arua Hill as the 20,000-seater Arua Hill Park Stadium continues to be constructed. It will become their official home some time later.

The game was the first for Arua Hill at their new home, having shifted from Barifa Stadium where they have played for the last two seasons.

== Records ==
- Charles Livingstone Mbabazi was the first Coach of Arua Hill in the Uganda Premier League
- First Win in Uganda Premier League: 0–2 at Wankulukuku Stadium v Express (also their First Game in top flight plus First Away Win), 15 October 2021
- First Loss: 2–1 v Mbarara City, 29 October 2021
- First Home Win: 3–2 v URA FC, 2 November 2021
- Samari Ajobe (shirt 5) is the Longest-serving Leopard since 2011 (for 10 years).
- Hussein Mbalangu was the first manager of the rebranded Arua Hill SC (2020) while Haruna Mawa was the last of the old Doves All Stars. Anthony Afeti replaced Benjamin Musoke immediately after the takeover as CEO while Adams Lematia (aka Otelul Vegas) became PRO.
- Biggest Home Win: 4–0 v Paidha Black Angels (Big League), 13 June 2021
- Biggest Away Win: 0–2 v Paidha (Big League), 25 April 2021
- Arua Hill went through the entire 2021 Big League season unbeaten and topped their Elgon Group plus clinched the Big League trophy after beating Tooro United (winners of the Rwenzori Group)

== Players ==
First team (2022 season)

1. Erick Kibowa, 2. Fred Okot, 3. Richard Matovu, 4. Junior Andama, 5. Innocent Maduka, 6. Yusuf Mafabi, 7. Gadafi Gadinho, 8. Allan Mugalu, 9. Brian Ade, 10. Wahab Gadafi, 11. Rashid Kawawa, 12. Rashid Toha (Captain), 13. David Ndihabwe, 14. Sharif Ssaaka, 15. Aggrey Atandu, 16. N/L, 17. Geriga Atendele, 18. Rogers Omedwa, 19. Alfred Leku, 20. Jacob Kamwesiga, 21. Patrick Matovu, 22. Robert Eseru, 23. Samuel Ssekamate, 24. Rashid Muhammad, 25. Ivan Eyamu, 26. Ibrahim Magandaazi, 27. Noah Sabir, 28. Jafari Karebi, 29. Innocent Media, 30. Bright Vuni, 31. Ibrahim Faizul, 32. Richard Anyama

First team squad jerseys (2021 season)

1. Oringa, 2. Onega, 3. Dan, 4. Okello, 5. Ajobe, 6. Agaba, 7. Gadinho, 8. Mugalu, 9. Ade, 10. Baden, 11. Kawawa, 12. Edema, 13. Yakin, 14. Muhumuza, 15. Atandu, 16. Kakooza, 17. Agau, 19. Leku, 20. Benard, 21. Matovu, 22. Mutebi, 23. Sabir, 24. Idi, 27. Innocent, 29. Okhuti, 30. Mimosa, 31. Telvin, 32. Anyama, 33. Mulindwa, 42. Rashid, 66. Aggrey, 87. Kawooya
