= Ora River =

River in Uganda

Coordinates: 2.6917°N 31.4497°E

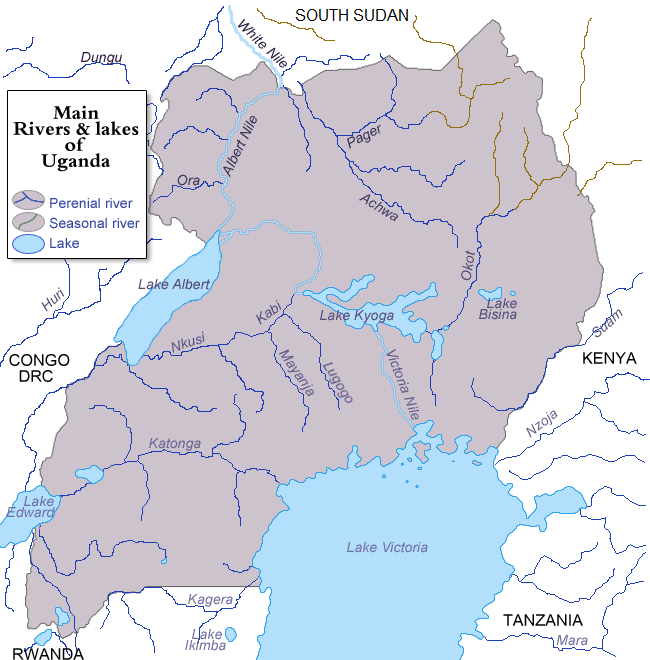
Rivers and lakes of Uganda

The Ora River is a river of West Nile, Northern Uganda. It is a tributary of the Albert Nile. It is located in the north-west of Uganda. It covers some part of Ugandan districts like Zombo District.
