= Paidha =

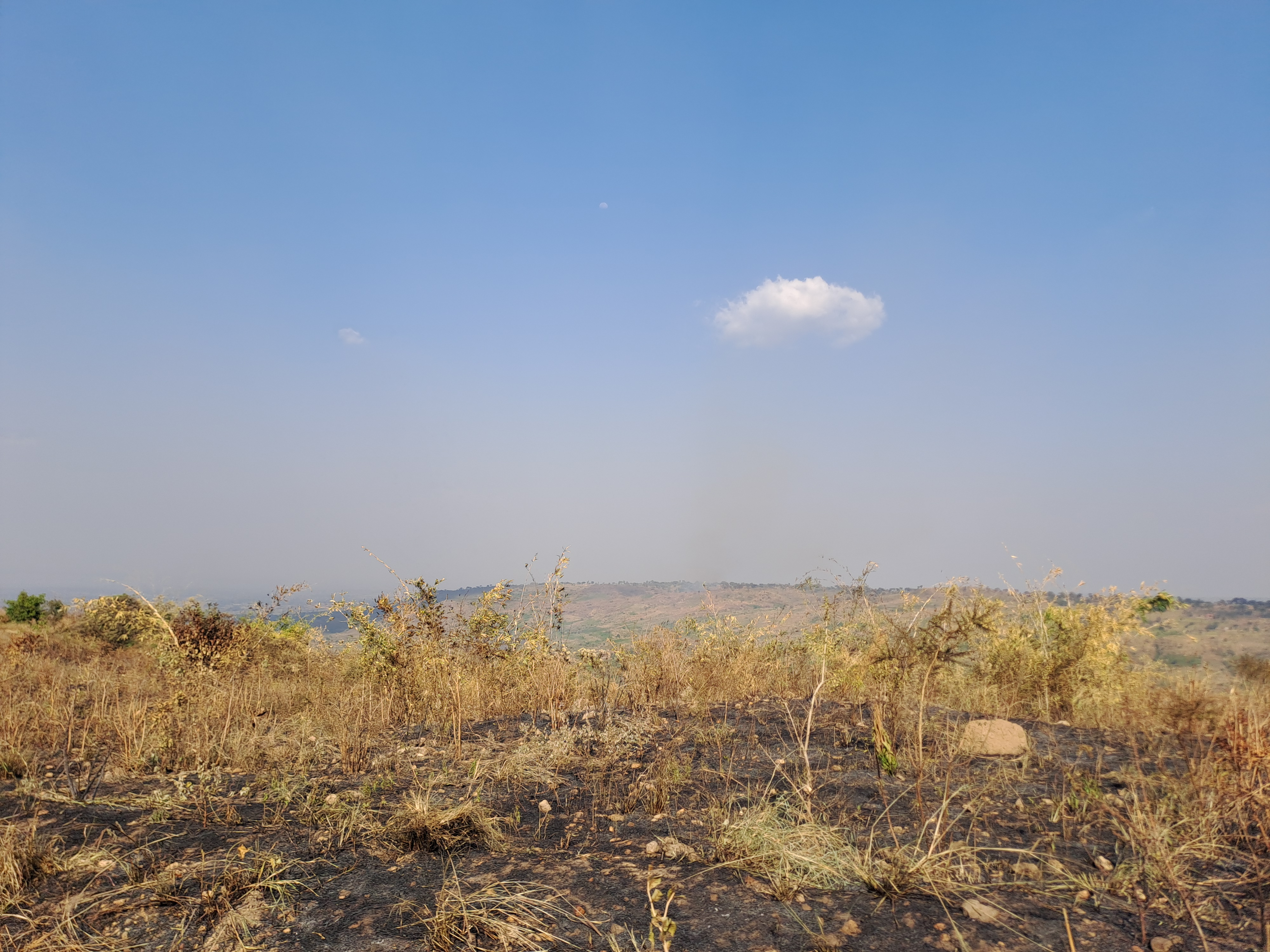
- Paidha

- Map of Uganda showing the location of Paidha
- Coordinates: 02°25′00″N 30°59′15″E
- Country: Uganda
- Region: Northern Region of Uganda
- Sub-region: West Nile sub-region
- District: Zombo District
- Elevation: 1,500 m (4,900 ft)

Population (2024 Census)
  - Total: 42,733
- Time zone: UTC+3 (EAT)

Paidha is a town in the Northern Region of Uganda.

== History ==
On 13 February 1965, Paidha and Goli were bombed by the Congolese Air Force in retaliation for the support of the Ugandan government for Simba rebels. The attack caused minimal damage. Paidha is also known for Got Aminzi, and also the best town in Uganda where Rubutsa coffee are grow.

== Geography ==
Paidha is in Zombo District, West Nile sub-region. The town is near the border with the Democratic Republic of the Congo. It is approximately 95 kilometres (59 mi), by road, south of Arua, the largest city in the sub-region. This is approximately 196 kilometres (122 mi), by road, southwest of Gulu, the largest city in the Northern Region of Uganda. Zombo, the town where the district headquarters are located, is approximately 16 kilometres (9.9 mi), by road, northwest of Paidha. The coordinates of Paidha are 2°25'00.0"N, 30°59'15.0"E (Latitude:2.416667; Longitude:30.987500).

== Overview ==
Paidha is a busy border town in northwest Uganda at its border with the DRC. In 2013, it was the second-busiest border crossing between Uganda and the DRC, based on the volume of informal exports and imports.

Uganda border towns' market share of crossborder informal trade with the DRC in 2013
Rank	Border town	Share of exports	Share of imports
1	Mpondwe	71.0%	50.8%
2	Paidha	6.6%	22.6%
3	Odramachaku	7.3%	7.9%
4	Vurra	3.8%	9.0%
5	Bunagana	3.6%	5.6%
6	Ntoroko	5.5%	1.7%
7	Others	2.2%	2.4%

== Population ==
The 2002 national census estimated the population of Paidha at 24,079 and in 2010 the Uganda Bureau of Statistics, estimated the population of the town at 29,700. In 2011, UBOS estimated the mid-year population of Paidha at 30,500. In 2014, the population census put the population of the town at 33,426.

In 2015, the population of the town was projected at 32,300. In 2020, Paidha's mid-year population was projected at 37,500. It was calculated that the population of the town increased at an average annual rate of 3.0 percent, between 2015 and 2020.

Historical population
Year	Pop.	±%
2002	24,079	—
2010	20,100	−16.5%
2011	20,900	+4.0%
2014	33,426	+59.9%
2015	32,300	−3.4%
2020	37,500	+16.1%

== Points of interest ==
The following additional points of interest lie within the town limits or close to the edges of town:

- The offices of Paidha Town Council
- The international border between Uganda and the DRC is at Goli, about 8 kilometres (5 mi) southeast of Paidha
- Paidha Primary Teachers College, a public teacher training college administered by the Ministry of Education and Sports
- Nyagak Power Station, a 3.5 megawatt hydropower station operated by WENRECO, a subsidiary of Industrial Promotion Services
- Nyagak III Power Station, a 4.36 megawatt hydropower station under development by the Uganda Electricity Generation Company Limited
- Paidha Health Centre III

== See also ==
- List of power stations in Uganda
- List of cities and towns in Uganda
