= German Investment Corporation =

Development bank in Cologne, Germany

DEG - Deutsche Investitions- und Entwicklungsgesellschaft mbH

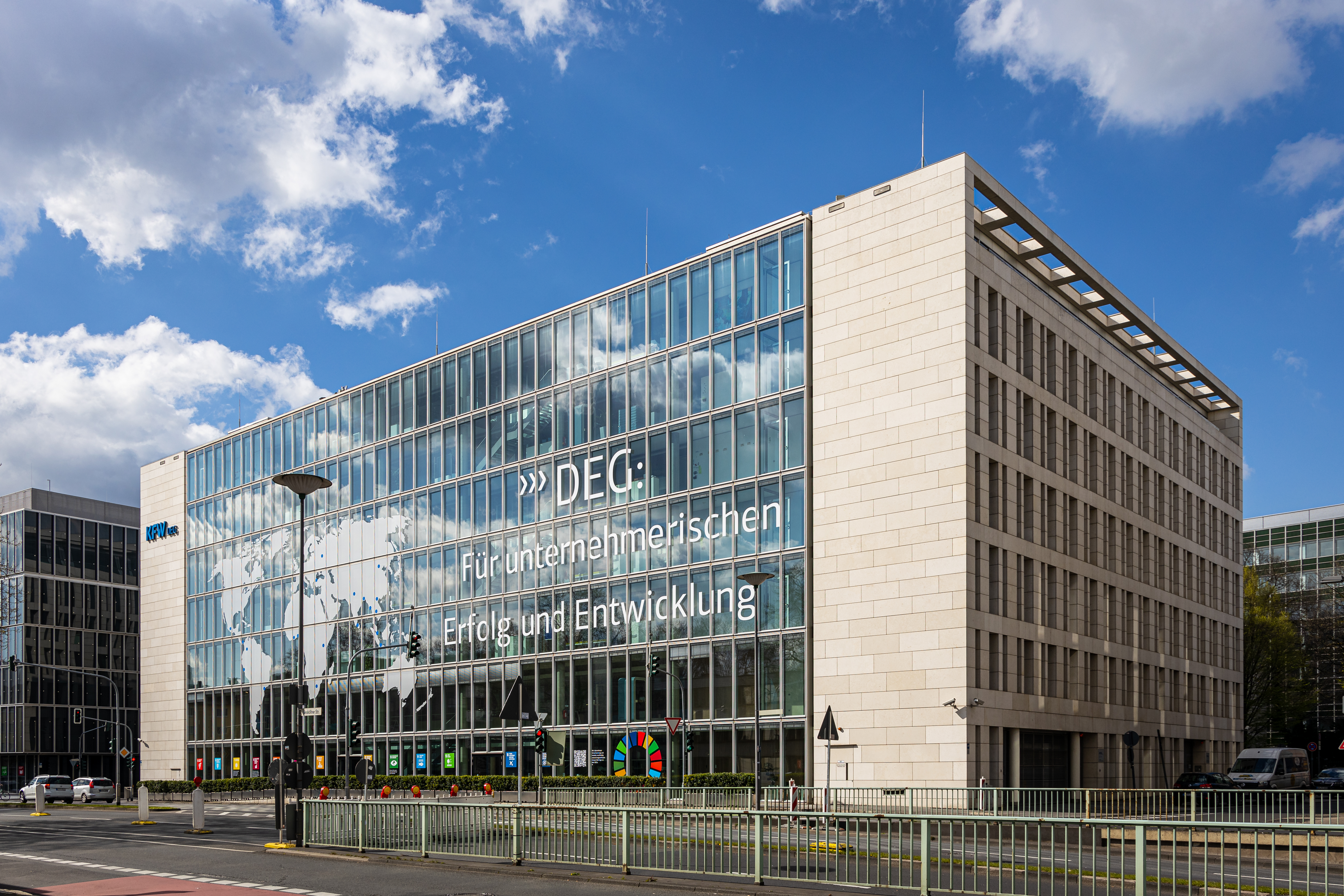
- Headquarters in Cologne
- Type: Private
- Industry: Development Finance
- Founded: 1962; 64 years ago
- Headquarters: Cologne, Germany
- Key people: Roland Siller (CEO); Monika Beck; Philipp Kreutz
- Products: Loans, Equity Financing, Feasibility Studies, Advisory Services, Consulting
- Total assets: Balance sheet total €9 billion (2024)
- Number of employees: 730 (2025)
- Parent: KfW
- Website: deginvest.de/index-2.html

DEG - Deutsche Investitions- und Entwicklungsgesellschaft (which translates as German Investment and Development Corporation) is a Development Finance Institution (DFI) and a subsidiary of KfW Group. It was founded in Cologne in September 1962 as a federally owned company by the former Federal President Walter Scheel. Since its foundation, DEG has been headquartered in Cologne. In 2008, DEG moved into a modern, energy efficient office building in the city centre. DEG has 17 representative offices across the world, inter alia in Bangkok, Beijing, Istanbul, Jakarta, Johannesburg, Lagos, Lima, Mexico City, Nairobi, New Delhi, São Paulo and Singapore. In 2025, DEG employed a staff of approximately 730, both in Germany and abroad. It facilitated private investments in developing and emerging countries by making available a total business volume of EUR 2.9 billion, the majority of which – around EUR 2.4 billion – was provided from own funds.

With a portfolio of around EUR 11.7 billion in nearly 80 countries DEG is one of the world's largest private-sector development financiers.

== Mission and products ==
DEG finances long-term investments of private companies in developing and emerging-market countries. As one of the world's largest development finance institutions, it promotes private sector companies to contribute to sustainable economic growth and improved living conditions in these countries.

DEG focuses on projects and corporate finance in Africa, Asia, and Latin America, as well as in Central, Eastern and South-Eastern Europe. Its financing products, which are offered at market-oriented conditions, comprise:

- Business support services
- Equity capital
- Guarantees
- Long-term loans
- Mezzanine financing

Among DEG's customers are corporates, financial institutions, funds and project financiers. Moreover, DEG offers advisory services, which are offered to both companies willing to invest and institutions promoting private-sector cooperation in its partner countries. Furthermore, DEG - as one of the two official partners - implements the develoPPP programme of the Federal German Ministry for Economic Co-operation and Development (BMZ). develoPPP targets companies that invest in developing and emerging-market countries and are seeking ways to shape their corporate commitment in the long term. These develoPPP funds are mainly allotted to projects concerning environment, training and upskilling, workplace security and to outstanding pilot projects.

Since 2017, DEG offers financial support and solutions via German Desks together with local partner banks and local German Chambers of Commerce Abroad. A local bank employee who operates in both languages and cultures, handles particular needs of German firms or supports investment financing for local companies wishing to acquire German equipment, for example.

In all its financing activities, DEG applies the IFC Performance Standards, including the relevant "Environment, Health and Safety" guidelines as well as the ILO standards. The Performance Standards, developed by the International Financing Corporation (IFC), are the most widely used assessment standards in international development financing.

To ensure individuals, groups, communities or any other parties who believe to be adversely affected by a project financed or planned by DEG the right to be heard and the right to complain, DEG developed an Independent Complaint Mechanism (ICM) including an independent expert panel. The panel decides whether the complaint is admissible, responds to the complaint and is responsible for taking further possible steps.

== Contribution to the SDGs ==
Being part of the German development cooperation, DEG promotes and contributes to the 2030 Agenda including the Sustainable Development Goals (SDGs) adopted by the UN. Among these goals is the reduction of poverty by promoting job creation and income generation in less developed and rural regions. Moreover, DEG's customers employed more than 1.5 million people, produced green energy for around 26 million people and generated local income of EUR 67 million. In 2017, 72% of the companies supported by DEG contributed to the alleviation of poverty (SDG No. 1), and 88% of them fostered decent work and economic growth (SDG No. 8).

== Cooperation ==
DEG closely coordinates its promotional activities with other European Development Finance Institutions, many of which have joined in the association of the European Development Finance Institutions (EDFI). Further cooperation partners of DEG are the International Finance Corporation (IFC), a member of the World Bank, the European Bank for Reconstruction and Development (EBRD), as well as numerous local and regional development companies. The pooling of financing capacities and in-house knowledge leads to broader developmental efficacy and greater sustainability.

== KfW Group ==
KfW is the parent company of DEG. The subsidiaries of KfW include:

- KfW IPEX-Bank GmbH – Provides project and corporate finance and offers trade and export finance in Germany and abroad.
- DEG – Deutsche Investitions- und Entwicklungsgesellschaft mbH – Promotes private sector initiatives in developing and emerging countries.
- FuB – Finanzierungs- und Beratungsgesellschaft mbH (FuB) – handling of special tasks associated with the German reunification.
- dena – The Deutsche Energie-Agentur GmbH (dena), a 26% subsidiary of KfW Bankengruppe, promotes the rational and environmentally friendly production and use of energy including renewable energies.

== See also ==
- Federal Republic of Germany
- Netherlands Development Finance Company (FMO), Netherlands DFI
- PROPARCO, French DFI
