= Nebbi =

- Location in Uganda
- Coordinates: 02°28′45″N 31°05′24″E
- Country: Uganda
- Region: Northern Region of Uganda
- Sub-region: West Nile sub-region
- District: Nebbi District
- Elevation: 3,287 ft (1,002 m)

Population (2024 Census)
  - Total: 49,191

Nebbi is a town in the Nebbi District of the Northern Region of Uganda. It is the site of the district headquarters.

== Location ==
Nebbi is located in the West Nile sub-region, along the Karuma–Olwiyo–Pakwach–Nebbi–Arua Road, approximately 80 kilometres (50 mi) south-east of Arua, the largest city in the West Nile sub-region. This is approximately 173 kilometres (107 mi), by road, south-west of Gulu, the largest city in the Northern Region of Uganda. The coordinates of the town are 2°28'45.0"N, 31°05'24.0"E (Latitude:2.479167; Longitude:31.0900). Nebbi Town sits at an average elevation of 1,002 metres (3,287 ft), above mean sea level.

== Population ==
The 2002 national census put the population of Nebbi at about 22,740. In 2010, the Uganda Bureau of Statistics (UBOS) estimated the population at 28,000. In 2011, the UBOS estimated the mid-year population at 28,800. The 2014 census put the population at 35,029.

In 2020, the UBOS estimated the mid-year population of Nebbi Town Council at 41,400 people. The population agency calculated the annual population growth rate of the municipality at 2.9 percent, between 2014 and 2020.

Historical population
Year	Pop.	±%
2002	22,740	—
2010	28,000	+23.1%
2011	28,800	+2.9%
2014	35,029	+21.6%
2020	41,400	+18.2%

== Points of interest ==
The following additional points of interest lie in the town or near the town limits:

1. The Offices of Nebbi District Local Government Headquarters

2. The Offices of Nebbi Municipal Council

3. Nebbi Central Market

4. Nebbi General Hospital, a 108-bed public hospital owned by the Uganda Ministry of Health and administered by Nebbi District Local Government.

5. Nebbi Airstrip, owned by the Uganda Civil Aviation Authority

6. Nyacara Church, a place of worship affiliated with the Church of Uganda

7. Afere Church, a place of worship affiliated with the Church of Uganda

8. The headquarters of the Roman Catholic Diocese of Nebbi

9. Nebbi Town Public Library

10. Nebbi Roman Catholic Cathedral.

== Photos ==
- Aerial Photo of Nebbi Town
