= Arua District =

- District
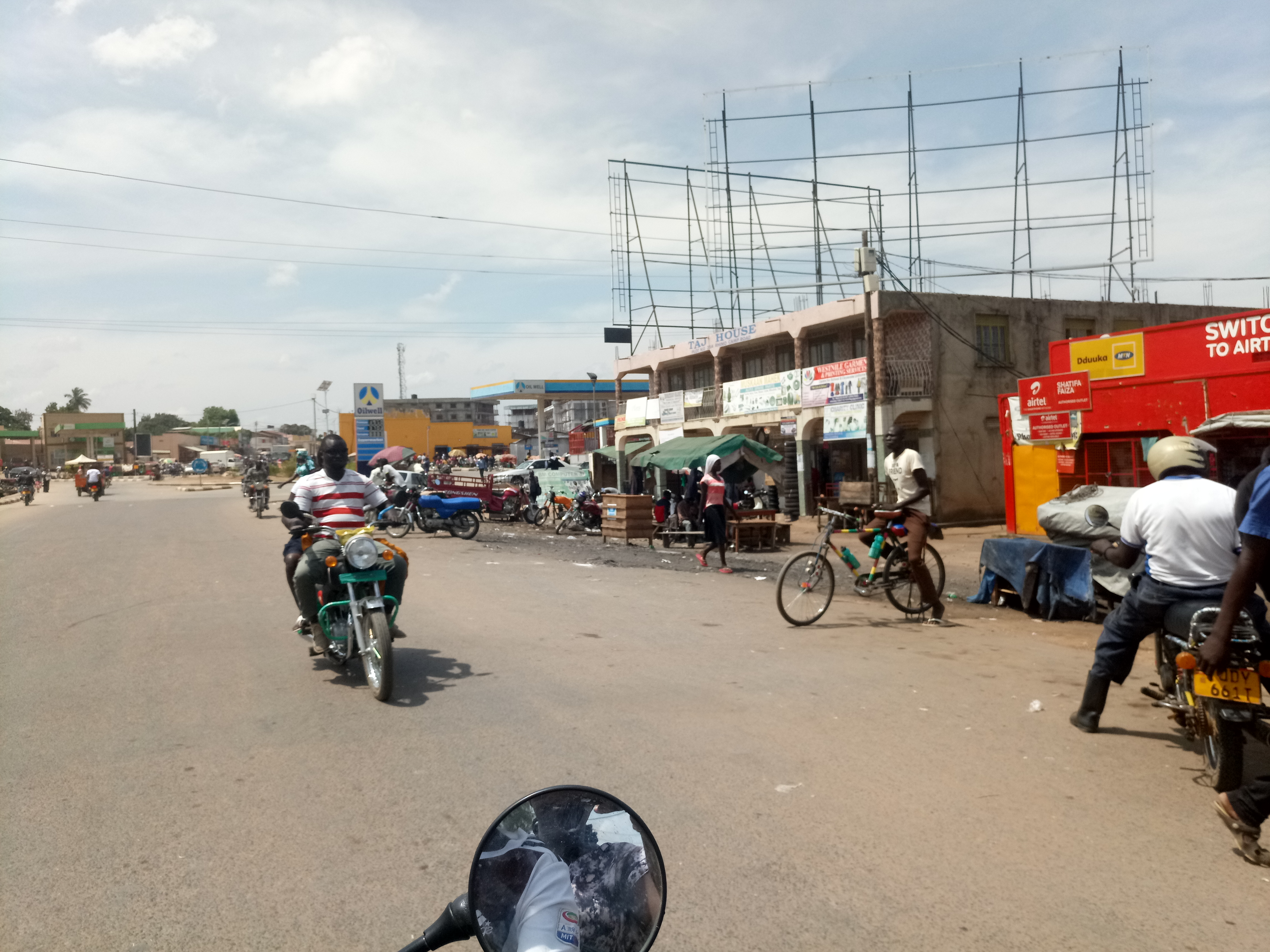
- Motorcyclists in Arua Town

- District location in Uganda
- Coordinates: 03°00′N 31°10′E
- Country: Uganda
- Region: Northern Uganda
- Sub-region: West Nile sub-region
- Capital: Arua

Area
  - Land: 3,236.4 km^{2} (1,249.6 sq mi)

Population (2012 Estimate)
  - Total: 776,700
  - Density: 240/km^{2} (620/sq mi)
- Time zone: UTC+3 (EAT)
- Website: www.arua.go.ug

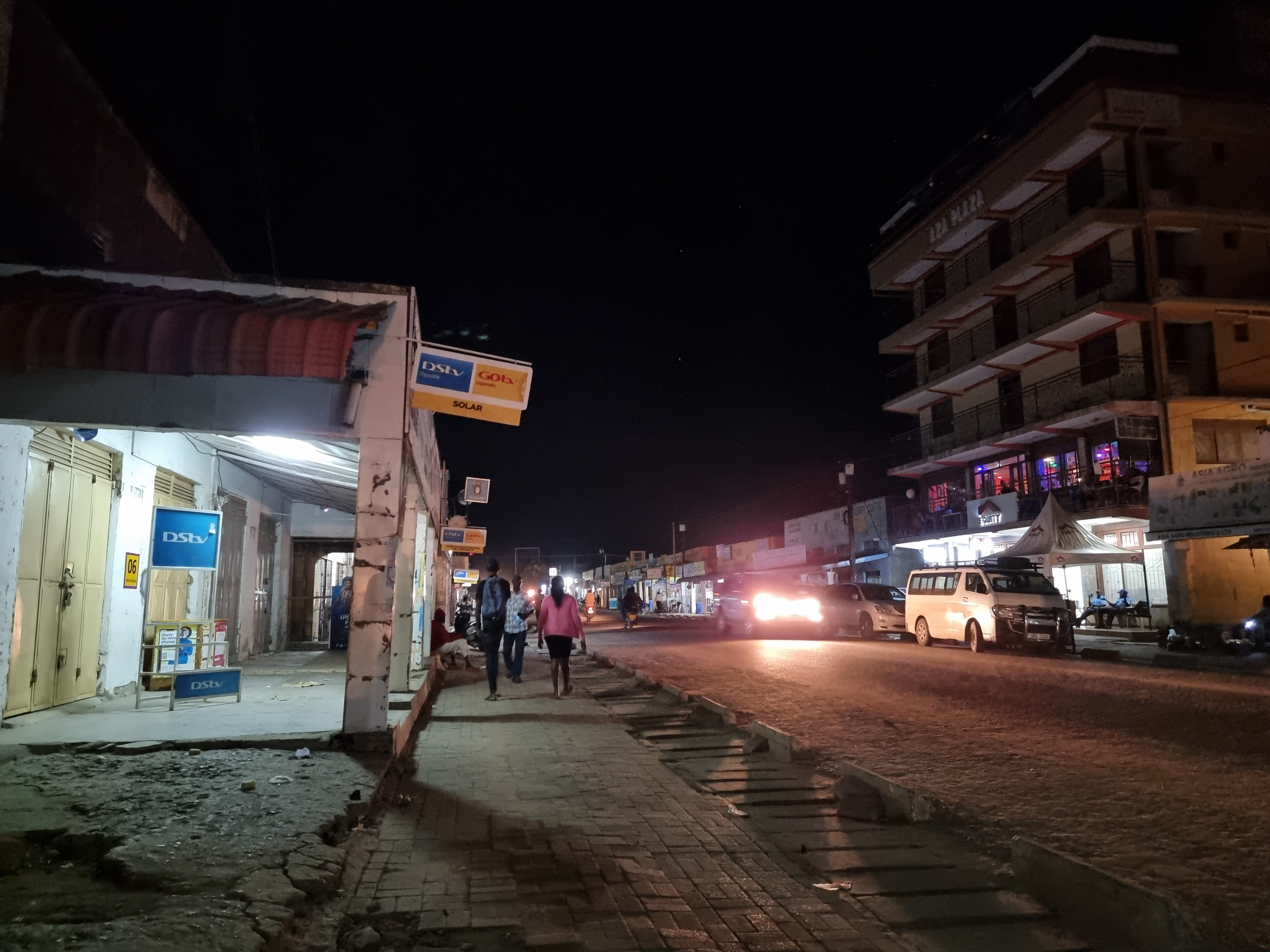
Arua city at night

Arua District is a district in the Northern Region of Uganda. Like many Ugandan districts, it too shares its name with its administrative center of Arua. The name Arua is said to be derived from the Lugbara name for prison (Arujo) and prisoner (Aru), since the white settlers (Belgians and later British) had a detention center at Arua Hill.

== Location ==
Arua District is bordered by Yumbe District to the north, Adjumani District to the northeast, Amuru District to the east, Nebbi District to the southeast, Zombo District to the southwest, the Democratic Republic of the Congo (DRC) to the west, and Maracha District to the northwest. The district headquarters at Arua are located about 425 kilometres (264 mi), by road, northwest of Kampala, the capital and largest city of Uganda. The coordinates of the district are:03 00N, 31 10E.

== History ==
Arua District has historically served as an important administrative and commercial centre in the West Nile sub-region.The district was originally much larger and included present-day:

- Yumbe District
- Koboko District
- Maracha District
- Terego District
- Madi-Okollo District

== Ethnicities ==
The largest ethnic group in the district is the Lugbara people.The Lugbara are known for their rich cultural heritage, traditional music and clan system and agricultural livelihoods. Cultural institutions continue to play an important role in community identity and social cohesion throughout the district.

== Aministrative structure ==
Following the creation of new districts and the establishment of Arua City in 2020, the remaining district is considerably smaller than its historical boundaries. Today, the district mainly comprises Vurra County and surrounding rural sub-counties, while Arua City functions as a separate local government entity.

== Overview ==
Arua District got its name from Arua town. In the late 1970s, the Ugandan president at the time Godfrey Binaisa declared that all districts/provinces acquire their names from their regional capital so that is how Arua district inherited the name from Arua town.The district originally included Aringa County, which was later split off to become Yumbe District.

The district is the birthplace of former President Idi Amin. Arua District was a springboard for some units of the Uganda People's Defense Force who entered the DRC at the beginning of the Second Congo War.

Arua District is a peaceful district save for the disruption caused in the late 1990s by the Lord's Resistance Army rebels on the Karuma-Pakwach road that provides the main road link into the district. In 2005, the northeastern part of the district was split off as the separate, new district of Koboko District.

Arua District has five counties after three of the original six counties were split off. Koboko was granted district status. Maracha was, in 2006, also granted district status (Maracha District). Initially, Terego County was also included in Maracha District (Maracha-Terego District). However, failing to agree on where the new district headquarters should be located, Terego County opted to remain part of the larger Arua District. Later, Terego and Madi-Okollo were each offered district statuses effective July 2020. The remaining counties in Arua District are: Vurra and Ayivu; where the Arua District headquarters are located.

== Population ==
The 1991 national census estimated the population of the district at about 368,200. In 2002, the national census gave a population estimate of 559,100, with an annual growth rate of 4 percent. In 2012, the population of Arua District was estimated at 776,700.

== Economic activities ==
Located in a corner of the country that borders both South Sudan and the DRC, a significant amount of local economic activity is the result of cross-border trade. Agriculture is the backbone of Arua District's economy:

=== Food and cash crops ===
- Groundnuts
- Beans
- Maize
- Millet
- Simsim
- Mangoes
- Avocado
- Cassava
- Matooke
- Okra Flowers
- Tobacco
- Red Chili Pepper

=== Domesticated livestock and other fauna ===
- African goats
- Boer goats
- Hybrid goats
- Broilers
- Layers
- Fish farming
- Pigs
- Bee keeping

Fish farming has also expanded in recent years, supplemented by fishing activities along water bodies connected to the River Nile system.

Due to a high influx of refugees from South Sudan (estimated at 50,000 at one time), the natural environment in the district has been severely stressed, causing deforestation in some areas. The refugee population extensively engages in the growth of tobacco to raise cash for survival putting severe pressure on land leaving the land bare due to deforestation

In 2008 and 2009, honey is steadily replacing tobacco as a leading income stream, with a ready international market. Piggery is also on the increase in the district. The district produces about 30 tons of fish from over 600 private fish farms and from the River Nile. The district has about 117,000 head of local Zebu cattle. However the district milk output remains low.

The biggest asset of the district is perhaps the continued prevalence of peace and security for the last 25 years and denunciation of rebellion which has attracted many developmental projects. Major achievements include infrastructural transformation such as the tarmacking of the Arua to Karuma Highway, the West Nile Rural Electrification Project and numerous telephone communication networks that have been established in the region. During 2013, the tarmacking of the Vurra-Arua-Koboko-Oraba Road began.

== Environment ==
The district has experienced environmental challenges associated with rapid population growth, agricultural expansion, and refugees settlements from neighbouring countries, particularly south sudan. These pressures have contributed to deforestation and land degradation in some areas, prompting government and development partners to promote sustainable land management and environmental conservation initiatives.

== Infrastructure ==
Over the two decades, Arua District has experienced significant infrastructure development. Major improvements include:

- Upgrading of the Arua- Karuma Highway
- Construction and rehabilitation of feeder roads
- Expansion of rural electrification programmes
- Growth of telecommunication networks
- Improvement of water and sanitation facilities

The development of Vurra-Arua-Koboko-Oraba Road has further enhanced regional connectivity and trade within the west Nile sub-region and neighbouring countries.

== See also ==
- Arua Airport
- West Nile sub-region
- Districts of Uganda
- Lugbara cuisine
- Ombaci
- Parliament of Uganda
- Arua city
