= Nebbi District =

- District
- District location in Uganda
- Coordinates: 02°27′N 31°15′E
- Country: Uganda
- Region: Northern Uganda
- Sub-region: West Nile sub-region
- Capital: Nebbi

Area
  - Total: 1,953.2 km^{2} (754.1 sq mi)

Population (2012 Estimate)
  - Total: 346,200
  - Density: 177.2/km^{2} (459/sq mi)
- Time zone: UTC+3 (EAT)
- Website: www.nebbi.go.ug

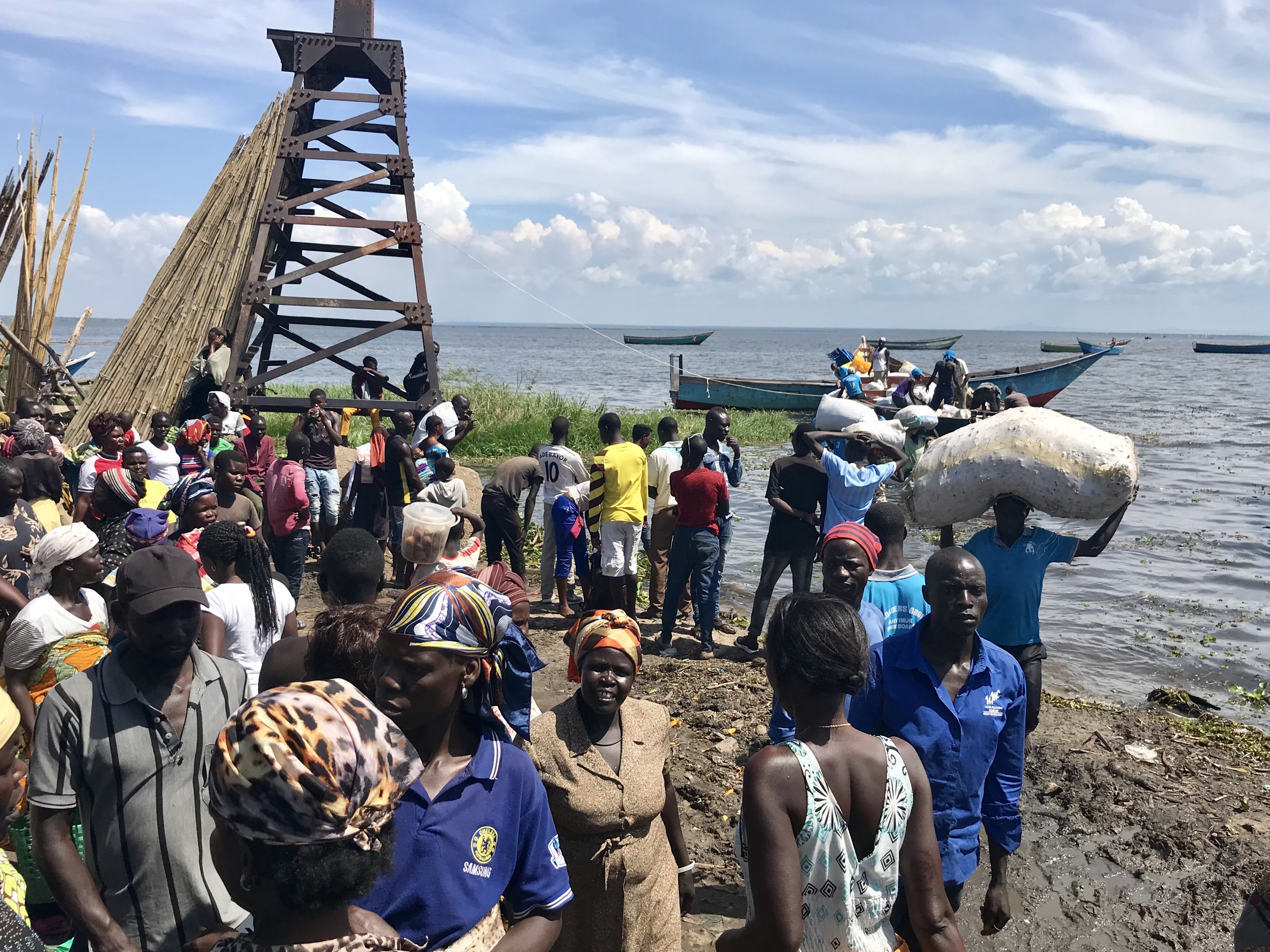
Men carry cargo from Panyimur landing site in Nebbi District

Nebbi District is a district in Northern Uganda. It is named after its main municipal, commercial and administrative centre, Nebbi, the location of the district headquarters.

== Location ==
Nebbi District is bordered by Madi Okollo District to the north, Pakwach District to the east, Democratic Republic of the Congo (DRC) to the south and Zombo District to the west. Nebbi, where the district headquarters are located approximately 77 kilometres (48 mi), by road, southeast of Arua, is the largest town in the sub-region. The coordinates of the district are:02 27N, 31 15E (Latitude:2.4500; Longitude:31.2500).

== Overview ==
The district has one county (Padyere). In 2010, Okoro County was split off Nebbi District to form Zombo District and in 2017,(Jonam) which was one of the counties that made up Nebbi was split off to form Pakwach District. There is a small airstrip near Nebbi which can be reached using commercial flights from Entebbe Airport. A railway link which has not run for many years used to link the district to the rest of the Uganda Railway system.

There is a Catholic cathedral in Nebbi, and the Anglican diocese is based in Goli, a town situated at the border with the Democratic Republic of the Congo, about 15 kilometres (9.3 mi), by road south of Nebbi. The first bishop of the Anglican diocese of Nebbi was Henry Luke Orombi, who is the immediate past archbishop of the Church of Uganda. The first bishop of Nebbi Catholic diocese was John Baptist Odama. He is currently the archbishop of the Roman Catholic Archdiocese of Gulu.

== Population ==
The 1991 census estimated the district population at about 185,550. The 2002 census estimated the population of the district at approximately 226,310. The annual population growth rate of the district was calculated at 2.7%. In 2012, it was estimated that the population of Nebbi District was about 346,200. The table below illustrates the growth of the district population between 2002 and 2012. All figures are estimates.

Nebbi District Population Trends

Year	Est. Pop.
2002	266,300
2003	273,500
2004	280,900
2005	288,500

Year	Est. Pop.
2006	296,300
2007	304,300
2008	312,500
2009	320,900

Year	Est. Pop.
2010	329,600
2011	338,500

== Ethnicities ==
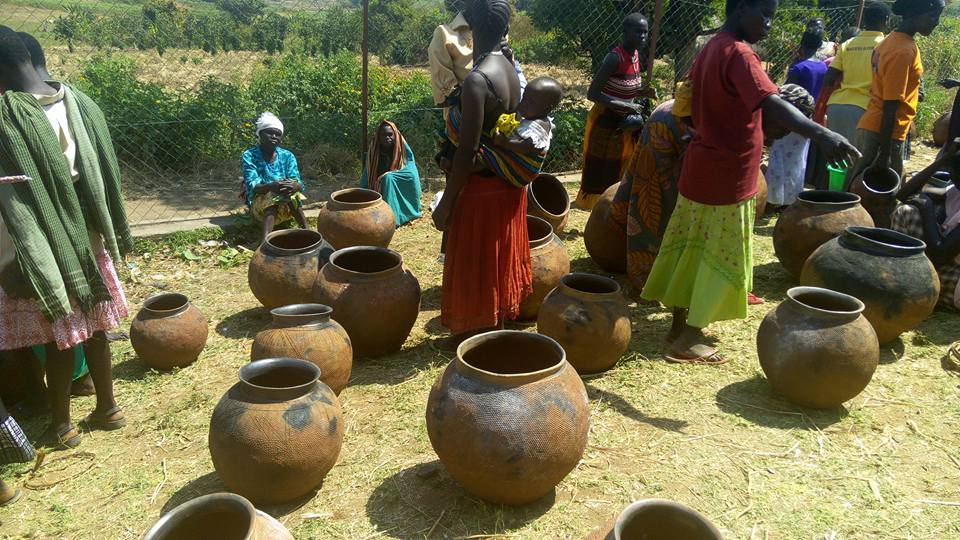
POTTERY TRADE IN ANYIRIBO NEBBI

The predominant ethnicity in the district are the Alur, with the languages spoken being Alur.

== Gender ==
Girls are often married very young and do not complete Primary Leaving Examinations. In 2018 the drop-out rate for girls was 64%.

== Economic activities ==
Agriculture (crop agriculture and animal husbandry), together with fishing are the main economic activities in the district. Crops grown include:

- Coffee
- Tea
- Cotton
- Cassava
- Potatoes
- Sweet potatoes
- Sorghum
- Millet
- Maize
- Rice
- Simsim
- Sunflower
- Soybeans
- Cashew nut
- Okra
- Tomatoes
- Cabbage
- Onions
- Green vegetables
- Pineapples
- Oranges
- Mangoes
- Chili peppers

Fishing on Lake Albert and in the Albert Nile is practiced widely for subsistence and commercial purposes. Common species of fish include Nile Perch (Lates Niloticus) and Tilapia (Oreochromis Niloticus). Local rivers in the district, such as the Nyagak and Namrwodho Rivers, also afford fishing opportunities to those far removed from Lake Albert and the Nile River.

== Governance ==
In 2019, the area's representative in parliament was Rama Jacqueline Aol.

== Livestocks ==
- Cattle
- Chicken
- Goat
- Pigs
- Sheep
- Duck
- Turkey

== See also ==
- Nebbi
- West Nile sub-region
- Northern Region, Uganda
- Districts of Uganda
- Parliament of Uganda
