= Zombo District =

- District
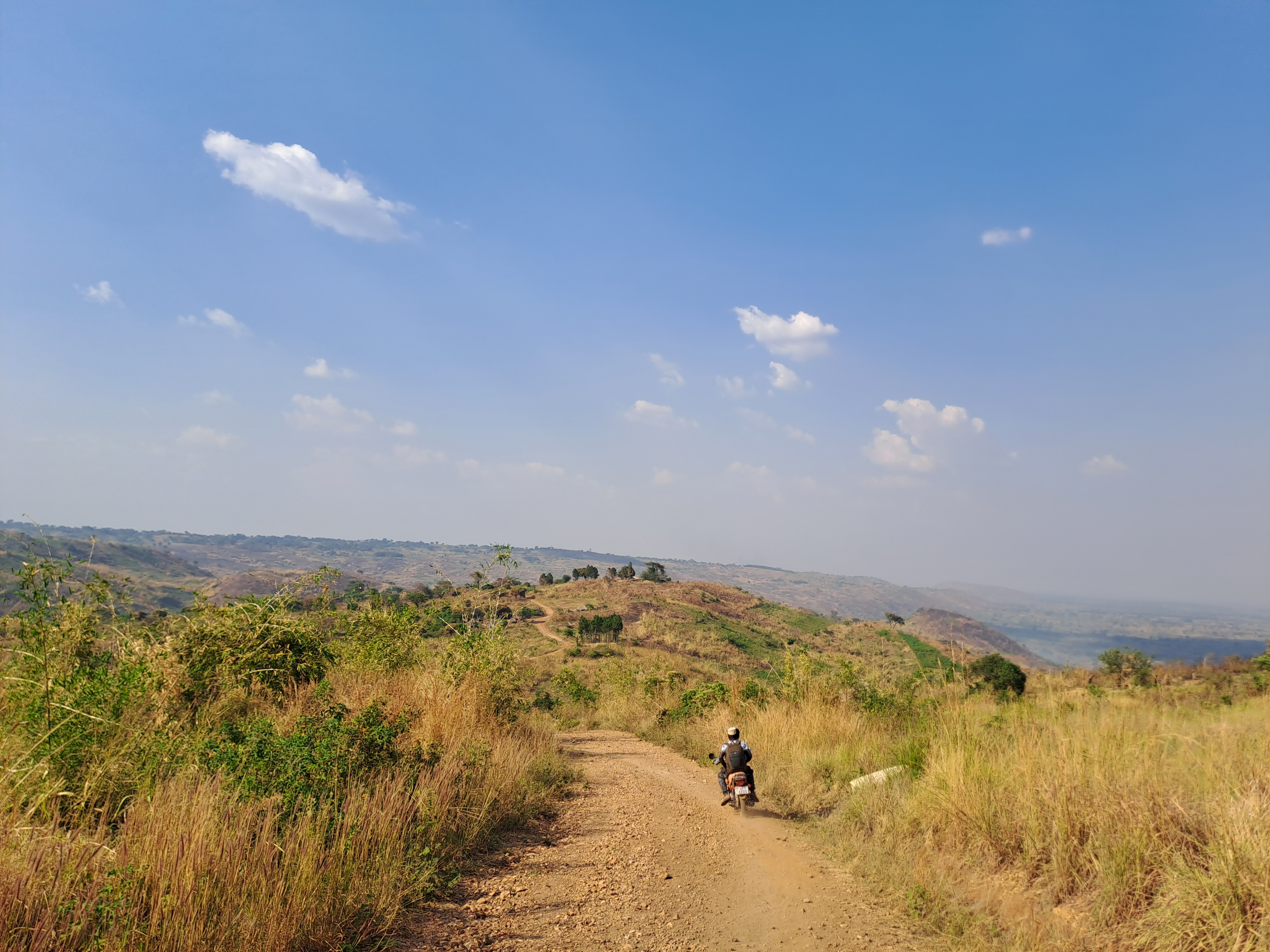

- District location in Uganda
- Coordinates: 02°30′N 30°54′E
- Country: Uganda
- Region: Northern Uganda
- Sub-region: West Nile sub-region
- Capital: Zombo

Area
  - Total: 897.6 km^{2} (346.6 sq mi)

Population (2014)
  - Total: 240,081
  - Density: 267.5/km^{2} (692.7/sq mi)
- Time zone: UTC+3 (EAT)
- Website: www.zombo.go.ug

Zombo District is a district in the Northern Region of Uganda. The town of Zombo is the district's main municipal, administrative, and commercial center.

== Location ==
Zombo District is bordered by Arua District to the north, Nebbi District to the east, and the Democratic Republic of the Congo to the south and west. The town of Zombo, where the district headquarters are located, is approximately 70 kilometres (43 mi) south of Arua, the largest city in the sub-region. This is approximately 382 kilometres (237 mi), by road, northwest of Kampala, the capital and largest city of Uganda. The coordinates of the district are 02 30N, 30 54E.

== Administrative divisions ==
The district was created by Act of Parliament and became functional on 1 July 2009. Prior to then, the district was part of the Nebbi District.

Zombo District is split into two counties, each with its own constituency. Before 2015, the district consisted of only one county (Okoro).

Ora County takes up the north and the southwest of the district. The 2014 population was 111,119, with the most residents in Zeu at 35,354.

Okoro County takes up the south of the district. The 2014 population was 128,962, with the most residents in Paidha TC at 31,632.

The counties are further divided into a total of 15 sub-counties and town councils (Abanga, Atyak, Jangokoro, Kango, Nyapea, Paidha, Paidha Town Council, Padea Town Council, Warr Town Council, Warr, Zeu, Zombo Town Council, Athuma, Akaa and Alangi), with 68 parishes covering 824 villages.

== Ethnicities ==
The Alur people ethnic group comprise over 90% of the population. The other three ethnic groups are the Lendu, Lugbara, and Kebu.

Due to its proximity with DR Congo, Zombo District hosts thousands of Alur refugees fleeing the Ituri conflict since 2019. Zombo District has been both willing to accept and capable of housing the refugees, declining offers to relocate them to Imvepi Refugee Settlement near Arua. Some difficulties have been faced in the health sector due to the absence of a rehabilitation center.

== Population ==
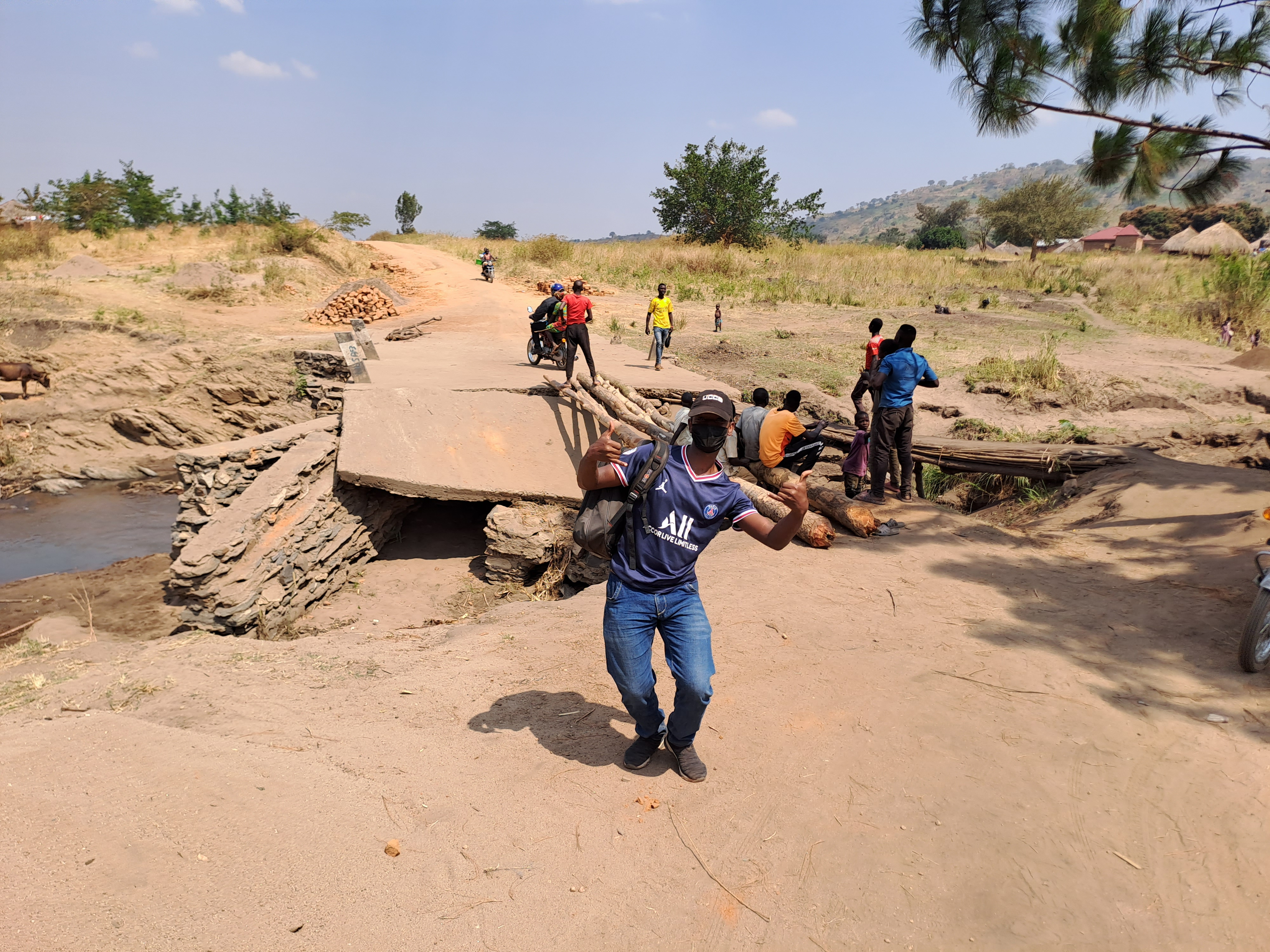
Happy man after crossing a broken down Bridge in Paidha Zombo

The 1991 census estimated the district population at 131,300. The 2002 national census estimated the population at 169,000. In 2012, the population was estimated at 219,800.

== Ethnic groups and languages ==
The Alur ethnic group constitutes over 90% of the population in Zombo District. Other ethnic groups include:

- Lendu
- Lugbara
- Kakwa

The most widely spoken languages include Alur, English and Swahihi, especially in trading centres and borders

== Refugees and cross- border migration ==
Due to its proximity to the Democratic Republic of Congo, Zombo District has hosted refugees fleeing insecurity in eastern Congo, particularly from Ituri conflict. The influx of refugees has placed pressure on local services, particularly healthcare and education. However, cross- border movement also contributes to trade and cultural exchange between communities.

== Economy ==
Zombo TC is a breadbasket of the West Nile sub-region, also attracting buyers from South Sudan, but has faced difficulties in export due to complicated and unmaintained roads.

- Maize
- Beans
- Cassava
- Tobacco
- Sweet potatoes
- Millet
- Sorghum
- Groundnuts
- Trade and Commerce
- Fishing
- Livestock Farming
- Tea
- Potatoes

== Cash crops ==
- Tobacco
- Coffee
- Tea
- Irish potatoes

Irish potato farming has incresingly become an important income source, particularly in areas such as Zeu, Nyapea and Jangokoro.

== Livestock ==
- Cattle
- Goat
- Sheep
- Pigs
- Poultry

== Trade and commerce ==
Zombo District is characterized by rolling highlands, fertile valleys and forest reserves. The climate is generally favourable for agriculture, with moderate rainfall throughout the year.

== Infrastructure ==
The District faces infrastructure challenges, particularly poor road networks, which affect transportation and agriculture trade. Despite this, road improvements and agricultural development initiatives continue to be implemented.

== See also ==
- Districts of Uganda
- Northern Region, Uganda
- Parliament of Uganda
- West Nile sub-region
- Nebbi District
