= West Nile sub-region =

Sub-region in north-western Uganda

Coordinates: 03°00′N 31°12′E

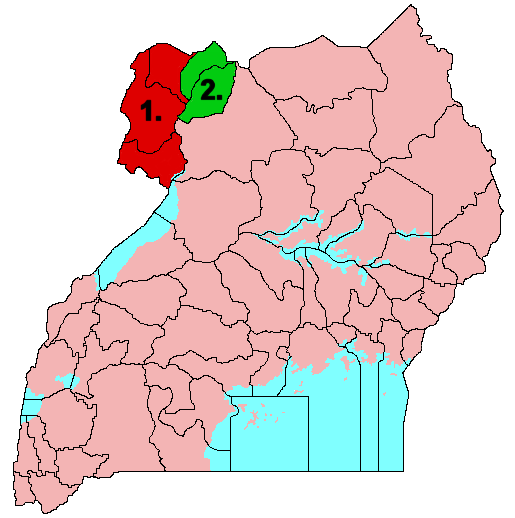
West Nile sub-region 1960s - 1970s: 1. + 2. - Original West Nile District until 1950s; 1. - West Nile district 1960s - 1970s; 2. - Former East Madi District (later Adjumani District) since 1960s

West Nile sub-region, previously known as West Nile Province and West Nile District, is a sub-region in north-western Uganda, in the Northern Region of Uganda.

== Location ==
The sub-region is bordered by the Democratic Republic of the Congo to the south and west, by South Sudan to the north and by the Albert Nile to the east. The town of Arua, is the largest town in the sub-region. Arua lies approximately 475 kilometres (295 mi), by road, northwest of Kampala, the capital of Uganda, and the largest city in that country.

== Overview ==
West Nile sub-region consists of the following districts, as of July 1, 2021:

- Adjumani District
- Arua City
- Arua District
- Koboko District
- Maracha District
- Terego District
- Madi-Okollo District
- Moyo District
- Nebbi District
- Yumbe District
- Zombo District
- Obongi District

The sub-region received its name from being located on the western side of the Albert Nile. Military leader and former president of Uganda, Idi Amin, first gained prominence in the West Nile region before staging a military coup and usurping Milton Obote in 1971.

== Energy ==
As of May 2019, West Nile is supplied by the 3.5-megawatt Nyagak Hydroelectric Power Station, located at Nyapea, Zombo District. This is boosted by the newly installed 4.6-megawatt Yumbe Thermal Power Station, operated by Electromaxx. Another 8-megawatt thermal installation is expected in June 2019.

Meantime, construction of the 6.6-megawatt Nyagak III Hydroelectric Power Station is ongoing, with commissioning expected in 2022. With 16 megawatts to the sub-region now, the current power shortage can be mitigated until the national grid connections arrive in the next two to three years. Electromaxx has received authorization to transfer 12.6 megawatts of its installation at Tororo to West Nile, to alleviate the acute power shortage there.

== See also ==
- WENRECO
- West Nile virus
