= Arua =

Arua Ojiodri
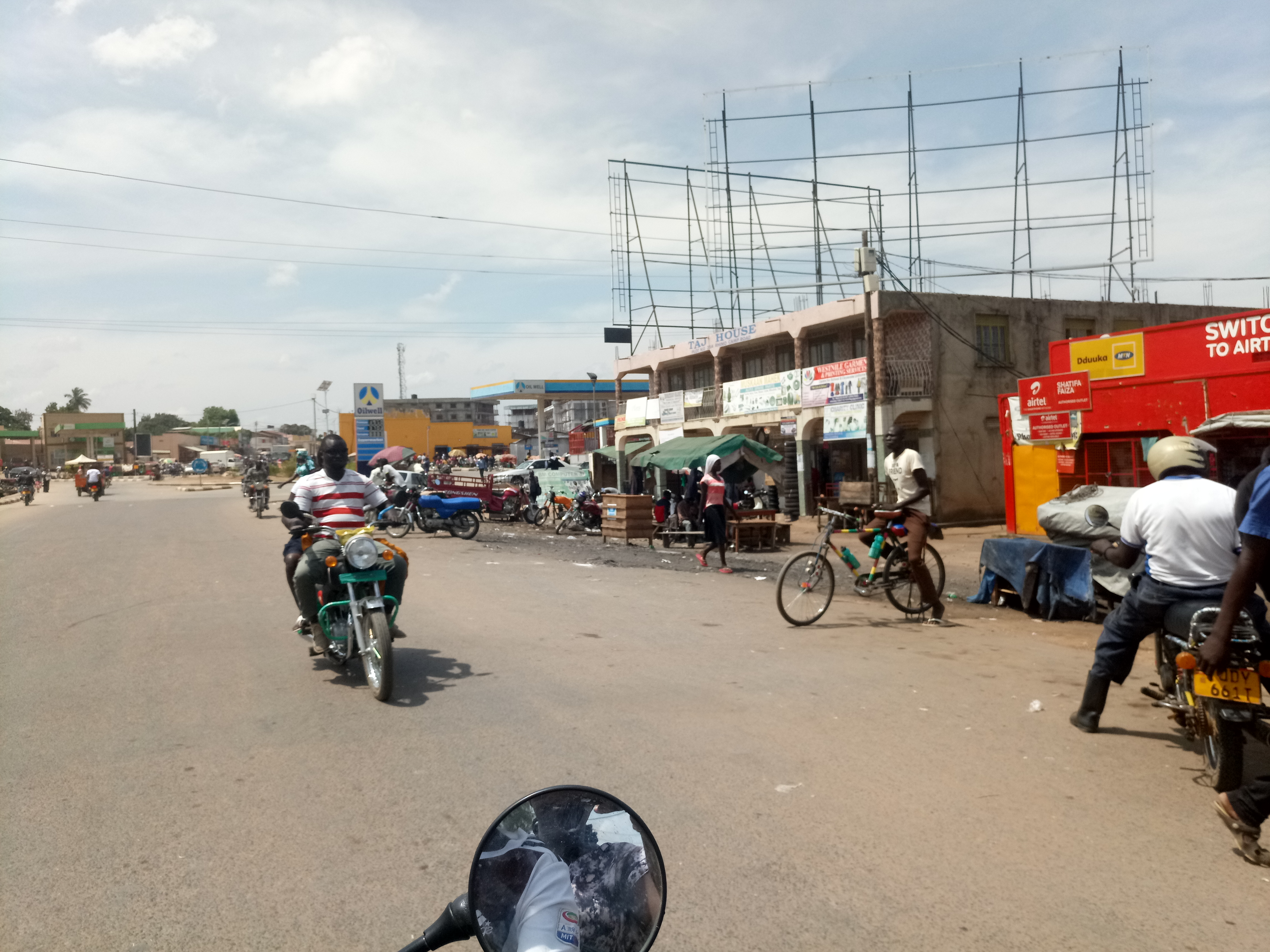
- Main Street in Arua
- Motto: Peace, Justice & Prudence
- Location in Uganda
- Coordinates: 3°02′07″N 30°54′39″E
- Country: Uganda
- Region: Northern Region
- Sub-region: West Nile sub-region
- District: Arua District

Government
  - Mayor: Charles Asiki

Population (2024 Census)
  - Total: 384,656
- Area code: 0476
- Website: www.arua.go.ug

Arua is a city and commercial centre within the Arua District in the Northern Region of Uganda.

== Location ==
Arua is approximately 475 kilometres (295 mi) north-west of Kampala, the capital and largest city of Uganda, Arua is about 228 kilometres (142 mi), by road, west of Gulu, the largest city in Uganda's Northern Region. The geographical coordinates of the city of Arua are 03°02'07.0"N, 30°54'39.0"E (Latitude:3.035278; Longitude:30.910833). Arua sits at an average elevation of 1,310 metres (4,298 ft) above sea level. Arua is closely bordered to the Democratic Republic of Congo in the west and South Sudan in the north, which makes it a strategic location for business between Uganda and her two neighbors to the west and north.

Due to its strategic location, Arua is also part of the refugee program of hosting up to 20% of the refugees entering Uganda annually.

== Overview ==
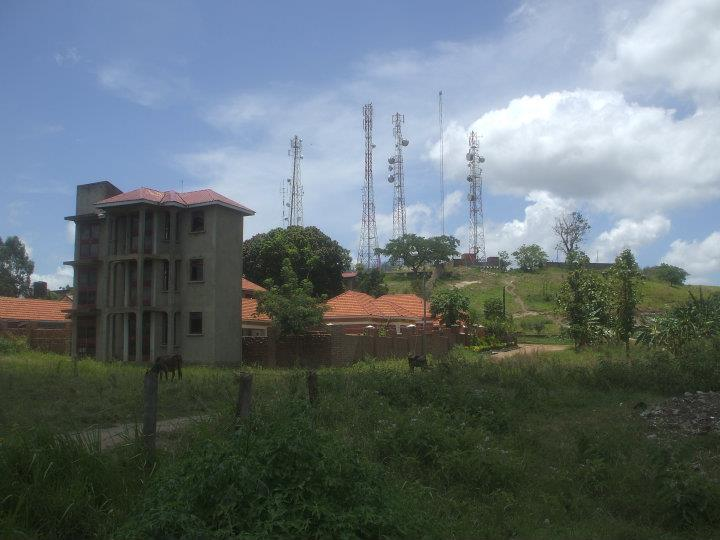
View of Arua Hill

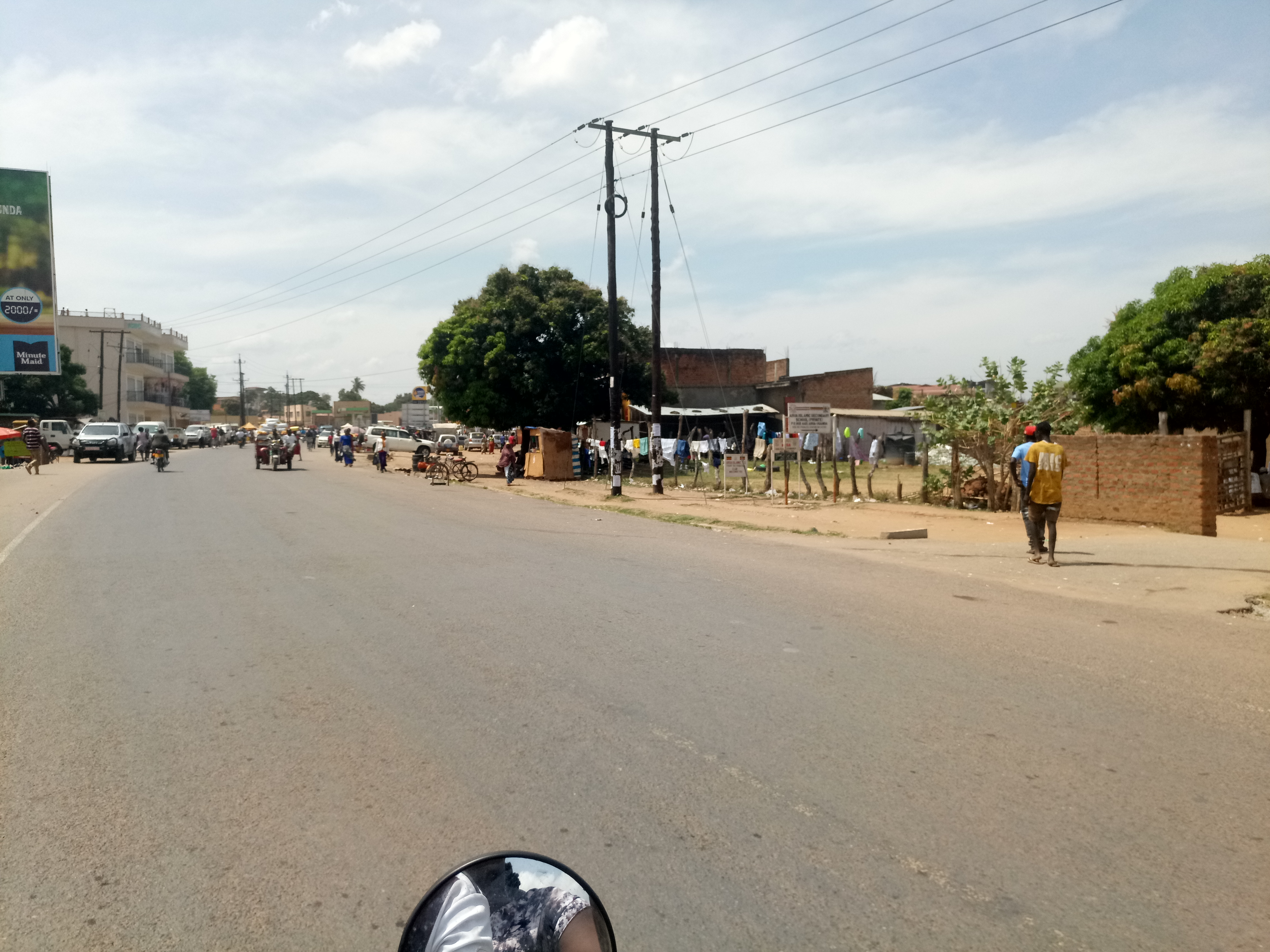
A road in Arua

Arua is an important base for non-governmental organizations working in the West Nile sub-region or serving Western Equatoria in South Sudan and the northeastern Democratic Republic of the Congo. It became an important commercial supply centre and transport route when the Juba - Yei - Morobo - Kaya Road opened, enabling supplies to come into Juba from the south on the Kaya Highway instead of through Khartoum from the north.

== Transport ==
A branch of the Uganda Railways was to be extended to Arua sometime after 1964, but there has been no passenger rail service in Uganda for many years.

The Vurra–Arua–Koboko–Oraba Road passes through town, in a south–north direction. Arua is connected to the other towns in West Nile by road which include: Nebbi, Pakwach, Paidha, Koboko, Yumbe, Moyo, Obongi, Adjumani and other smaller towns. There is regular road transport between Arua and Kampala, Gulu, Masindi and Hoima

The city is served by Arua Airport, which has scheduled air service. Arua airport has been the second busiest in Uganda after Entebbe. It was due to be upgraded to an international airport.

== Population ==
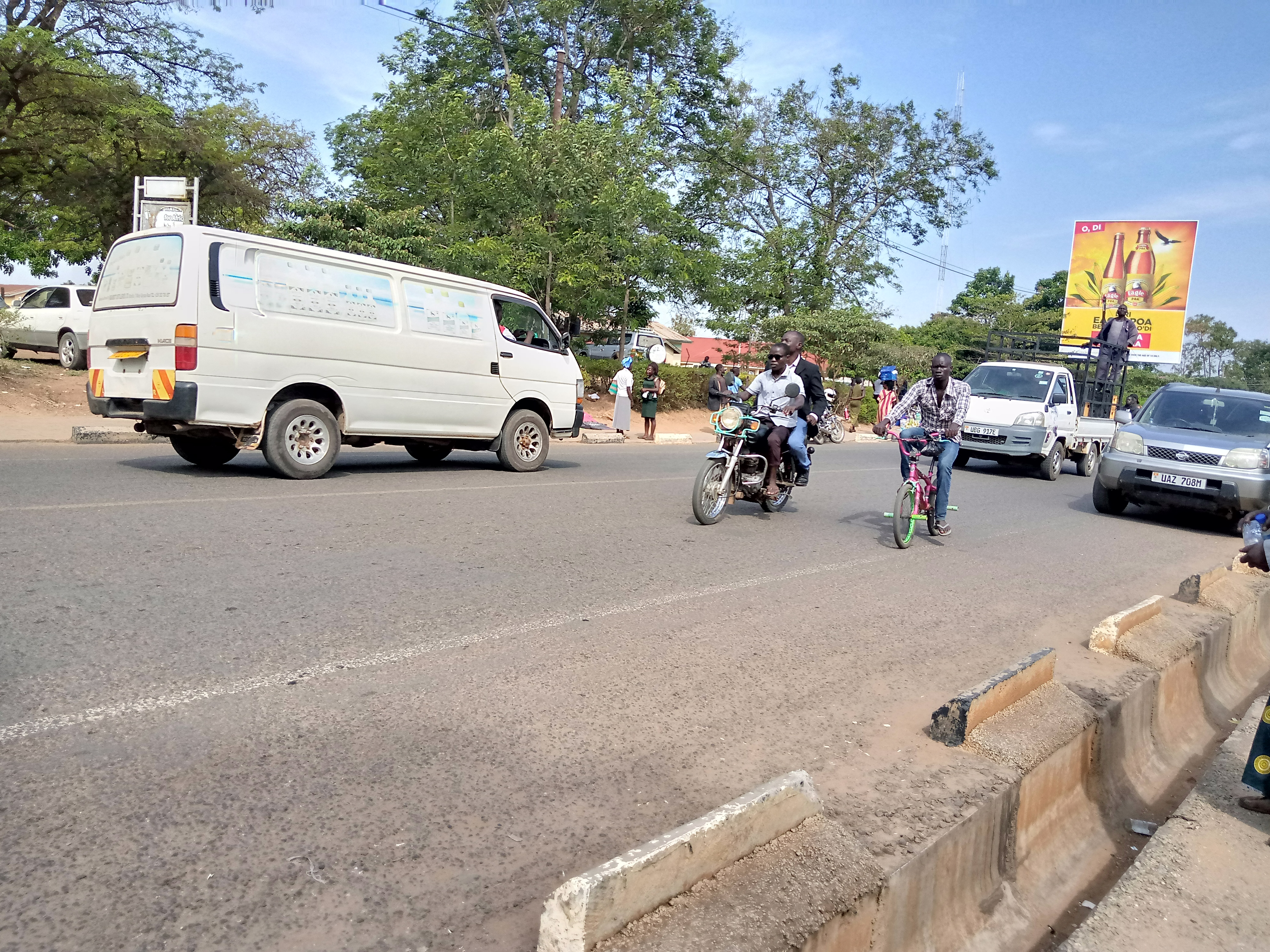
Boda, car and bicycle moving on Arua Main Street

The 1969 national census enumerated the population of Arua Town at 10,837. In 1991, the census enumerated 22,217 people in the town. In 2002, the population had increased to 43,929. The August 2014 national census and household survey enumerated the population of Arua Town Council at 61,962. In 2020, the Uganda Bureau of Statistics (UBOS) estimated the mid-year population to be 72,400. UBOS calculated that the population of Arua Municipality grew at an average rate of 2.7 percent annually, between 2014 and 2020.

Historical population
Year	Pop.	±%
1969	10,837	—
1991	22,217	+105.0%
2002	43,929	+97.7%
2014	61,962	+41.1%
2020	72,400	+16.8%

== Climate ==
Arua has a tropical savanna climate (Köppen climate classification Aw).

Climate data for Arua (1961–1990)
Month	Jan	Feb	Mar	Apr	May	Jun	Jul	Aug	Sep	Oct	Nov	Dec	Year
Record high °C (°F)	34.4 (93.9)	36.1 (97.0)	37.8 (100.0)	35.6 (96.1)	33.3 (91.9)	30.6 (87.1)	30.0 (86.0)	31.1 (88.0)	30.6 (87.1)	32.4 (90.3)	33.3 (91.9)	33.6 (92.5)	37.8 (100.0)
Mean daily maximum °C (°F)	30.5 (86.9)	31.1 (88.0)	30.2 (86.4)	28.8 (83.8)	27.9 (82.2)	27.1 (80.8)	26.1 (79.0)	26.3 (79.3)	27.2 (81.0)	27.9 (82.2)	28.4 (83.1)	29.1 (84.4)	28.4 (83.1)
Mean daily minimum °C (°F)	17.4 (63.3)	18.0 (64.4)	18.3 (64.9)	18.0 (64.4)	17.5 (63.5)	16.9 (62.4)	16.4 (61.5)	16.3 (61.3)	16.5 (61.7)	16.9 (62.4)	17.2 (63.0)	17.0 (62.6)	17.2 (63.0)
Record low °C (°F)	12.8 (55.0)	11.1 (52.0)	13.9 (57.0)	13.9 (57.0)	14.4 (57.9)	13.2 (55.8)	11.7 (53.1)	11.1 (52.0)	12.2 (54.0)	14.1 (57.4)	14.4 (57.9)	12.8 (55.0)	11.1 (52.0)
Average precipitation mm (inches)	17.5 (0.69)	36.6 (1.44)	90.7 (3.57)	120.4 (4.74)	127.6 (5.02)	146.4 (5.76)	154.5 (6.08)	216.9 (8.54)	173.0 (6.81)	209.5 (8.25)	125.1 (4.93)	29.8 (1.17)	1,448 (57.01)
Average precipitation days (≥ 1.0 mm)	1.4	3.0	7.0	9.0	8.7	8.5	11.3	12.6	11.5	13.8	9.7	3.1	99.6
Average relative humidity (%) (at 14:00)	38	36	44	56	60	63	67	66	62	60	53	46	54
Source 1: World Meteorological Organization
Source 2: Deutscher Wetterdienst (extremes and humidity)

== Activities ==
=== Administrative activities ===
The following administrations are seated in Arua:

- Offices of the Arua Town Council
- Headquarters of Arua District
- Headquarters of the Roman Catholic Diocese of Arua and the Church of Uganda's Madi and West Nile Diocese

=== Other business and educational activities ===
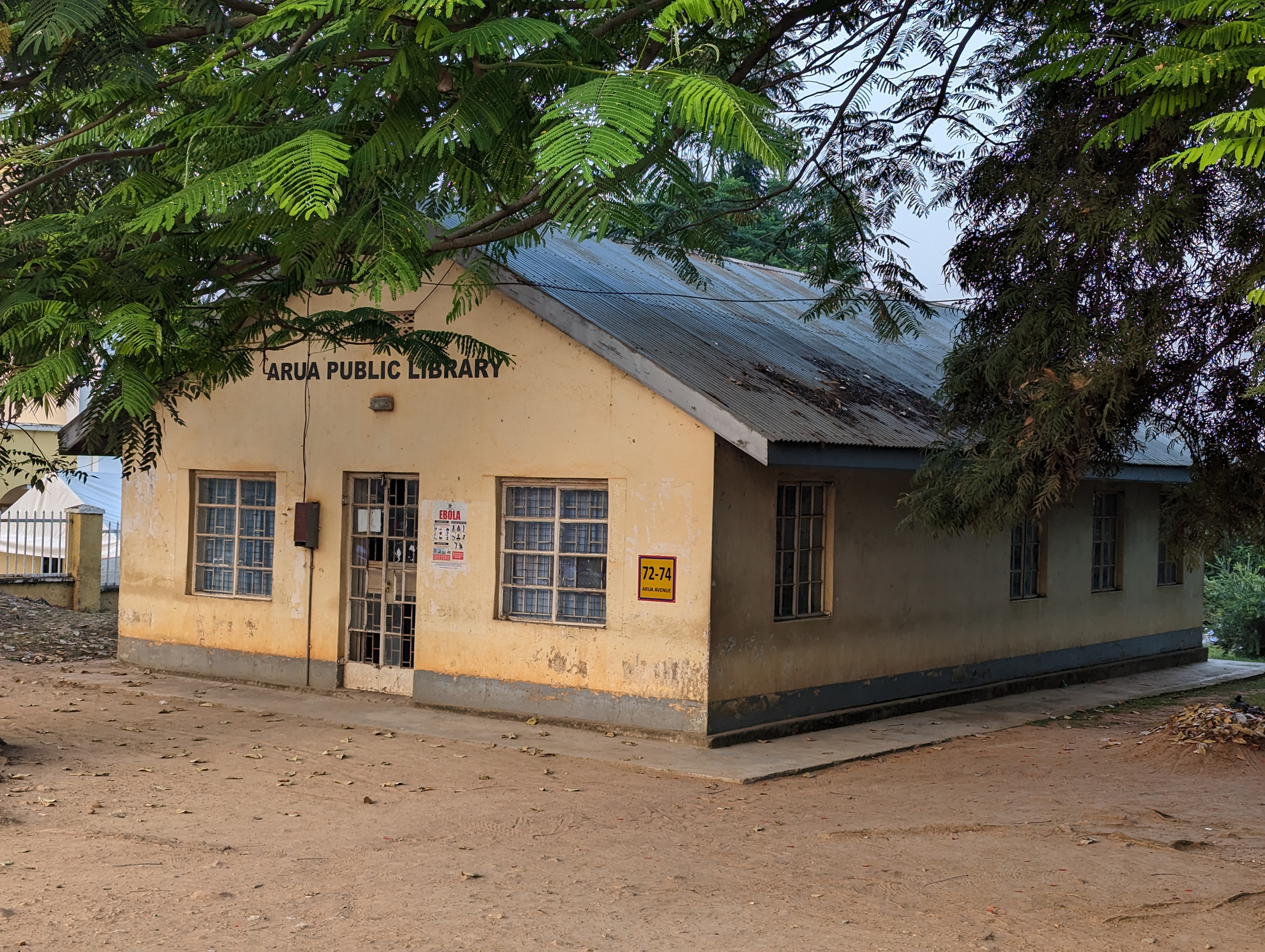
Arua Public Library

- Arua Campus of the Makerere University Business School
- Uganda Christian University Arua Campus in Ringili at St. Paul's Theological College
- Arua Campus of Bugema University
- Muni University, the sixth public university established by the government of Uganda
- Kuluva School of Nursing and Midwifery
- Islamic University in Uganda
- PostBank Uganda
- National Social Security Fund
- Arua Central Market
- Arua Currency Center, a currency storage and processing facility, owned and operated by the Bank of Uganda, Uganda's central bank.
- Arua Hospital, a 128-bed public, regional referral hospital administered by the Uganda Ministry of Health
- Ragem Beach
- United Media Consultants And Trainers(UMCAT) School of Journalism and Mass Communication.

=== Media ===
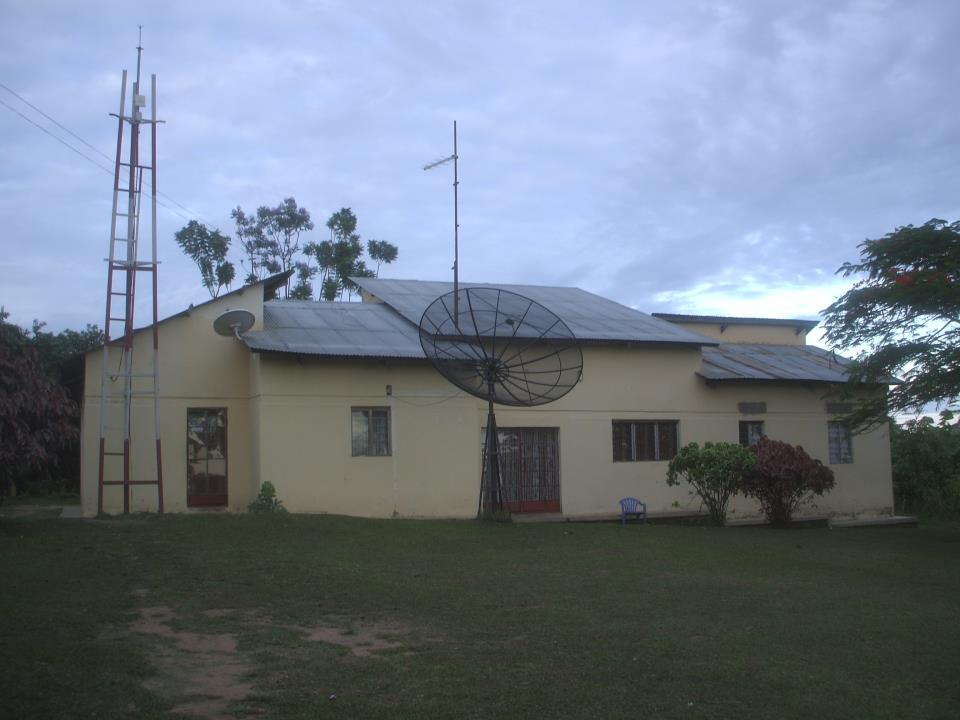
BTN TV and Nile FM studios in Anyafio Village, Arua Hill Division where they began

Free-to-air analog broadcasts, which originated from Kampala, included WBS TV (which is currently closed), UBC TV, and NTV. In early 2014, MBC 2 was aired in Arua as a test broadcast to pave way for Vision Group's Urban TV before the 2015 countrywide digital migration. BTN was the first local TV station since 2003. Westnile TV later emerged as the only functional TV Station on ground in Arua while Host TV, an Online TV Station also pioneered in Arua aiding digital transformation.

Voice of Life 100.9 FM, a Church of Uganda-founded radio station, pioneered FM broadcasting in Arua since 1997. Arua One (88.7 FM), Nile FM (94.1) and Radio Pacis (90.9 plus 94.5 FM) also joined them before others flooded in later including Access (96.3 FM) and Host Radio, an online Web Radio operated by Host Hub Innovations.

== Education ==
There are several Government and private schools in Arua.

According to the district website, there are 437 schools. 105 of these are Nursery schools, 261 are Primary schools, while Secondary schools are 60. The district website also mentions 2 Btvet schools, 3 tertiary schools as well as 3 Teacher College Schools. Some of the schools include St. Joseph's College Ombaci, Muni Girls Secondary School, Arua Secondary School, Arua Primary School, African Ajai Foundation Ltd.

== See also ==
- Arua City Tower
- List of cities and towns in Uganda
- List of radio stations in Uganda
- Lado Enclave
- Railway stations in Uganda
- Uganda
- West Nile sub-region
