= Bidibidi Refugee Settlement =

Bidibidi refugee settlement
- Location within Uganda
- Coordinates: 3.53°N 31.35°E
- Country: Uganda
- District: Yumbe
- Established: 2016

Area
  - Total: 250 km^{2} (97 sq mi)

Bidibidi Refugee Settlement is a refugee camp located in Yumbe District, West Nile sub-Region in Uganda and in the Eastern part of Africa. It is one of the world’s largest refugee settlements in Africa, housing approximately 285,000 refugees fleeing conflict in South Sudan as of late 2016. In 2017, it was characterised as the largest refugee settlement in the world.

Established in August 2016 and closed to new arrivals by December of the same year, Bidibidi spans 250 square kilometers of communal land, primarily consisting of rocky, under-utilized "hunting grounds" deemed unsuitable for agriculture by the host Aringa community. The settlement is organized into five zones( zone 1-zone 5), each divided into clusters and villages formally known as blocks, with a refugee governance structure mirroring Uganda's local councils. The refugee population is predominantly female, with many households led by women, and is ethnically diverse, including Bari speakers from Central Equatoria, Nuer tribe, people from Eastern and Western Equatoria and other smaller groups from other South Sudanese regions. Refugees live alongside host communities and face challenges in returning to their home country in the near future.

In Bidibidi, the primary sources of livelihood are subsistence agriculture and support from humanitarian agencies. The refugee settlement faces severe challenges including inadequate access to clean water, understaffed educational facilities, Food insecurity and a lack of educational materials, compounded by the lack of vocational training opportunities.

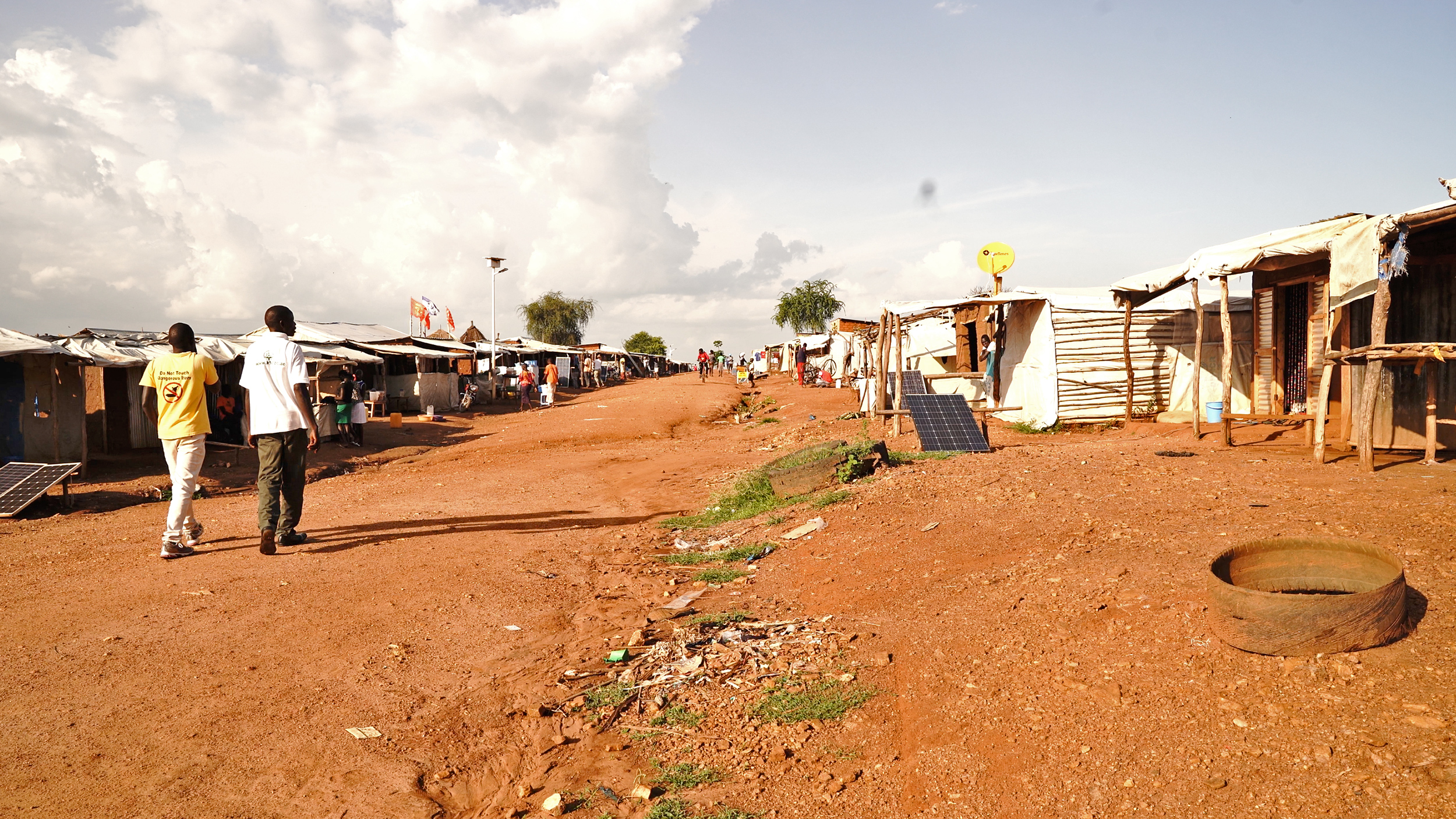
Bidibidi reception centre zone 1

== Geography ==
The Bidibidi area covers 250 square kilometers of the eastern half of Yumbe District, stretching southward from the South Sudanese border and spilling over into Moyo District along the western bank of the Kochi river Bidibidi is largely situated on underutilized "hunting grounds" deemed unsuitable for agriculture by the host community. The terrain features low, rolling hills and predominantly rocky soil. The settlement is interspersed among host community areas and is organized into five zones, each further divided into clusters and individual villages. The five zones are:

- Bidibidi, zone one (1), made up of fourteen (14) villages.
- Swinga, zone two, made up of eleven (11) villages.
- Yoyo, zone three, made up of seventeen (17) villages.
- Abrimajo and Annex, Bolomoni, Kado, zone four.
- Ariwa, zone five.

The Bidibidi area was a small village before becoming a refugee settlement in August 2016. Since then, the Ugandan government and non-governmental organizations have worked to create a settlement rather than a camp to host and contain the influx of the growing number of asylum seekers from South Sudan. It has very quickly become the second-largest refugee camp in the world. Formerly a vast, empty, and arid patch of land nearby the small Ugandan border town of Yumbe, today it is home to some 270,000 refugees, most of whom have fled the violence and upheaval in South Sudan.

== Administration ==
Refugee leadership structures in Bidibidi mirror Uganda’s local governance model, consisting of ascending levels of Local Councils. At the village level, there is a Refugee Welfare Council (RWC) RWC1; at the cluster level, RWC2; and at the zone level, and RWC3. Elections for these councils are supervised by the Office of the Prime Minister (OPM), with each RWC being led by a chairperson. According to the leadership system in Bidibidi Refugee Settlement, leaders are to be changed after two years of their reign.

The United Nations High Commissioner for Refugees (UNHCR) and the Ugandan government ensure the provision of essential services, including health care, protection and education for refugees.

== Demographics ==
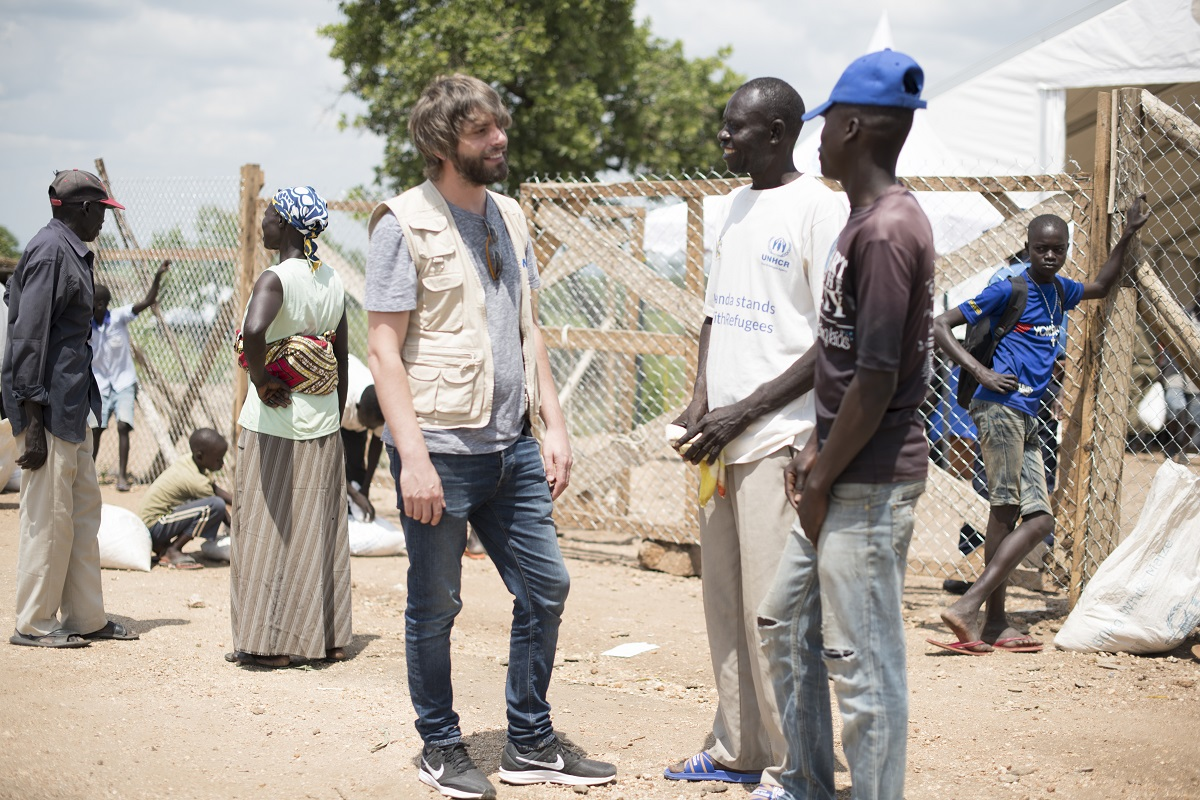
Benson Taylor speaking with South Sudanese refugees at Bidibidi

Bidibidi was opened in August or September of 2016 and was closed to new arrivals by December of the same year after reaching maximum capacity. With an estimated population of 285,000 refugees, it was recognized in 2017 as the largest refugee settlement in the world. The host community consists of the Aringa, the indigenous people of Yumbe District.

A June 2018 UNHCR report detailed the following population distribution: 26,650 females and 25,082 males aged 0–4; 45,689 females and 47,040 males aged 5–11; 26,323 females and 28,314 males aged 12–17; 48,766 females and 33,079 males aged 18–59; and 4,757 females and 2,159 males aged 60 and over.

In Bidibidi, the population is predominantly female, with women outnumbering men by a 3:2 ratio, and most households are led by women. The majority of the settlement's residents are under the age of 18.

The majority of refugees are ethnically diverse Bari speakers from Central Equatoria, including groups such as the Bari, Mundari, Kuku, Kakwa, Pojulu, and Nyagwara. There are also refugees from other parts of Equatoria, notably Eastern Equatoria, such as the Ma’di, Otuho, Lokoya, Peri, Didinga, Lulubo, Lopit, Dongotona, and Acholi, as well as smaller communities from other South Sudanese regions, including the Nuer, Shilluk, Azande, Keliko, Murle, and Dinka. Most of these non-Equatorial refugees were residing in Equatoria, particularly Juba, when the conflict intensified in 2016.

As of June 2025, Bidibidi still hosted more than 270,000 refugees.

== Economy ==
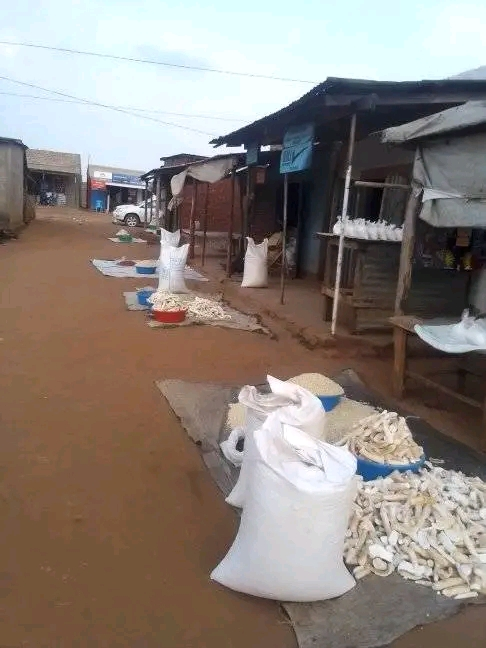
Bidibidi main market in zone 1

In the Bidibidi, the primary sources of livelihood are subsistence agriculture and support from UNHCR and the World Food Programme, which are essential for their survival and well-being. Both refugees and nationals face significant challenges in accessing livelihood opportunities. Refugees particularly struggle with insufficient and costly agricultural land, poor soil quality, and a lack of suitable seeds for the climate. Nationals also face difficulties accessing livelihood training, which limits their employment prospects. Upon arrival at the settlement, refugees receive non-food items (NFIs) such as saucepans, solar lamps, mattresses, and jerry cans, but these have not been replaced and are largely worn out or broken. This scarcity forces refugees to share resources and take turns cooking, diminishing their living standards.

In the Bidibidi refugee settlement, some refugees engage in farming by using land either rented from host communities or allocated by the UNHCR. Humanitarian organizations such as Seed Effect Uganda, Afford, Caritas Uganda, and DanChurchAid provide seeds for crops like cassava, beans, millet, maize, potatoes, and sweet potatoes. Both refugees and host communities receive these seeds, with distributions carried out by entities like the Uganda Red Cross Society.

== Education ==
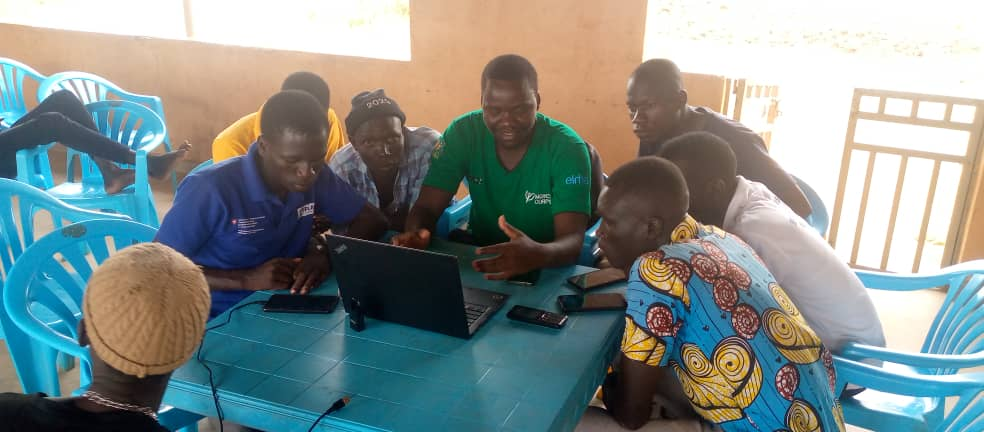
Zone 4 youth participating in Wikimedia training

In Bidibidi, the majority of the schools were being built using capets before rebuilding with bricks as the settlement's transitions into a permanent city. In April 2019, it was reported that the camp featured five secondary schools in all the five zones of bidibidi with structures primarily temporary and facing challenges like deteriorating facilities and shortages of essential resources. As the area develops, these schools are intended to serve not only the refugee population but also the surrounding Ugandan communities.

Access to quality education is limited for both refugees and the host community due to the shortage of schools, classrooms, and teachers, resulting in low performance of students in exams and practical knowledge. teacher-to-student ratios and a poor learning environment. The situation is worsened by inadequate school materials and lack of teacher training. The absence of vocational training institutions further restricted opportunities for students who cannot pursue secondary or tertiary education, significantly impacting their future livelihood prospects. Yangani Primary School, for example, served around 5,000 students in 2017, despite having a staff of only 38 teachers. The school was reported to face severe overcrowding, with some classrooms holding up to five students per desk, while others standd or sit on the floor due to a lack of space. The school had only 279 textbooks, meaning that on average, one textbook was shared among 18 students. Several NGOs, most notably Windle International Uganda, Plan International, and UNICEF, have worked to improve educational opportunities for refugees in Bidibidi.

=== Schools in zone one ===
- Twajiji Primary School
- Rockland Primary School
- Valley View Secondary School
- Alpha Primary School
- Ariju primary school
- Ofonje primary school
- Twajiji Hope primary school

=== Schools in zone two ===
- Highland Secondary School
- Kijebere Primary School
- Alaba Primary School
- Molondo primary.
- Kena valley primary school
- Koro primary school

=== Schools in zone five ===
- Okubani primary school
- Ariwa primary school
- Ayivua primary school
- Ariwa secondary school
- Ombeci primary school
- Okuyo primary school
- Yangani primary school
- Yangani secondary school

== Health care and sanitation ==
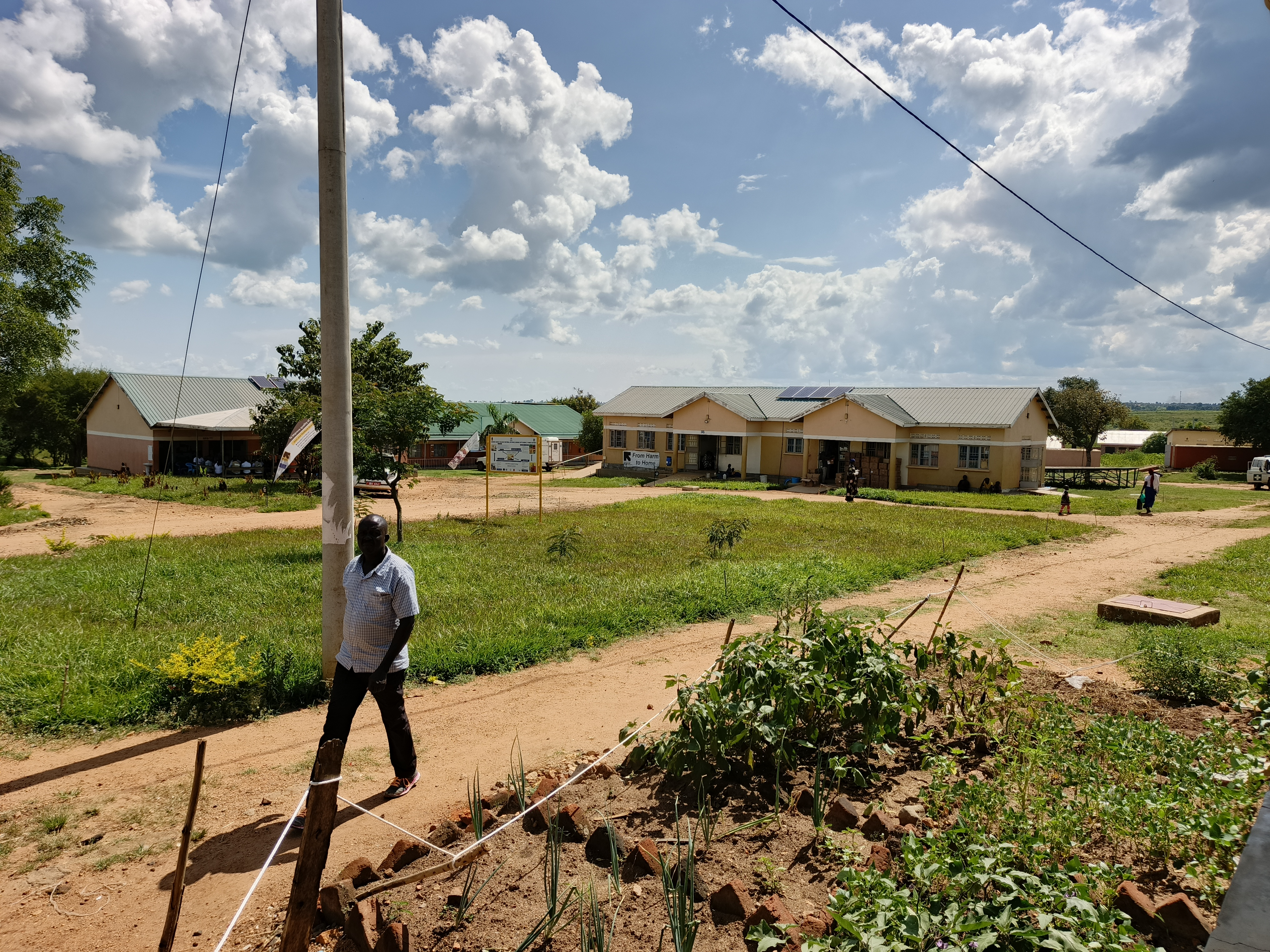
Bidibidi health center

In June 2018, clean water sources were scarce, with refugees facing long distances, extended wait times, and high congestion at the few available points. The existing boreholes were of poor quality, with repair delays exacerbating the problem. The limited water supply, worsened by the dry season, forced both refugees and nationals to use unprotected sources. Inadequate latrine coverage led to increased open defecation, further compromising hygiene and sanitation in the settlement.

=== Pollution ===
A 2019 environmental scoping report found that waste management in Bidibidi was largely handled at household level, as there were no institutional recycling facilities in the settlement or elsewhere in northern Uganda for common materials such as plastic and glass. Household waste was commonly burned in pits close to homes, sometimes including plastics. The report noted that burning plastics could cause short-term health effects such as headaches, nausea and rashes, and could increase the risk of respiratory and other serious illnesses, including damage to the immune and reproductive systems and certain cancers. Rain and wind could also spread contaminants into the surrounding environment and onto crops.

The report also identified the handling of used batteries as a particular concern. Some residents cut open batteries and mixed their contents with water to smooth household floors, while others disposed of batteries in latrine pits. Participants reported coughing when breaking batteries open, and the report warned that the toxic chemicals they contain pose risks to human health and the environment.

Wastewater management was also minimal, with household greywater commonly discarded into bushes or rubbish pits rather than treated or reused. However, the report found that Bidibidi generally did not experience severe water contamination.

== Crime and safety ==
In June 2018, Child protection was a significant concern, with child-headed households lacking adequate services and young girls facing risks of sexual violence while collecting firewood from the host community. Theft of food items at night was another reported issue.

Inter-communal tensions among refugees, driven by competition for limited resources and cultural misunderstandings, often manifested as tribal conflicts, such as between the Dinka and Nuer or Kakwa and Pojulu. These disputes were exacerbated by suspicions of arms smuggling and a rise in opportunistic crime.

== Culture and media ==
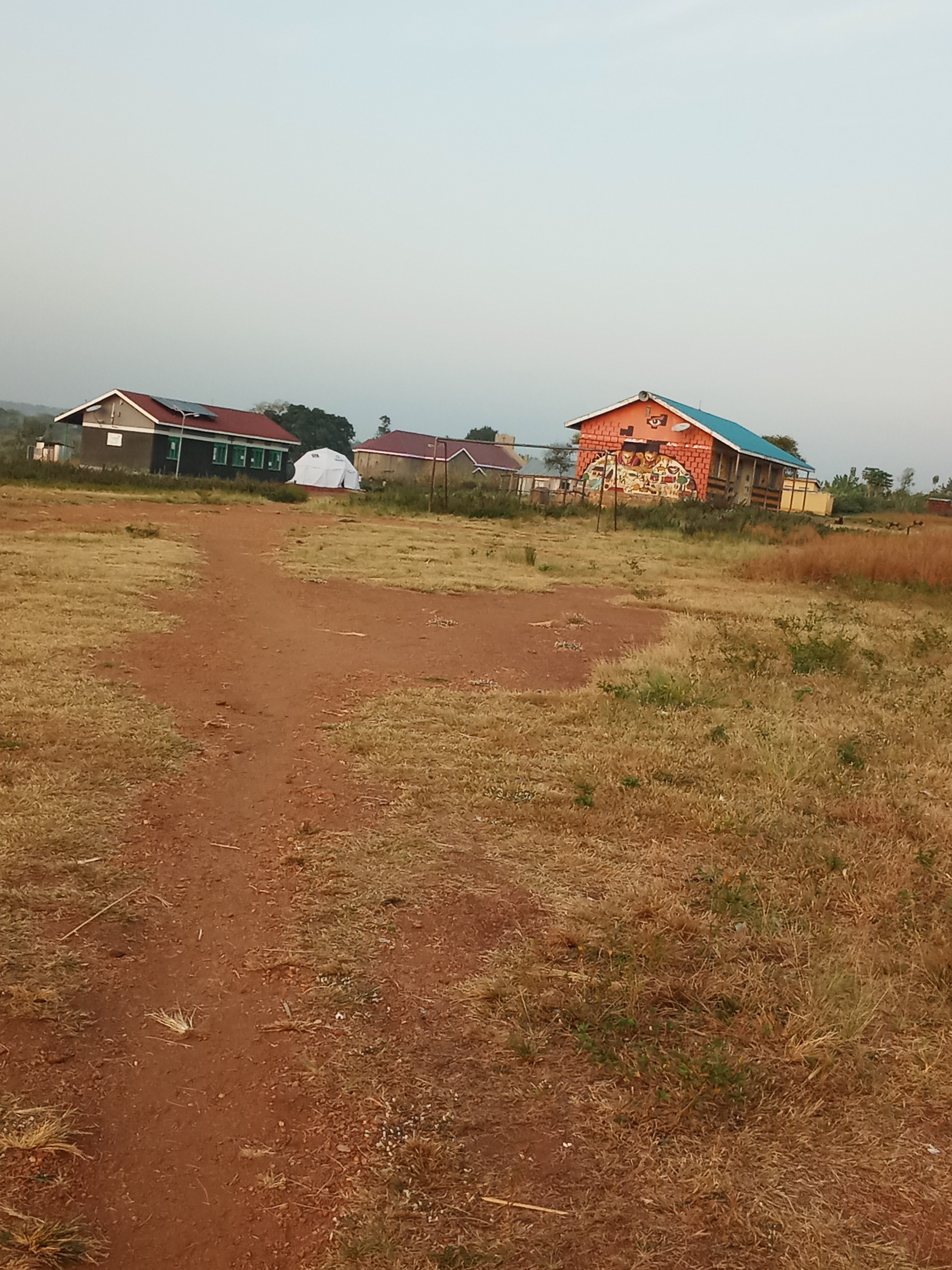
Youth centers in zone 1

Bidibidi FM is a community radio station based in the Bidibidi Refugee Settlement. Established by the United Nations High Commissioner for Refugees in collaboration with DW Akademie, REF FM Foundation, and the Straight Talk Foundation, it provides vital information and a platform for refugees to share their voices and experiences and is the primary source of information for many residents.

The Bidibidi Performing Arts Centre, designed by Hassell and Local works in collaboration with To.org, serves the community. Constructed from locally sourced earth bricks, the amphitheater-like facility includes a stage and a recording studio, and features a roof designed to collect rainwater for community use.

=== Churches in Bidibidi ===
- St. Paul Ariye
- St. Andrew
- Immanuel Church
- Seneta Church
- Immaculate heart of Mary Eucharistic Center
- St.Francis of Asisi
- St.Mary
- St.Joseph

== Sports ==
Bidibidi generally involves in different sports activities like football, netball, athletics, volleyball and basketball are among the main sports played in Bidibidi, mainly in primary and secondary schools.

== See also ==
- List of Refugee settlements in Uganda
