= Lodonga =

Ugandan town

- Location in Uganda
- Coordinates: 03°24′59″N 31°06′59″E
- Country: Uganda
- Region: Northern Region of Uganda
- Sub-region: West Nile sub-region
- District: Yumbe District

Population (2024 Census)
  - Total: 29,357

Lodonga is a town in the Northern Region of Uganda. It is one of the municipalities in Yumbe District.

== Location ==
Lodong is located along the Koboko–Yumbe–Moyo Road, approximately, 17 kilometres (11 mi), by road, west of Yumbe Town, where the district headquarters are located. This is approximately 75 kilometres (47 mi), north-east of Arua, the largest city in the West Nile sub-region. The geographical coordinates of Lodonga are 3°24'59.0"N, 31°06'59.0"E (Latitude:3.416389; Longitude:31.116389).

== Points of interest ==
The following points of interest lie within the town or near the town limits: (a) the Koboko–Yumbe–Moyo Road passes through the middle of town in a general south-west to north-east direction. (b) the Basilica of the Blessed Virgin Mary, Lodonga is located in the northern part of the town.

== See also ==
- West Nile sub-region
- List of cities and towns in Uganda
