= Kulikulinga Town Council =

Kulikulinga
- Town Council
- Location within Uganda
- Coordinates: 3°20′44.3″N 31°15′01.9″E
- County: Uganda
- Region: West Nile
- District: Yumbe
- County: Aringa County
- Sub-accounty: Odravu West

Kulikulinga is a newly created town council in Yumbe District

It's located on 3°20′44.3″N 31°15′01.9″E along the Yumbe Obongi Arua road south of Yumbe Municipality which is larger town in the District.

== Road Network ==
Kulikulinga is located along Yumbe arua road where the Obongi road joins it to continue to Arua.
