= West Nile rebellion =

West Nile rebellion may refer to:

- Fighting in northwestern Uganda during the Ugandan Bush War
- Insurgencies of the UNRF II and West Nile Bank Front
