= OYG =

OYG may refer to:

- O.Y.G Redrum 781, an American rapper
- IATA code OYG, which is assigned to Moyo Airport
- Osaka Yuhigaoka Gakuen Junior College, commonly shortened as oyg
