= Basilica of the Blessed Virgin Mary, Lodonga =

1961 building in Lodonga, Uganda

Basilica of the Blessed Virgin Mary

Religion
- Affiliation: Roman Catholic
- Diocese: Roman Catholic Diocese of Arua
- Ecclesiastical or organisational status: Minor basilica
- Year consecrated: 26 May 1961

Location
- Location: Lodonga, Yumbe District, Uganda
- Interactive map of Basilica of the Blessed Virgin Mary
- Coordinates: 03°25′16″N 31°06′50″E

Architecture
- Completed: 1961

The Basilica of the Blessed Virgin Mary (Basilique Notre-Dame d’Afrique) is a Roman Catholic minor basilica dedicated to the Blessed Virgin Mary located in Lodonga, Uganda. The basilica is under the circumscription of the Diocese of Arua. The basilica was dedicated on May 26, 1961.

== Location ==
Lodonga is located in Yumbe District, approximately, 17 kilometres (11 mi), by road, west of Yumbe Town, where the district headquarters are located. This is approximately 75 kilometres (47 mi), north-east of Arua, the largest city in the West Nile sub-region. The geographical coordinates of the basilica are 3°25'16.0"N, 31°06'50.0"E (Latitude:3.421111; Longitude:31.113889).

== Overview ==
Construction of the basilica was initiated by Reverend Father Pietro Valcavi, a Comboni Missionary during the 1950s. He worked closely with Father Bernardo Sartori, Reverend Father Toni La Salandra, Brother Arosio, with the blessing of Monseigneur Angelo Negri.

The basilica was damaged during the war that removed Idi Amin from power in 1979. Repairs were don to repair and restore the cathedral, beginning in 1990, supervised by Brother Udeschini Giuseppe and Father Toni.

== See also ==
- Basilica of the Uganda Martyrs
- Munyonyo Martyrs' Shrine
