= Yumbe General Hospital =

Hospital in Yumbe, Uganda

Yumbe Regional Referral Hospital
- Uganda Ministry of Health
- Location within Uganda

Geography
- Location: Yumbe, Yumbe District, Northern Region, Uganda
- Coordinates: 03°27′56″N 31°14′35″E

Organisation
- Care system: Public
- Type: Regional Referral

Services
- Emergency department: I
- Beds: 100

History
- Founded: 1960s

Links
- Other links: Hospitals in Uganda

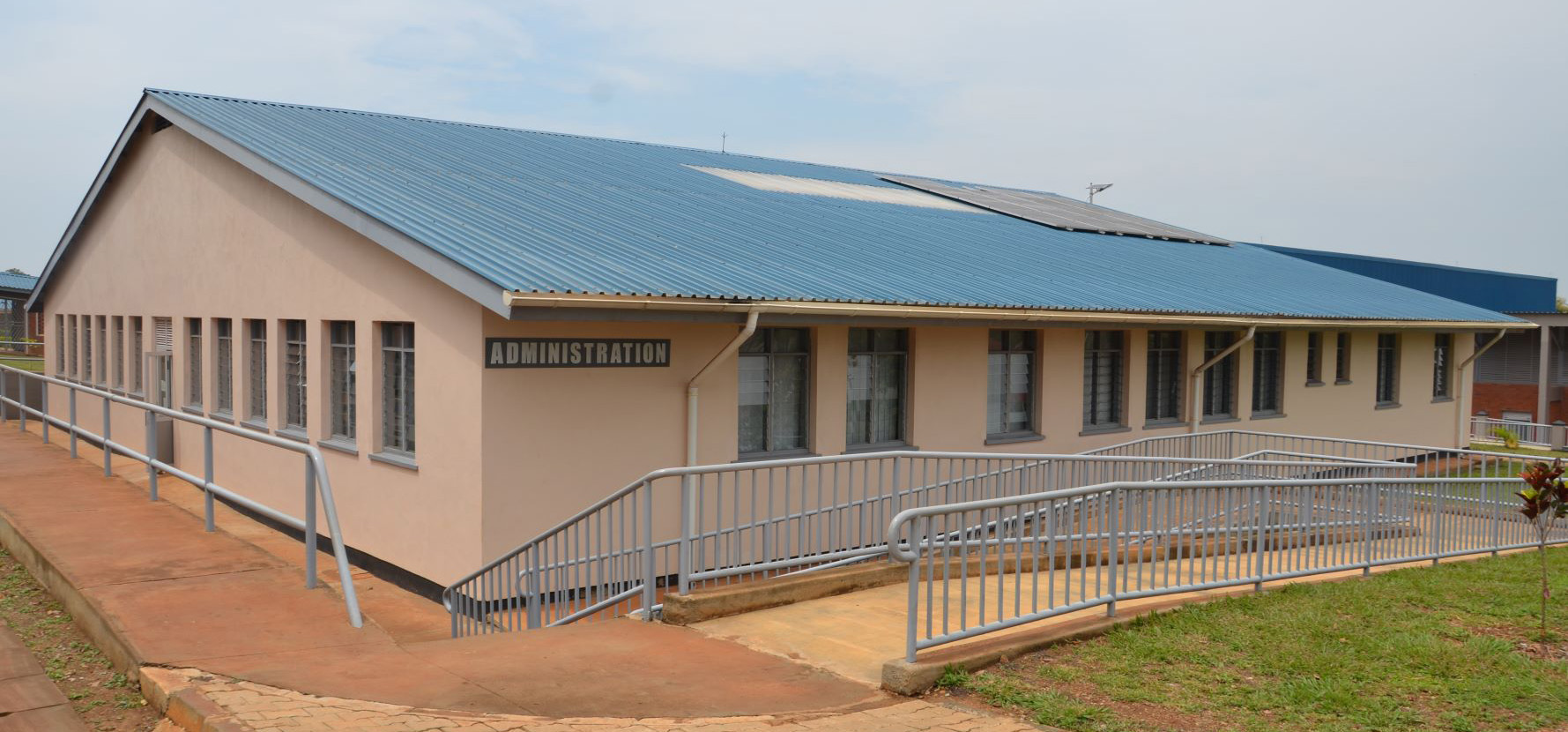
Yumbe Hospital Admin Block.jpg

Yumbe Hospital, is a hospital in the West Nile sub-region of the Northern Region of Uganda.

== Location ==
The hospital is located in the town of Yumbe, the political and commercial capital of Yumbe District, approximately 91 kilometres (57 mi), north-east of the town of Arua, the largest city in West Nile sub-region. The geographical coordinates of Yumbe General Hospital are: 03°27'56.0"N, 31°14'35.0"E (Latitude:3.465556; Longitude:31.243056).

== Overview ==
Yumbe Hospital is a 100-bed public hospital. It serves Yumbe District and parts of the neighboring districts of Moyo, Koboko, Maracha, and Arua. The hospital was constructed in the 1960s and did not get a face lift or renovation for the next 50 years.

Beginning in January 2018, the government of Uganda, using funds borrowed from the (a) Saudi Fund for Development, (b) Arab Bank for Economic Development in Africa (BADEA) and (c) OPEC Fund for International Development (OFID), contracted Sadeem Al-Kuwait General Trading & Contracting Company, to renovate, rehabilitate and expand the hospital. The renovations, expected to cost approximately US$18,500,000 (approx. USh69 billion), are expected to last 24 months.

The upgrade includes the expansion of the Emergency Room, Outpatient Department, Maternity Unit and Postnatal Ward. The work includes physical infrastructure, equipment and furniture. As part of the renovation, an ambulance, a double-cabin pick-up truck and a mini-bus will be procured, to facilitate patient transfer and improve general hospital management and hospital outreach.

The contract also calls for the rehabilitation of old staff quarters and the construction of new staff houses.

== See also ==
- List of hospitals in Uganda
