= Midigo =

- Sub-County
- Location within Uganda
- Coordinates: 3°36′38″N 31°14′38″E
- Country: Uganda
- Region: Northern Uganda
- District: Yumbe District
- County: Aringa North

Midigo is located in Yumbe District of West Nile Region Northern Uganda. It is one of the Sub-Counties of Aringa North County in Yumbe District

== Geographical location ==
Midigo is located on 3°36′38″N 31°14′38″E and 18 Km by road North of Yumbe Town which is the largest and the District Headquarters. It is located near the Uganda Boarder with South Sudan.

== Social Services ==
=== Health ===
1. Midigo Health Center IV

=== Education ===
Midigo has a number of schools located in the Sub-County both private and Government Aided

1. Midigo Calvary Nursery and Primary school
