= BidiBidi Arts Centre =

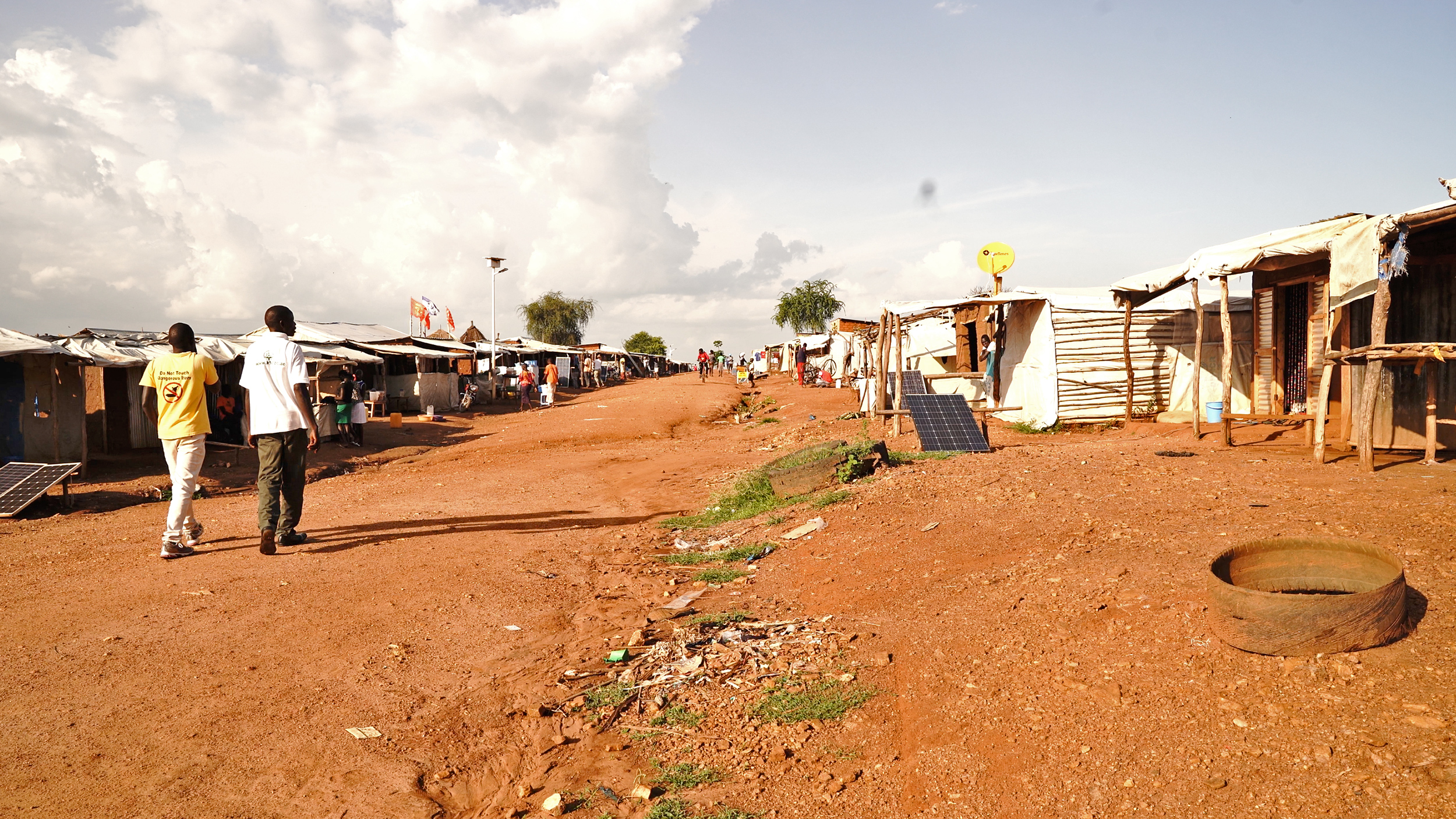
Bidi Bidi refugee camp settlement

The Bidibidi Arts Centre, officially known as the Bidibidi Performing Arts Centre, is a performing arts and community centre located in the Bidibidi Refugee Settlement in Yumbe District, northern Uganda. Serving both refugees and the local Ugandan community, it provides spaces for performing arts, education, creative healing, and social interaction. The centre was opened in December 2023 and is recognized as a pioneering model for arts infrastructure in humanitarian settings

== History ==
Bidibidi Refugee Settlement was opened in 2016 to accommodate refugees fleeing conflict in South Sudan and now houses over 250,000 residents, making it one of the world's largest refugee settlements. The concept for a dedicated arts space originated with To.org, a philanthropic and creative platform, after a 2018 assessment highlighted the local demand for spaces supporting cultural expression and community healing. The project was guided by extensive community consultation and partnership with SINA Loketa and further developed in collaboration with the architecture studios Hassell and LocalWorks, as well as the engineering firm Arup. The design and construction process involved the local workforce and prioritized participatory design, inclusivity, and sustainability. The centre's opening in December 2023 featured performances by refugee and local artists, symbolizing the facility's role in bridging cultures and fostering resilience

== Architecture ==
The Bidibidi Arts Centre is set within an elliptical, amphitheatre-like building. The facility features a semi-open-air amphitheatre, classrooms for music and arts education, dedicated spaces for workshops, and a professional recording studio. Walls are constructed from compressed earth bricks produced from local soil at the site, reflecting traditional architectural practices of the region. The prefabricated steel roof, shaped as a funnel, is designed for rainwater harvesting and is elevated on steel columns to ensure ventilation and shade. The structure's layout incorporates two spatial centers: one serving as the performance area and another for natural daylight and water collection. Earth brick latticework in the walls optimizes light and airflow while enhancing the building's acoustics. The venue's flexible design means the stage can be oriented to address audiences either inside or outdoors, as the back wall of the amphitheatre can open fully to accommodate larger gatherings. A 200,000-litre water tank, filled from the rooftop catchment system, supports a tree nursery, vegetable gardens, and community irrigation infrastructure

== Impact and recognition ==
The centre's programming, developed with organizations such as the Playing for Change Foundation and The MVMT, as well as grassroots leaders, includes music and dance classes, workshops focusing on mental health, trauma healing, and conflict resolution, and large-scale cultural events.
