= Afoji =

- Location on the South Sudan–Uganda border Placement on map is approximate
- Coordinates: 03°42′13″N 31°40′36″E
- Country: Uganda
- Region: Northern Region of Uganda
- Sub-region: West Nile sub-region
- District: Moyo District
- Elevation: 1,200 m (3,900 ft)
  - Density: 3/km^{2} (7.8/sq mi)

Afoji is a town in Moyo District, in the Northern Region of Uganda.

== Location ==
Afoji is located at the border with South Sudan, approximately 9 kilometres (6 mi), by road, northwest of the central business district of Moyo Town. This lies approximately 165 kilometres (103 mi) northeast of Arua, the largest urban centre in West Nile sub-region. This is about 496 kilometres (308 mi), by road, northwest of Kampala, Uganda's capital and largest city. The geographical coordinates of Afoji are 03°42'13.0"N, 31°40'36.0"E (Latitude:3.703609; Longitude:31.676658).

== Overview ==
The Atiak–Adjumani–Moyo–Afoji Road, facilitates trade and the movement of people between Uganda and South Sudan.
