= Koboko–Yumbe–Moyo Road =

Ugandan road

Coordinates: 03°28′43″N 31°15′54″E

Route information
- Length: 65 mi (105 km)
- History: Designation 2024; Expected completion in 2027

Major junctions
- Southwest end: Koboko
- Yumbe
- Northeast end: Moyo

Location
- Country: Uganda

Highway system
- Roads in Uganda

The Koboko–Yumbe–Moyo Road is a road in the Northern Region of Uganda, connecting the towns of Koboko, Yumbe, and Moyo.

== Location ==
The road starts at Koboko, the headquarters of the Koboko District, and continues in a northeasterly direction, through Yumbe, where the headquarters of the Yumbe District are located, ending at Moyo, where the headquarters of the Moyo District are located. The road is approximately 105 kilometres (65 mi) from end to end.

== Overview ==
The road is a busy and important road for people and goods traveling between the town of Moyo and points south. The road corridor is the lifeline for the host and the refugee population of the districts of Moyo, Yumbe and Koboko. Uganda is host to 1.4 million refugees, the largest number on the African continent and the largest in the World. This road passes in close proximity to Bidibidi Refugee Camp, the most populous refugee settlement in Africa, Lobule Refugee Camp, and Palorinya Refugee Settlement. Those locations are home to over 360,000 refugees.

== Upgrading to bitumen ==
During the 2016 political electoral season, President Yoweri Museveni promised to tarmac this gravel surfaced road, which is in disrepair.

== Funding ==
In September 2020, the World Bank approved a grant of US$130.8 million from the International Development Association (IDA) to tarmac the road. Part of the justification for the grant, is the estimated 800,000 refugees hosted by the districts in the Northern Region of Uganda, especially in the West Nile sub-region. The majority of these refugees come from South Sudan and the Democratic Republic of the Congo.

== Construction ==
Construction is expected to start in 2021, after a contractor is selected and hired. The engineering, procurement and construction (EPC) contract was awarded to Zhongmei Engineering Group Limited. Construction began in Q3 2024 and is expected to conclude in 2027.

== See also ==
- List of roads in Uganda
- Transport in Uganda
- Atiak–Adjumani–Moyo–Afoji Road
