= Operation Thunderbolt (1997) =

SPLA-led offensive against the Sudanese government

- Part of the Second Sudanese Civil War and the First Congo War
- Map of Operation Thunderbolt
Date	9 March – late April 1997
Location	Western and Central Equatoria, Sudan
Result	SPLA victory
Territorial changes	Most of Western and Central Equatoria is captured by the SPLA

Belligerents
Sudan; WNBF; UNRF (II); Zaire; SSIM/A; (Rwanda) Ex-FAR; LRA/LSA	SPLA; Uganda; Ethiopia; Eritrea

Commanders and leaders
Unidentified major general; Juma Oris (WIA) (WNBF); Abdulatif Tiyua (POW) (WNBF); (Rwanda) Jean-Marie Magabo (POW) (Ex-FAR); Joseph Kony (LRA/LSA)	Salva Kiir; James Hoth Mai; Yoweri Museveni; Salim Saleh; Katumba Wamala; James Kazini; (Ethiopia) Unidentified Ethiopian commanders

Units involved
SAF; Equatoria garrisons; FAZ remnants	SPLA-Torit; UPDF; 23rd Battalion; (Ethiopia) Ethiopian Army; Eritrean Army

Strength
Thousands	~12,000

Casualties and losses
Sudan: thousands killed or wounded; thousands captured WNBF: at least 800 killed, 1,000 captured UNRF (II): Heavy	Unknown
- Many civilians displaced

Operation Thunderbolt (9 March – late April 1997) was the codename for a military offensive by the South Sudanese SPLA rebel group and its allies during the Second Sudanese Civil War. The operation aimed at conquering several towns in Western and Central Equatoria, most importantly Yei, which served as strongholds for the Sudanese Armed Forces (SAF) and helped the Sudanese government to supply its allies, the Ugandan insurgents of the WNBF and UNRF (II) based in Zaire. These pro-Sudanese forces were defeated and driven from Zaire by the SPLA and its allies, namely Uganda and the AFDL, in the course of the First Congo War, thus allowing the SPLA to launch Operation Thunderbolt from the Zairian side of the border. Covertly supported by expeditionary forces from Uganda, Ethiopia, and Eritrea, the SPLA's offensive was a major success, with several SAF garrison towns falling to the South Sudanese rebels in a matter of days. Yei was encircled and put under siege on 11 March 1997. At the same time, a large group of WNBF fighters as well as SAF, FAZ, and ex-Rwandan Armed Forces soldiers was trying to escape from Zaire to Yei. The column was ambushed and destroyed by the SPLA, allowing it to capture Yei shortly afterward. Following this victory, the South Sudanese rebels continued their offensive until late April, capturing several other towns in Equatoria and preparing further anti-government campaigns.

The success of Operation Thunderbolt significantly strengthened the SPLA in Western Equatoria, and weakened the Sudanese government's control over its southern territories. The South Sudanese rebels were thus able to expand their operations, and raised global awareness for their cause. Furthermore, the WNBF and UNRF (II) suffered heavy losses during the offensive. Taken together with their defeats in the First Congo War, they were permanently weakened, and in case of the WNBF, effectively defeated as active fighting forces.

== Background ==
=== Civil war in Sudan ===
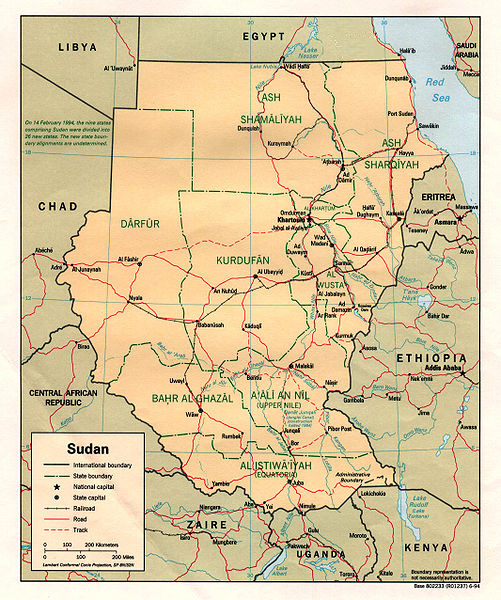
Sudan in 1994

Following its independence in 1956, Sudan had suffered from numerous internal conflicts over political, ethnic, and religious issues. In 1983, revolutionaries and separatists from the country's mostly Christian-Animistic south banded together and launched an insurgency against the government which was traditionally dominated by Muslim elites from the north. The rebels organized themselves as the "Sudan People's Liberation Army" (SPLA) under the leadership of John Garang, and the insurgency eventually escalated into a full civil war that also affected Sudan's east and west. Negotiations between the government and the SPLA almost resulted in a peaceful solution of the conflict, but ended after the 1989 coup d'état which brought the National Islamic Front (NIF) under Omar al-Bashir to power. The new regime was militantly opposed to any compromise, and was determined to completely crush the SPLA and all other opposition groups. An escalation of violence followed.

By 1991, the civil war had developed into a "network of internal wars" between the government and a multitude of rebel groups with widely diverging backgrounds and aims. Though the SPLA had grown in power and seized control of large parts of southern Sudan, it also suffered from internal disputes and had never enjoyed the support of the entire southern population. Many in the south had sided with the government or rebel groups that were opposed to the SPLA.

The region of Equatoria, including the important town of Yei, was strongly contested between the SPLA and the SAF for several years. The SAF would control the towns, whereas the rebels held much of the countryside. In the 1990s first half, however, the government managed to regain some ground in the area, retaking several locations from the rebels. At the time, the South Sudanese separatists were weakened by internal divisions and the collapse of the People's Democratic Republic of Ethiopia, their most important foreign ally. By 1994, the SPLA main faction under Garang's leadership was on the verge of complete defeat. Parts of the rebel movement had split off, and some of these splinter groups (such as SSIM/A) had even allied themselves with the government. The SPLA did however manage to recover and regain some strength in the Equatoria area. This was also thanks to the resumption of support by Ethiopia in 1995. Though the country's old, pro-SPLA leadership had been overthrown during the Ethiopian Civil War, Ethiopia's new government under Meles Zenawi was undermined by Sudan, and consequently decided to aid the South Sudanese separatists. Bashir's regime also alienated its former ally Eritrea, so that the latter began to assist the SPLA from 1994.

=== The Ugandan-Sudanese conflict ===
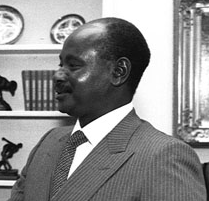
Though Ugandan President Yoweri Museveni (pictured in 1987) intended to maintain regional neutrality and rebuild his war-ravaged country, his policies and reputation made him the enemy of Sudan and Zaire.

The Sudanese government suspected that the survival of the South Sudanese rebels was dependent on support by the neighboring country of Uganda. This belief was not based on hard facts, but an assumed personal connection between SPLA leader John Garang and Ugandan President Yoweri Museveni. In truth, the two barely knew each other, and Museveni had intended to stay neutral in the Sudanese conflict. He repeatedly attempted to convince the Sudanese government of his non-involvement with the SPLA, and followed a policy of appeasement. This course yielded no results. The anti-Western, Islamist National Islamic Front government of Sudan regarded the Leftist, pro-United States government under Museveni as a natural enemy and supporter of the South Sudanese separatists. Furthermore, the Sudanese leadership intended to islamize the Great Lakes region, and in the context of this plan, mostly Christian "Uganda stood in the way".

In an effort to topple Museveni's government, Sudan thus supported and even organized several Ugandan insurgent groups from 1986, though the extent to which these rebels actually followed Sudanese orders varied greatly. By 1996, the most important pro-Sudanese Ugandan rebel groups were the WNBF, the UNRF (II) (a WNBF splinter faction), the ADF, and the LRA/LSA. Though these groups were not strong enough to actually threaten the Ugandan government, they could undermine its legitimacy by attacking the Ugandan population and further damage the country's struggling economy. They were generally based in southern Sudan or eastern Zaire (present-day DR Congo), whose dictator Mobutu Sese Seko tolerated their presence out of enmity toward Museveni. The Ugandan President responded to the Sudanese and Zairean support for these rebel groups by ending his neutrality in 1993. Uganda started to aid, and then coordinate with the SPLA in their common struggle against Sudan, the Ugandan insurgents, and Zaire. Furthermore, the conflict along the Sudanese-Ugandan-Zairean border intensified, as not just the various rebel factions but even the Sudanese and Ugandan militaries launched cross-border raids and bombardments.

== Prelude ==
Military situation in Zaire by April 1997

This volatile situation further escalated upon the outbreak of the First Congo War in 1996, as an alliance of rebel groups and states led by Rwanda invaded Zaire to topple Mobutu. Uganda joined this coalition, realizing that the war was an opportunity to eliminate Zaire as haven for Ugandan insurgents. As result, the Uganda People's Defence Force (UPDF) invaded northeastern Zaire, and helped the SPLA and the native Alliance of Democratic Forces for the Liberation of Congo (ADFL) to clear the region of the Zairian Armed Forces (FAZ) and other pro-Sudanese forces. Sudan attempted to aid its allies, but the FAZ was in a catastrophic condition and the Ugandan insurgents demotivated. Both were easily routed by the UPDF and its allies, and surrendered, deserted or fled en masse into southern Sudan.

With the pro-Sudanese forces in Zaire routed, the SPLA and its supporters occupied northeastern Zaire. The SPLA was thus in the position to launch offensive operations into Sudan from the Zairian side of the border. Two offensives were planned: "Operation Thunderbolt" which would take place west of the Nile, and "Operation Jungle Storm" (Note: The "Operation Jungle Storm" in 1997 should not be confused with the better known SPLA offensive of the same name that targeted Juba in 1992. There were several other offensives named "Jungle Storm" between 1993 and 1995 as well.) east of the Nile. The South Sudanese rebels amassed a force of about 12,000 fighters, including tanks and artillery, for Operation Thunderbolt. Salva Kiir was appointed overall commander of the SPLA troops involved in the offensive. Another important rebel commander during Operation Thunderbolt was James Hoth Mai.

The SPLA enjoyed strong support by foreign states, namely Uganda, Ethiopia, and Eritrea, during the preparation and execution of Operation Thunderbolt. (Note: According to Researcher Alex de Waal, Ugandan President Museveni and Ethiopian Prime Minister Zenawi instead of the SPLA leadership decided the scope of Operation Thunderbolt during a meeting at Gulu, and agreed that it should capture the border and Yei, but not to target Juba.) Each of these countries had its own goals which it hoped to achieve by aiding the SPLA in capturing Western and Central Equatoria. For Uganda, Operation Thunderbolt's main aim was to capture the entire border to block the SAF from advancing into Zaire to help its allies there. By helping the SPLA, Ethiopia intended to pressure the Sudanese government into ending its support for anti-Ethiopian militants. Eritrea hoped that its involvement in the conflict would weaken its rival Sudan, and reduce the influence of its other rival, Ethiopia, in southern Sudan. The foreign support for the SPLA during Operation Thunderbolt took several forms. First of all, the rebels were trained, provided with intelligence, and supplied with equipment by the UPDF, the Eritrean Army and the Ethiopian Army. Furthermore, many of the tanks and artillery pieces that took part in the operation were operated by crews belonging to the Ugandan, Eritrean, and Ethiopian militaries. Unidentified Ethiopian military officers directly commanded parts of the anti-Sudanese operation. President Museveni even ordered the UPDF to train at Monodo for a potential attack on the Sudanese border town of Kaya.

== The offensive ==
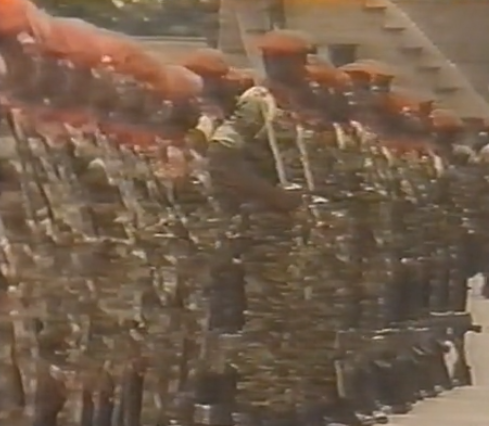
Zairean soldiers in the 1990s

The SPLA began the offensive amid the dry season on 9 March, attacking the Kaya and the road between Yei and Juba. The assault on Kaya was preceded by an artillery bombardement, and spearheaded by the Uganda People's Defence Force with tanks, howitzers, mortars, and machine guns. (Note: The Ugandan government officially denied involvement in the operation at the time, but later admitted that it had taken part in the offensive.) The Ugandan forces were under the overall command of Salim Saleh, with Katumba Wamala as operational commander. A task force of UPDF tanks led by Hannington Kyazze crossed a nearby river, and attacked Kaya from the rear. The SAF had previously realized that the SPLA was preparing an offensive, but the rebels managed to capture Kaya on the first day of the attack nonetheless, while the UPDF seized the strategically important nearby Koboko Mountain. Much heavy equipment fell to the UPDF at Kaya, while the town's remaining SAF soldiers retreated to Yei. The UPDF consequently destroyed a SAF artillery unit at Poki Hill near Kaya. On 10 March, the SPLA and UPDF captured Bazi and Gumuni, while the Sudanese and Ugandan militaries reportedly exchanged artillery fire across their common border.

The SPLA was thus able to encircle the SAF in a "massive pincer movement", and cut off the "big" garrison at Yei from Juba on 11 March. This rapid advance was "facilitated primarily by an Ethiopian tank unit", and UPDF tanks also played a major role in clearing the way for the South Sudanese rebels. Attempts by the Sudanese Air Force to supply Yei by air failed, as the air drops were captured by the rebels. In response to the rapid SPLA advances, the Sudanese government ordered the WNBF and UNRF (II) to aid the SAF in rearguard actions; this did little to stop the South Sudanese rebels. Instead, the Ugandan insurgents suffered heavy losses. Their worst defeat came amid the siege of Yei. Over 4,000 stragglers, including women and children, had fled Zaire, crossed the border at Morobo County, and advanced toward Yei. This column included WNBF forces under Juma Oris, as well as a smaller number of FAZ, SAF, and Ex-FAR (Note: Following the Rwandan Civil War, the Rwandan Armed Forces (FAR) had been forced into exile in eastern Zaire, from where they intended to retake their country. The new Rwandan government drove them from the region in 1996, and some Ex-FAR subsequently found refuge with the Sudanese government. In return, the EX-FAR soldiers fought against the SPLA.) soldiers. They hoped to find refuge at Yei, and did not know of the town's encirclement by the SPLA.

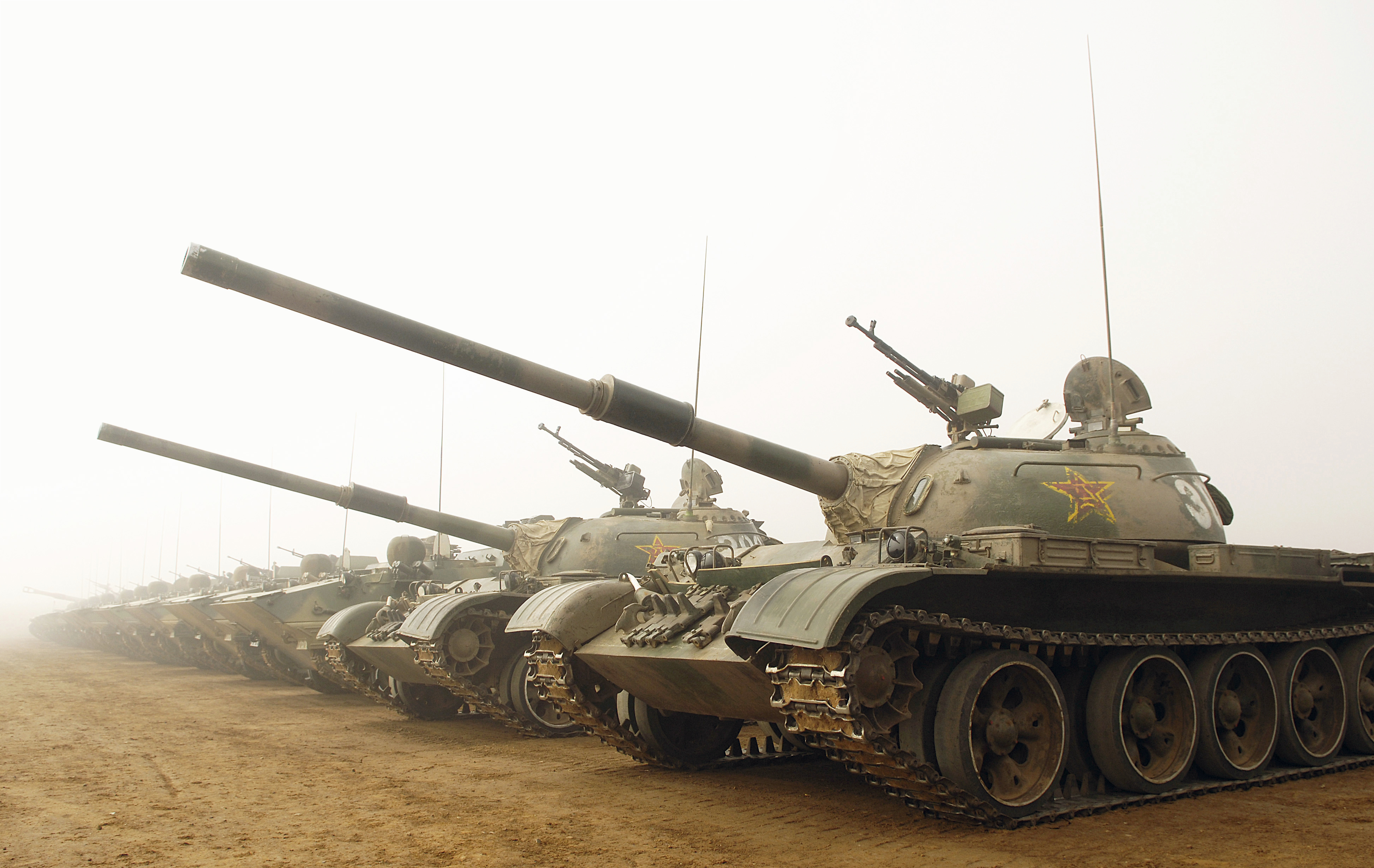
The SPLA rebels captured five T-59 tanks at Yei (T-59s in Chinese service pictured)

Instead of relieving Yei's garrison, the column was ambushed by the SPLA about halfway between Morobo and Yei, and suffered 3,000 casualties: 2,000 killed and 1,000 captured. The survivors were routed and fled in disarray to Juba. The column's leaders were mostly killed, wounded or captured: WNBF commander Juma Oris was badly wounded though escaped, while Ex-FAR Captain Jean-Marie Magabo was captured. Following this defeat, Yei's garrison surrendered on 12 or 13 March, though many of its fighters attempted to flee into the bush. They left behind much materiel, including at least nine 122mm howitzers, one 37mm anti-aircraft gun, and five Chinese-made T-59 tanks. Several WNBF fighters, including the militia's deputy commander Abdulatif Tiyua, were also captured in the town. The Sudanese government responded by ordering 2,000 SAF soldiers who were retreating toward Juba to instead march on Yei, officially to aid the besieged garrison, although the government knew that the town had already fallen. This counter-attack failed, and 1,000 SAF soldiers were captured or surrendered, while the rest were killed or scattered by the rebels.

The SPLA further advanced after its success at Yei, capturing the garrison towns of Morobo (12 March), (Note: Morobo had served as WNBF headquarters before its conquest by the SPLA.) Loka (13 March), the "heavily fortified" base of Lainya (15 March), Kagwada (16 March), and Kulipapa (17 March) in quick succession. The important town of Kajo-Kaji was taken by the South Sudanese rebels and UPDF on 24 March, and a SAF counter-attack along the Yei-Juba road was repelled two days later. The SPLA's advance was then halted by the onset of the wet season. The Kit River swell in volume and became difficult to cross, especially as one bridge had been destroyed by the SAF during its retreat. When the SPLA forces under Salva Kiir's command managed to cross the river, however, they launched "lightning strikes" against the next Sudanese bases. The garrison towns of Lui, Amadi, the Jambo road junction, Goja, Boje, and Moga were captured by the rebels on 2–3 April, followed by Mukungu (9 April), and Kit (12 April). Along with UPDF troops, the SPLA also attacked a LRA/LSA camp at Aru on 9–10 April. On 18 April, SPLA and UPDF units under James Kazini launched an attack on Tingiri and the Aru junction, while the UPDF's 23rd Battalion under Phenehas Mugyenyi was ordered to block the Aru-Juba road. The operation aimed at encircling the remaining LRA/LSA forces and to kill their leader Joseph Kony. Despite destroying the rebel camps and capturing hundreds of SAF soldiers, Kony escaped. Another Sudanese counter-attack from Kit Valley was defeated.

The remaining SAF units in the region were mostly forced to retreat. A counter-attack by the pro-government SSIM/A militia was repelled. As result, Juba itself became threatened by the SPLA, while SAF garrisons in Eastern Equatoria were cut off and had to be supplied by air from then on. However, an initial attack by the SPLA and UPDF on the strategically important Jabelein area, 39 miles (63 km) from Juba, partially failed. Five Ugandan tanks were lost during this assault. Much of Western Equatoria was left under rebel control, allowing the SPLA to launch further offensives in the north, most importantly "Operation Deng Nhial" (from mid-March) and "Operation Final Lap" (from June) during which rebel holdings in the Lakes and Warrap states were significantly expanded.

The SPLA claimed to have put 8,000 enemy troops "out of action" during Operation Thunderbolt, including a large number of Sudanese senior officers. "Several thousand" SAF soldiers were captured or surrendered near Yei. Likewise, the pro-Sudanese WNBF and UNRF (II) suffered heavy losses during the fighting in Equatoria. The WNBF lost 1,800 combatants at Yei and Morobo alone, of whom 800 were killed while the rest were captured. The high commands of both WNBF and UNRF (II) were mostly killed or captured in the offensive. In comparison, the SPLA suffered much lighter casualties.

== Aftermath ==
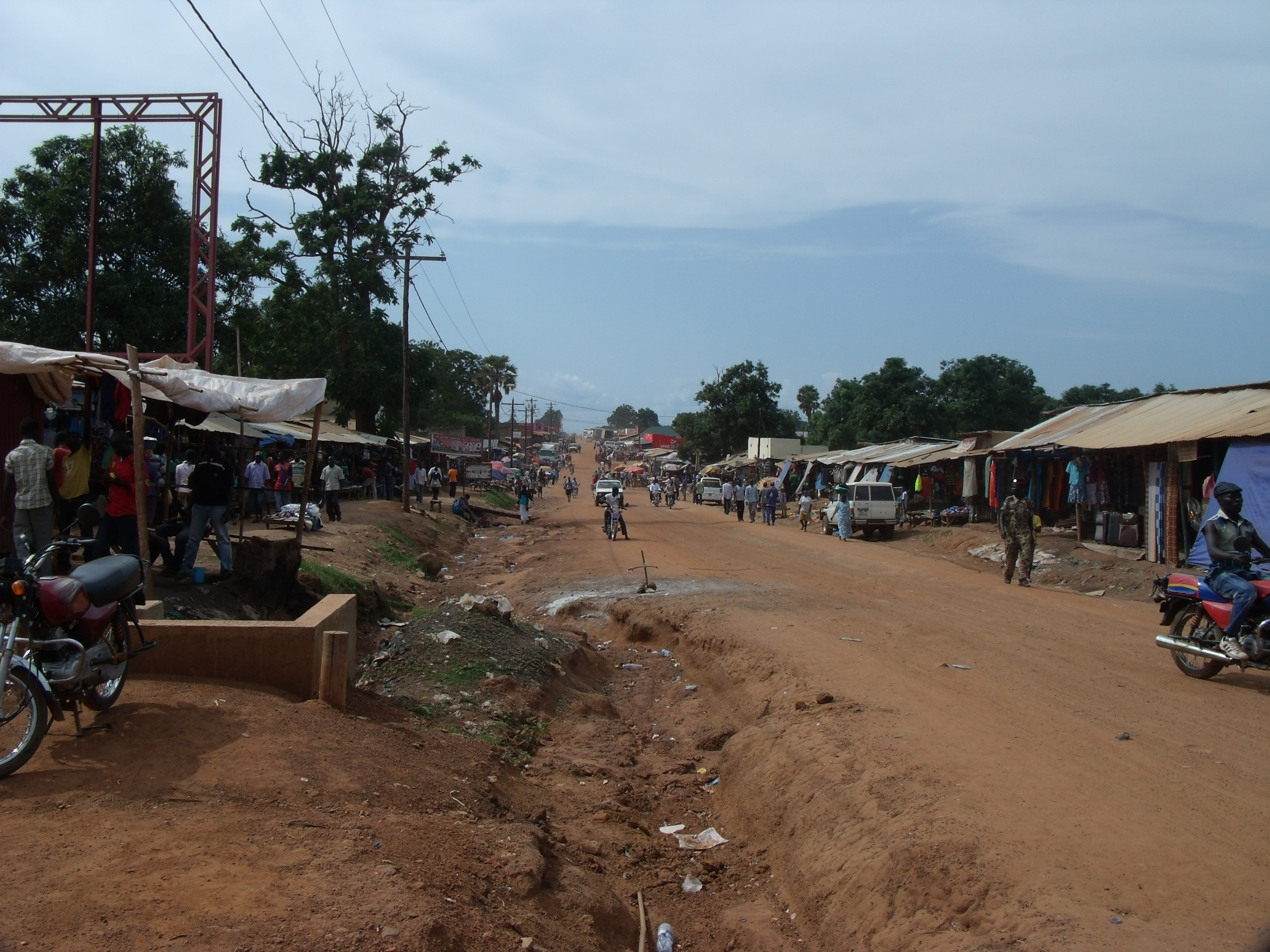
The town of Yei in 2012

The success of Operation Thunderbolt significantly improved the SPLA's military and political position. It had conquered numerous important towns, and was thereby more able to present itself as legitimate government of South Sudan. Much of the territory captured by the SPLA during Operation Thunderbolt remained in its hands until the civil war's end. The rebel group had also seized a large amount of small arms, ammunition, landmines, and heavier equipment such as artillery pieces, at least 60 tanks, anti-aircraft guns, and anti-tank cannons, greatly increasing its combat capabilities. Nevertheless, much of the weaponry and ammunition that fell into the hands of the SPLA was "degraded and of no use on the battlefield". The Sudanese government had had problems for years to properly supply its forces with modern arms, and the SAF was consequently forced to rely on obsolete, incompatible, or badly worn equipment. Operation Thunderbolt, along with simultaneous offensives by the SPLA and other insurgents, further worsened the Sudanese government's dire shortages in manpower and equipment. The regime was reportedly forced to resort to forcibly recruiting schoolboys, train them just 15 days, and then send them into battle with no more than a gun, a Quran page to "ward off infidel bullets", and a key to unlock Heaven's Gate if they fell in combat. The NIF leadership also increased its efforts to enlist the aid of various militias to keep the SPLA at bay.

I believe it's the most significant victory in the south to date. Yei is pivotal to the whole war situation.... It was the main battle. I believe the war in the south is over. There is nothing that the regime will do, or can do, to reverse this. We are confident that we will indeed capture Juba and not only that, we will bring down the whole regime. That is the final target.

— John Garang, leader of the SPLA

The capture of Yei was one of the most important successes for the SPLA. It provided the rebel group with an international propaganda boost, as it portrayed its own rule in the town as free and fair in contrast to the previous administration which was widely perceived as oppressive. SPLA leader John Garang even declared that with Yei in rebel hands, the SPLA had almost won the civil war in southern Sudan; this assessment proved premature. In fact, the conflict had effectively become a stalemate, as neither the government nor the insurgents were capable of completely defeating each other. The war continued until the Comprehensive Peace Agreement was signed seven years later in 2005.

The SPLA was however not very popular with the local Equatorians, and many of them opted to flee into Zaire and Uganda rather than live under SPLA rule. In turn, the SPLA settled a large number of its fighters and their families, mostly ethnic Dinka, in Yei. As Yei remained relatively stable and its security improved over the following years, the town underwent an economic upturn. Cross-border trade in the region increased, and many refugees from around Sudan and the Congo settled in Yei. The SPLA made Yei its new headquarters in summer 1997.

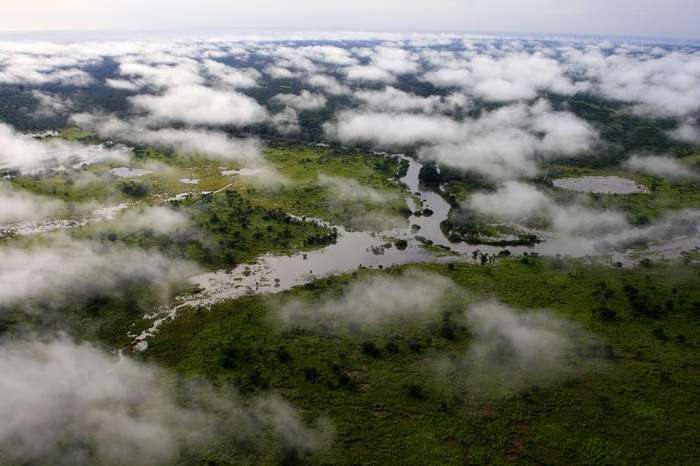
The Ugandan rebels found refuge in the Garamba National Park (pictured) after their defeats in Operation Thunderbolt and other battles.

The capture of Yei was also a major success for the SPLA's allies. Uganda did not just prevent a Sudanese incursion into Zaire, and thus fulfilled its main strategic goal during the offensive. Operation Thunderbolt also weakened the WNBF and UNRF (II) to a great extent, diminishing their ability to fight the Ugandan government and its allies. Of the two, the WNBF was in a worse situation. As it had also suffered from internal disputes, and mass desertions, the massive defeat in Sudan meant that the WNBF's "insurgency was essentially spent by 1997". Nevertheless, the Sudanese government continued to support the remaining remnants of WNBF and UNRF (II) that had fled into the Garamba National Park. UPDF soldiers thus remained stationed in and around Yei until at least 2008, securing the area against pro-Sudanese rebels. The Ugandan insurgents who were in SPLA custody following Operation Thunderbolt (including 500–1,000 WNBF fighters) were eventually expatriated to Uganda. Ethiopia also achieved what it had wanted, namely to pressure the Sudanese government into reducing its support for anti-Ethiopian militants in the Horn of Africa. By the time Ethiopia pulled all of its troops from southern Sudan in May 1998 to respond to the Eritrean–Ethiopian War, the Sudanese leadership had conceded to the principal demands of Ethiopia.
