= Atiak–Laropi Road =

Ugandan road

Coordinates: 03°23′28″N 31°57′05″E

Route information
- Length: 41 mi (66 km)
- History: Designated in 2020; Completion in 2023 (Expected)

Major junctions
- South end: Atiak
- Zapi; Adjumani
- North end: Laropi

Location
- Country: Uganda

Highway system
- Roads in Uganda

The Atiak–Laropi Road is a road in the Northern Region of Uganda. The road connects the urban centers of Atiak, in Amuru District to Adjumani, in Adjumani District to end in the town of Laropi, in Moyo District.

== Location ==
The road starts at Atiak and continues in a general northwesterly direction, through the towns of Zapi, Pekelle and Adjumani, to end at the shores of the Albert Nile at Laropi, in Moyo District, a total distance of approximately 66 kilometres (41 mi).

== Overview ==
The Atiak–Laropi Road, is a component of the 105 kilometres (65 mi) Atiak–Adjumani–Moyo–Afoji Road. The gravel-surfaced road is dusty and pot-holed during the dry season. In the rainy season, the road develops gullies and presents navigational challenges.

== Upgrading to bitumen ==
The upgrade of the road to grade II bitumen standard, with culverts, shoulders and drainage channels began in 2020. The work was contracted to Strabag International, a construction multinational, headquartered in Vienna, Austria. The construction bill is calculated at €54 million, jointly funded by the government of Uganda (10 percent) and the European Development Fund (90 percent). Work started in March 2020, with completion expected in 2023. The work includes the construction of landing piers on both banks of the Albert Nile, one at Umi, Adjumani District and another, directly across the river at Laropi, Moyo District.

The engineering supervision contract, worth €3.8 million (UGX:15.5 billion), was awarded to Eptisa Engineering Services (Spanish: Eptisa Servicios de Ingenieria SL), a company from Spain. Civil works were commissioned on 11 September 2020. Completion is expected in 2023.

== See also ==
- Transport in Uganda
- Economy of Uganda
- Atiak–Adjumani–Moyo–Afoji Road
