= Moyo Water Supply and Sanitation System =

Water supply and sanitation system in Uganda

- Location within Uganda
- Interactive map of Moyo Water Supply and Sanitation System
- Location: Moyo Town, Moyo District
- Coordinates: 03°37′33″N 31°43′54″E
- Cost: US$1.825 million (UGX:6.4 billion)
- Technology: Sedimentation, Chlorination
- Percent of water supply: 100% of Moyo Municipality Metropolitan Area
- Operation date: 3 September 2021

Moyo Water Supply and Sanitation System (MWSS), also Moyo Water Supply and Sewerage System is a water intake, purification, distribution and waste water collection and disposal system in Moyo Town and surrounding metropolis in Moyo District, Uganda.

== Location ==
The water treatment facility is located in Moyo Municipality, in Moyo District, in the West Nile sub-region, in Uganda's Northern Region. The raw water is sourced from two boreholes (Pamoju 1 and Pamoju 2), located in town's neighborhood known as Pamoju.

== Overview ==
Prior to 2020, Moyo Municipality was supplied with water from a small antiquated system with a capacity to supply no more than 500 customers. The water scarcity in the town adversely affected businesses, families, schools and refugee centres.

In 2020, the government of Uganda, through the Uganda Ministry of Water and Environment and with joint funding from KfW of Germany, designed the Moyo Water Supply and Sanitation System.

The water supply system comprises two boreholes; Pamoju 1 and Pamoju 2. Water is pumped from these water sources to two overhead storage reservoirs of 300 cubic meters (300,000 L) and 164 cubic meters (164,000 L) for a total 464 cubic meters (464,000 L) of water storage. Distribution pipes then convey the potable water to end-users.

== Construction and funding ==
In 2020, the Uganda Ministry of Water and Environment, which is the implementing agency, awarded the engineering, procurement and construction (EPC) contract to Reddy's Borehole and Technical Services, a Ugandan company. Bright Technical Services, another Ugandan company, was the engineering supervisor. The construction cost is reported as USh6.4 billion (approx.US$1.855 million).

== Other considerations ==
The sanitation component of the system comprises (a) "two blocks of six-station drainable latrines" constructed at one of the primary schools and (b) "a 13-stall toilet", connected to a septic tank. Construction lasted approximately one year.

The system as configured in September 2021 benefits an estimated 28,500 people in 39 villages in Moyo Municipality and environs.

== See also ==
- Ministry of Water and Environment (Uganda)
- National Water and Sewerage Corporation
