= Moyo General Hospital =

- Uganda Ministry of Health

Geography
- Location: Moyo, Moyo District, Northern Region, Uganda
- Coordinates: 03°38′59″N 31°43′38″E

Organisation
- Care system: Public
- Type: General

Services
- Emergency department: I
- Beds: 176

History
- Founded: 1972

Links
- Other links: Hospitals in Uganda

Moyo General Hospital also Moyo Hospital, is a hospital in the Northern Region of Uganda.

== Location ==
The hospital is located in the central business district of Moyo Town, in Moyo District, in West Nile sub-region, in Northern Uganda, approximately 160 kilometres (99 mi) northeast of Arua Regional Referral Hospital.

This is approximately 157 kilometres (98 mi) northwest of Gulu Regional Referral Hospital. The coordinates of Moyo General Hospital are:03°38'59.0"N, 31°43'38.0"E (Latitude:3°38'59.0"N; Longitude:31°43'38.0"E).

== Overview ==
The hospital was built during the late 1960s and was commissioned by Idi Amin in 1972. The hospital infrastructure is dilapidated and the equipment is antiquated or non-functional. The hospital is severely under-staffed, employing only 60 nurses out of the 120 needed. As of January 2016, the facility had no functioning ambulance.

== Renovations ==
In 2013, the government of Uganda secured funding from the World Bank, to repair and renovate certain hospitals, Moyo General Hospital among them. The US$4,541,931.32 contract was awarded to Prism Construction Company Limited. Work that started in February 2014 consists of the following, among others:

- Build new emergency department (casualty department)
- Build a new, larger outpatient department
- Build a new building to house the diesel-powered electricity generator
- Build a new placenta disposal pit
- Build a new medical waste disposal pit
- Build a laundry facility for patients' families
- Build a kitchen and dining room for patients' families
- Build ventilated improved pit latrines for patient families and outpatients
- Construct two new staff houses

The construction started in February 2014 with expected completion in October 2015. However, due to multiple delays, the new expected completion date is June 2016.

== See also ==
- List of hospitals in Uganda
