= Juma Oris =

Ugandan military officer

- Oris as minister in the 1970s.

Minister of Foreign Affairs
- In office 25 May 1975 – 1978
- Preceded by: Idi Amin (formally); Himself (as acting minister)
- Succeeded by: Idi Amin

Minister of Information and Broadcasting of Uganda
- In office ?–1978
- Succeeded by: Idi Amin

Minister for Animal Resources and Minister of Lands
- In office ?–1979

Personal details
- Born: Northern Uganda or Nimule, Sudan
- Died: March 2001 Khartoum or Juba, Sudan
- Occupation: Military officer, politician, militia leader, mercenary

Military service
- Allegiance: Uganda; Sudan
- Branch/service: Uganda Army; Sudanese Armed Forces; Former Uganda National Army; Uganda National Rescue Front; West Nile Bank Front
- Years of service: ?–1979; 1980s–1990s
- Rank: Colonel
- Battles/wars: Uganda–Tanzania War; Ugandan Bush War; War in Uganda (1986-1994); Second Sudanese Civil War (WIA)

Juma Abdalla Oris (Note: Also known as Tana Abdalla Oris.) (died in March 2001) was a Ugandan military officer and government minister during the dictatorship of Idi Amin. After fleeing his country during the Uganda–Tanzania War, he became leader of the West Nile Bank Front (WNBF), a rebel group active in the West Nile region of Uganda during the 1990s.

== Biography ==
Juma Abdalla Oris was born in northern Uganda, or Nimule in southern Sudan. He was a Muslim and, ethnically, a Madi and/or Nubian. Oris received only minimal education, and eventually joined the Uganda Army, becoming a high-ranking colonel by the early 1970s.

Following the 1971 Ugandan coup d'état, he rose to be one of the leading figures in Idi Amin's government. He first became acting Minister of Foreign Affairs, and was appointed full foreign minister on 25 May 1975. He stayed in this position until 1978, while also serving as Minister of Information and Broadcasting. Following his takeover of the Information Ministry, a series of new directives and restrictions were handed down to the Ugandan news industry. All newspapers had to print Amin's statements in full, and Radio Uganda and Uganda Television had to transmit them in full. In addition to this, the latter two had to open and close every broadcast with a daily national prayer. Oris also sharply criticised Uganda's two private newspapers, Munno and Taifa, for supposedly conveying false information about Amin because they were not printing the same stories as the government daily, the Voice of Uganda. He was regarded as follower of Vice President Mustafa Adrisi. Oris was dismissed from his position as foreign minister as well as from all of his ministerial portfolios by Amin in 1978, probably as part of a political purge following Adrisi's removal from power. Officially, Amin claimed that Oris had been fired because Uganda's image abroad had been mismanaged and Ugandan diplomats had not been paid regularly under his tenure.

Shortly thereafter in late 1978, Ugandan troops invaded neighboring Tanzania under unclear circumstances, causing the Uganda–Tanzania War. Tanzania responded with a counter-invasion, and Amin's government began to collapse. Oris was one of the few Ugandan officers who remained loyal throughout most of the conflict. By 1979, he had been appointed Minister for Animal Resources and Minister of Lands. On 4 April 1979, Amin organized a four‐member war planning committee which consisted of his most trusted followers, including Oris. By this point, the Uganda Army had mostly disintegrated. After the Fall of Kampala, Oris fled with 3,000 cattle into exile to Sudan. He had good connections to the Sudanese security services by this point, and even joined the Sudanese Armed Forces as a mercenary at one point. He recruited West Nile people for a Sudanese contingent that fought in the Iran–Iraq War on behalf of Iraq. Using these connections, Oris helped to organize a coalition of ex-Uganda Army groups in the refugee camps of Sudan. These rebels launched an insurgency in 1980, starting the Ugandan Bush War. Oris became a member of the Former Uganda National Army (FUNA) as well as the Uganda National Rescue Front (UNRF), both of which fought in the Bush War. In the late 1980s and early 1990s Joseph Kony, the leader of the rebel group known as the Lord's Resistance Army claimed to be possessed by the spirit of Juma Oris. It appears he was unaware that Oris was at the time still alive—something which he discovered when the two men eventually met in person.

Oris founded his own rebel army, called the "West Nile Bank Front" (WNBF), in 1994. Though founded in Zaire with the blessing of Mobutu Sese Seko, the group was mostly supported by the government of Sudan, as Mobutu's regime was already in terminal decline by this point. The WNBF fought for the secession of the West Nile sub-region or the restoration of Idi Amin as President of Uganda. Oris managed to gain support in northern Uganda by exploiting ethnic tensions and the lack of development opportunities in the area, offering potential recruits money in exchange for joining the WNBF. While waging an insurgency against the Ugandan government, Oris allegedly committed human rights violations by planting landmines in ambush attempts. He also fought with his followers in the Second Sudanese Civil War on the side of the Sudanese government. In March 1997, the WNBF and its allies suffered a heavy defeat when South Sudanese rebels of the SPLA overran their bases in Zaire and Sudan, and then ambushed their retreating forces near Yei during Operation Thunderbolt. Oris was badly wounded during this battle, and the WNBF almost completely destroyed. Most WNBF fighters, including deputy commander Abdulatif Tiyua, were killed or captured. Oris and the remnants of his militia subsequently fled to Juba. From then on, the WNBF was "essentially spent" as fighting force.

Having suffered a stroke in late 1999, Oris was bedridden from then on. His condition worsened in early 2001, and he died at his home in Juba or Khartoum in March 2001. This disproved earlier reports according to which he had been killed in battle with the Uganda Peoples' Defence Forces. Oris was buried in Sudan.
