= Obongi District =

District in Northern Uganda

Coordinates: 3°23′N 31°32′E

- District
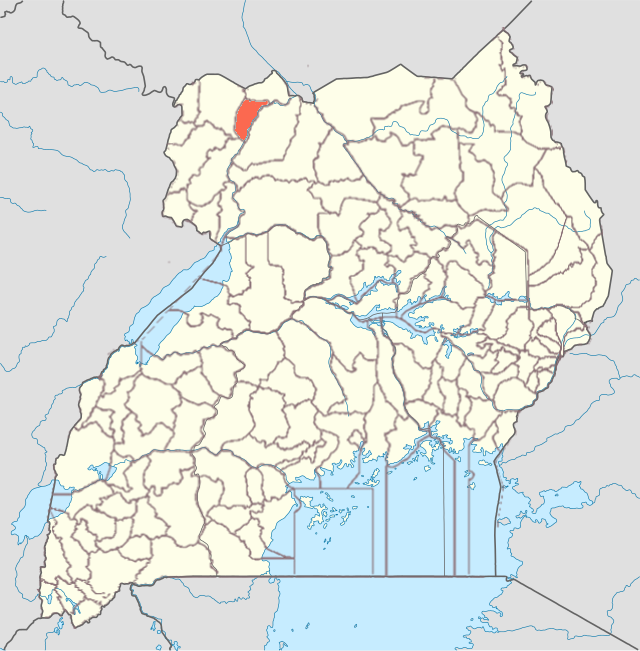

- Map of Uganda showing the location of Karenga.
- Country: Uganda
- Region: Northern Uganda
- Established: 1 July 2019

Population (2020)
  - Total: 49,100
- Time zone: UTC+3 (EAT)

Obongi District is a district in Northern Uganda. it is located in the West Nile region of Uganda. The district headquarters are located in Obongi town.

== Geography ==
It was carved out of Moyo District located in the Northern region of Uganda. its operations started on Monday 1 July 2019. The population is 49,100, divided over five subcounties of Palorinya, Gimara, Itula, Aliba, Ewafa and Obongi town council.

It stretches from Odraji in Palorinya up to Alibabito in Ewafa.It is bordered by Moyo in the north, Adjumani District in the east, Yumbe in the west and Madi-okollo in the south.

== Leadership ==
It sends two MPs to the Parliament of Uganda who are: Honorable Bhoka George Didi, the directly elected MP, and Zomura Manezo the Woman Member of Parliament and the current Local Council Five (LC) Chairman is Hon. Hajj Abib Khemis Buga.

== Economic activity ==
The main economic activity done in Obongi District is subsistence farming and fishing.

== Demographics and languages ==
Obongi District is home to a linguistically diverse population of Ugandan nationals and refugees. Languages commonly spoken include Madi, Reli, Gimara, Alur, Aliba, Lugbara, Kakwa, Kuku, Arabic, Kiswahili, and English are also used, particularly in trade, education, and administration.

As of 2019, the population of Ugandan nationals in the district was estimated at 43,140, comprising approximately 21,740 females and 21,400 males. The district also hosts refugees and as of estimates from 2019, the number of refugees was at approximately 120,000, exceeding the population of Ugandan nationals in the district.

== Economy ==
The main food crops grown include;

- cassava
- Maize
- Sorghum
- Beans
- Groundnuts
- Simsiim and cotton grown for cash

== See also ==
- Moyo district
- Adjumani district
