= Atiak–Adjumani–Moyo–Afoji Road =

Ugandan road

Route information
- Length: 63 mi (101 km)
- History: Designated in 2011; Expected completion 2023 (Atiak–Laropi)

Major junctions
- South end: Atiak
- Adjumani; Moyo
- North end: Afoji

Location
- Country: Uganda

Highway system
- Roads in Uganda

The Atiak–Adjumani–Moyo–Afonji Road is in the Northern Region of Uganda, connecting the towns of Atiak, Adjumani, Moyo, and Afoji at the international border with South Sudan.

== Location ==
From Atiak in the Amuru District on the Gulu–Nimule Road, the road proceeds in a northwesterly direction to Adjumani, the headquarters of the Adjumani District. It then continues northwards, crossing the Albert Nile at Laropi and continuing to Moyo, the headquarters of Moyo District and on to the settlement of Afoji at the border with South Sudan. The road length measures approximately 101 kilometres (63 mi).

The road crosses the Albert Nile at Umi, Adjumani District, connecting across the river to Laropi, Moyo District, via a ferry.

== Overview ==
This transport corridor allows access to the country of South Sudan, through Moyo District, connecting to Gulu, the largest city in the Northern Region of Uganda. The gravel-surfaced road develops gullies and becomes difficult and sometimes impossible to navigate during the rainy season. In the dry season the road is dusty and pot-holed.

== History ==
Beginning in 1998, the government of Uganda began to solicit feasibility and impact assessment studies concerning the rehabilitation of this road.

When the Uganda National Roads Authority (UNRA) was formed in 2008, this road came under its supervision.

In December 2010, UNRA awarded a contract to Spencon Services Limited to carry out "construction of the bridge structures, box culverts and ferry landing sites" on this road, at a contract price of UGX:15.95 billion (approx. US$5 million then). The work lasted one year.

== Atiak–Laropi Road ==
In March 2020, upgrading to class II bitumen standard began of the Atiak–Laropi Road, which is the southern component of the Atiak–Adjumani–Moyo–Afoji Road, covering the southernmost 66 kilometres (41 mi). The work, expected to last 30 months is being carried out by Strabag International, of Austria, at a contract price of €54 million, co-funded by the European Development Fund and the government of Uganda.

== See also ==
- List of roads in Uganda
