= James Hoth Mai =

South Sudanese army officer (born 1959)

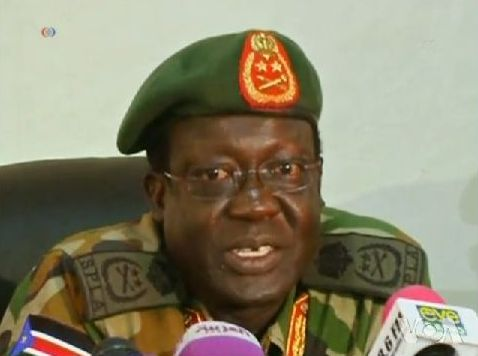
- General Hoth Mai fronting a news conference in Juba, January 2014
- Born: November 30, 1959 (age 66); Ulang County, Upper Nile, Republic of Sudan
- Military career
- Allegiance: South Sudan
- Branch: Sudan People's Liberation Army
- Service years: 1983–present
- Rank: General
- Commands: SPLA (as Chief of General Staff)
- Conflicts: Second Sudanese Civil War; South Sudanese Civil War

General James Hoth Mai (born November 30, 1959) is a South Sudanese army officer. He served as Chief of General Staff of the Sudan People's Liberation Army (SPLA) from 2009 until 2014. James Hoth Mai is the current Chairman of the S.Sudan second largest tribe, The Nuer since 2013, just in aftermath of the war. James Hoth is the current minister of Labor 2020 TRANSITIONAL government of the National unity, South Sudan. 2021. He is also an MP in the national Parliament, representing Ulang county.

== Biography ==
Ethnically a member of the Nuer people, Hoth was born in Ulang County, Upper Nile. He joined the Sudan People's Liberation Army (SPLA) in 1983, and fought with it against the Sudanese government in the Second Sudanese Civil War. Rising in the ranks, he served as head of the SPLA's commandos, was appointed chief of operations for several SPLA offensives named "Operation Jungle Storm" between 1993 and 1995, and took part in Operation Thunderbolt (1997). By the end of the civil war in 2005, Hoth served as Deputy Chief of Staff for Logistics in the SPLA.

Formally Deputy Chief of Staff for Operations, then Deputy Chief of Staff for Logistics, he preplaced Oyay Deng Ajak as Chief of General Staff in May 2009. Promoted to lieutenant general in his new position, he was then promoted to full general in July 2010. In April 2014 he was sacked by president Salva Kiir.

Hoth Mai holds a Master's degree in Public Administration from the University of Fort Hare in South Africa.
