= Basilica of the Uganda Martyrs =

Basilica of the Uganda Martyrs can refer to:

- Basilica of the Uganda Martyrs, Namugongo, in Wakiso District
- Munyonyo Martyrs' Shrine, a minor basilica in the Kampala area
