= Moyo Airport =

- IATA: OYG; ICAO: none

Summary
- Airport type: Public
- Owner: Moyo Town Council
- Serves: Moyo, Uganda
- Location: Moyo, Uganda
- Elevation AMSL: 3,100 ft (940 m)
- Coordinates: 03°38′57″N 031°45′54″E

Map
- Location of Moyo Airport in Uganda; Placement on map is approximate

Runways
Direction	Length		Surface
Direction	ft	m	Surface
02/20	4,260	1,298	Unpaved

Moyo Airport (IATA: OYG) is an airport in Moyo, Uganda.

== Location ==
Moyo Airport is located in the town of Moyo, Moyo District, West Nile sub-region, in Northern Uganda, close to the International border with South Sudan. Its location is approximately 406 kilometres (252 mi), by air, north of Entebbe International Airport, the country's largest civilian and military airport. The geographic coordinates of this airport are 3°38′56″N 31°45′52″E.

== Overview ==
Moyo Airport is a small civilian airport that serves the town of Moyo. As of August 2011, the airport is not yet under the administration of the Uganda Civil Aviation Authority. Moyo Airport is situated 3,100 feet (940 m) above sea level. The airport has a single unpaved runway which measures 4,260 feet (1,300 m) long.

== See also ==
- Moyo Town
- Moyo District
- Civil Aviation Authority of Uganda
- List of airports in Uganda
- Eagle Air (Uganda)
