= Zomura Manezo =

Ugandan politician

- Citizenship: Ugandan
- Known for: Politics
- Title: Member of parliament

Zomura Manezo is a Ugandan politician and member of the parliament. She was elected in office as a woman Member to represent Obongi district located in the Northern part of Uganda during the 2021 Uganda general elections.

She is a member of the ruling National Resistance Movement party.

== See also ==
- List of members of the eleventh Parliament of Uganda
- Parliament of Uganda
