= Uganda Red Cross Society =

Humanitarian organization in Uganda

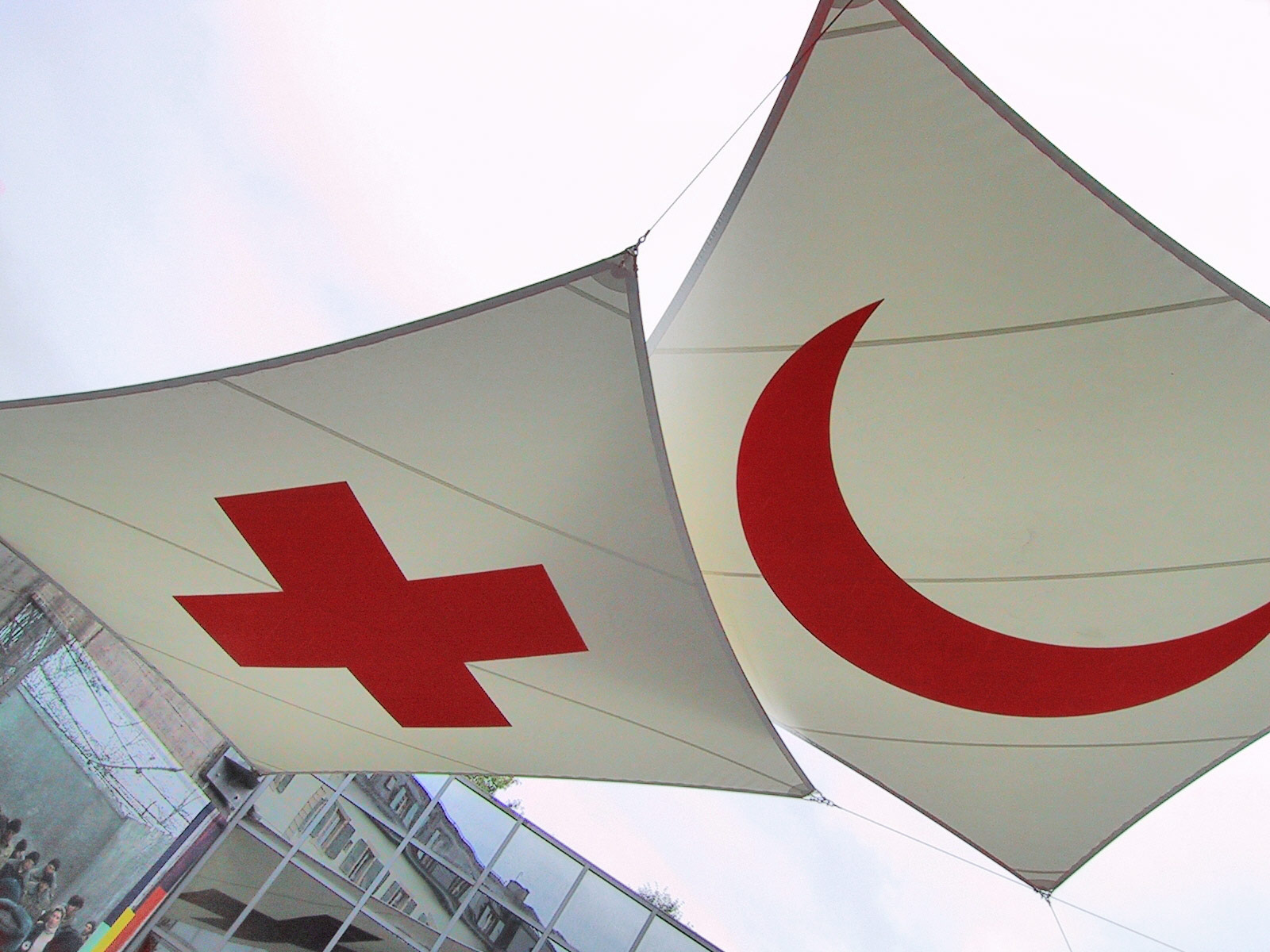
- The Red Cross and Red Crescent emblems, the symbols from which the movement derives its name.
- Founded: 1964
- Type: Act of Parliament
- Purpose: Humanitarian
- Headquarters: Plot 551/555 Rubaga Road
- Location: Kampala, Uganda
- Region served: Uganda
- Method: Aid
- Website: https://www.redcrossug.org

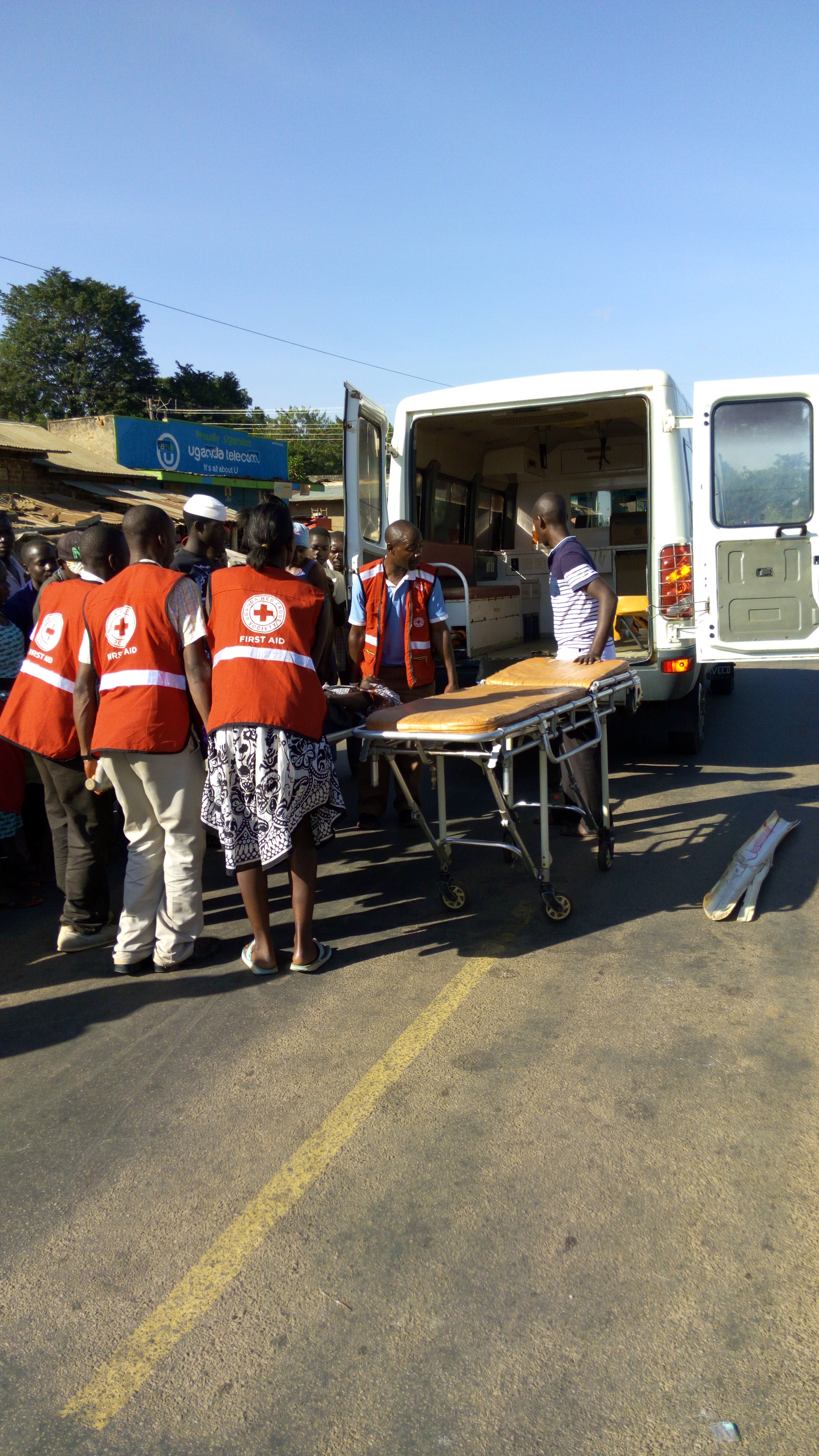
Uganda Red Cross Society putting a casualty into the ambulance to be taken to hospital after offering first aid.

Uganda Red Cross Society (URCS) is a membership humanitarian organization in Uganda. It focuses on humanitarian aid and community services charity in Uganda. It is a national member of the International Red Cross and Red Crescent Movement who draws mandates from the Geneva Conventions.

The National Society was founded in 1939 by a group of women in Entebbe, then in 1941 it became a branch part of the British Red Cross. It has its headquarters in Rubaga Road, Kampala.

Official emblem used by the national society

The Uganda Red Cross Society is noted as the leading humanitarian organization in Uganda.

== History of the Uganda Red Cross ==
It was founded in 1939 by a community group of women in Entebbe, then later became a branch of the British Red Cross in 1941. In 1964 under an Act of Parliament, the Uganda Red Cross Constitution was adopted bringing into existence the Uganda Red Cross Society as an auxiliary to the government of Uganda in providing humanitarian services. A year later in 1965, the Society was admitted as a member of the International Federation of the Red Cross and Red Crescent Movement(IFRC).

Uganda Red Cross Society has continued to grow over the years and it now has 51 branches and 30 sub-branches spanning the whole of Uganda. The National Society also works with a number of partners in the execution of its mission. These include the Government of Uganda, United Nations agencies, international funding agencies, companies and practicing sister Red Cross National Societies.

== Work ==
The Uganda Red Cross Society through the Ministry of Health has been involved in a number of health relief efforts including training of village health teams, tracing contact persons, supporting safe and dignified burials for cases of viral diseases like Ebola.It is noted that the National Society played an auxiliary role in ensuring that Uganda is Ebola free

The National Society has also helped in ensuring sustainable use of energy resources for some refugee groups living in settlements like Bidi Bidi Refugee Settlement by encouraging the use of alternative energy technologies for cooking and lighting, among others, as a way of reducing the cost of living in these settlements.

== The Fundamental Principles ==
Uganda Red Cross Society operates under the seven fundamental principles that guide all Red Cross and Red Crescent movements worldwide:

1.Humanity

Protection and respect for humanity

Promotion of health and life

Prevention or lessening of human suffering

2. Impartiality

Serving humanity without discrimination based on race, political affiliation, ethnicity, religion etc.

3. Neutrality

No taking sides in times of conflict or engaging in controversies of political, religious, racial or ideological nature

4. Independence

National Societies must remain independent in their decision making

No external influence, no strings attached

5. Voluntary Service

Services to the beneficiaries are free of charge

6.Unity

One National society in each country is open to all

7. Universality

The Movement is global in nature

== Core programs ==
The following are the core programs and interventions of URCS;

- Disaster Response and Management (DRM)
- Emergency Preparedness and Response
- Restoration of Family Links
- Supporting Communities for Resilience
- Health and Social Services
- Emergency health, first aid and ambulance services
- Blood donor recruitment(BDR)
- Water Sanitation and Hygiene(WASH)
- Keep a Girl in School Initiative (KAGIS)
- Pandemics and Epidemics response
- Youth and Women empowerment
- Sustainability

These are the URCS core values:

- Accountabilty
- Equity/Equality
- Professionalism
- Responsive
- Value for People

== Leadership ==
The Table below shows the Senior Management team at Uganda Red Cross Society.
S/N	NAME	POSITION
1.	ROBERT KWESIGA	SECRETARY GENERAL
2.	BRIAN KANAAHE	DIRECTOR DISASTER RISK MANAGEMENT
3.	HARRIET KAGOYA	DIRECTOR OPERATIONS
4.	JOSEPHINE OKWERA	DIRECTOR HEALTH AND SOCIAL SERVICES
5.	IRENE NAKASIITA	DIRECTOR COMMUNICATIONS RESOURCE MOBILIZATION AND PARTNERSHIPS
6.	NAPHTAL BAGUMA	DIRECTOR LOGISTICS AND SUPPLY CHAIN MANAGEMENT
7.	ORWIN TUMUHIRWE	DIRECTOR HUMAN RESOURCE AND ADMINISTRATION
8.	APOLLO ENGWAU	DIRECTOR FINANCE
9.	ARMSTRONG ASIIMIRE	DIRECTOR BRANCH AND MEMBERSHIP DEVELOPMENT

=== The table below shows the Central Governing Board(2022-2026) At Uganda Red Cross Society ===
S/N	NAME	POSITION
1.	Dr.Halid Kirunda	Chairperson
2.	Betty Justine Anyiri	Vice Chairperson
3.	Hon. Stephen Tashobya	Honorary Treasurer
4.	Sylvia Achebet	Member
5.	Joseph Mukasa	Member
6.	Alex Luganda	Member
7.	Aisha Nabukera Nnakeyenze	Member
8.	Lawrence Kizza	Member
9.	Prof. Vinand Nantulya	Member
10.	Hon. Ssempala Kigozi Emmanuel	Member
11.	Saviour Yoningom	National Youth Council Chairperson
12.	Suzan Nayebare	National Youth Council Vice Chairperson
13.	Charles Hamya	Member
14.	John Muheirwoha	Member
