= Osaka Yuhigaoka Gakuen Junior College =

- 大阪夕陽丘学園短期大学
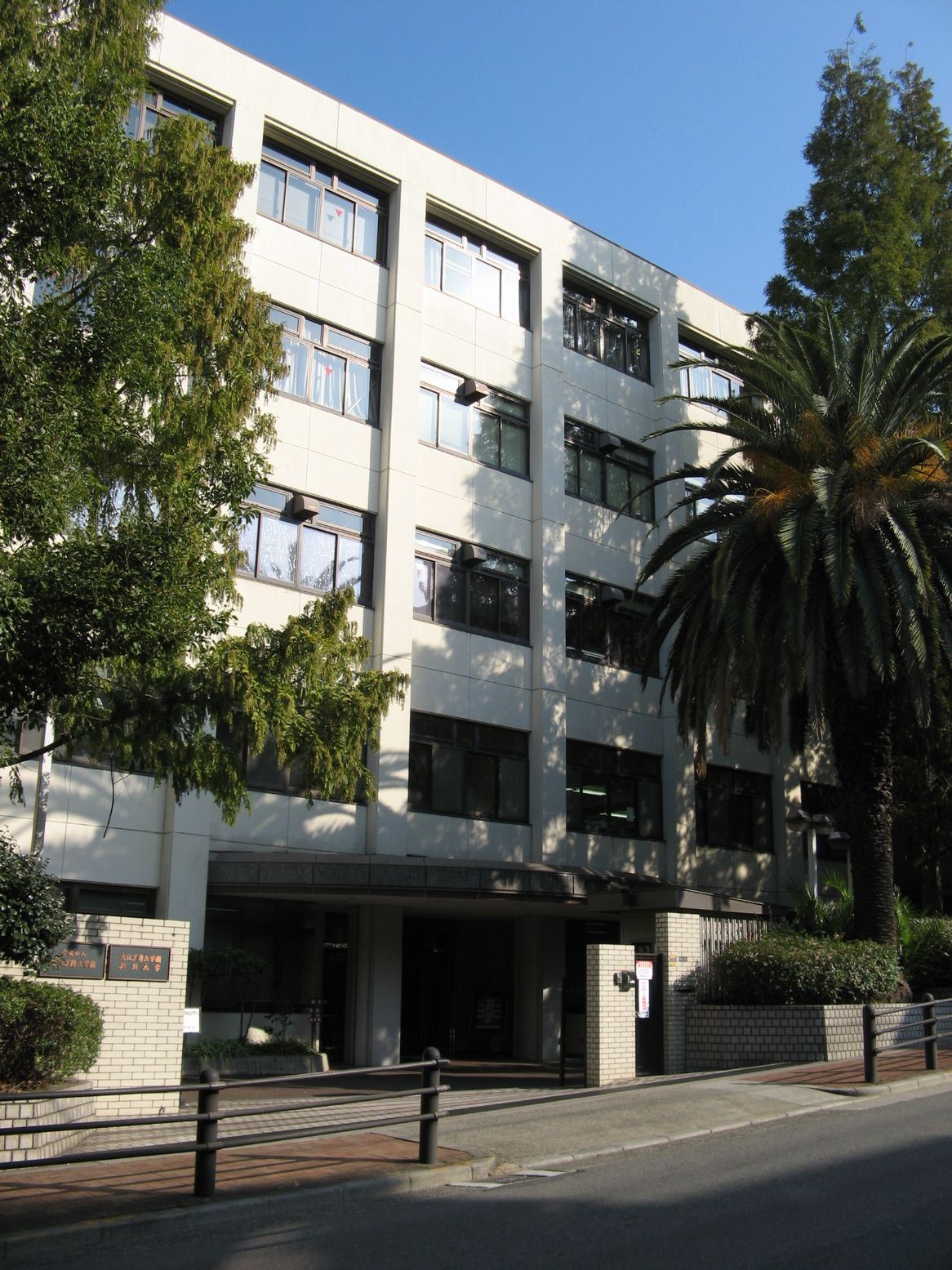
- Main building
- Type: Private
- Established: 1950
- Founder: Junkichi Satomi
- Parent institution: Osaka Yuhigaoka Gakuen
- Location: Tennōji-ku, Osaka, Japan; 34°39′35.4″N 135°30′47.8″E
- Campus: Urban
- Website: www.oyg.ac.jp/js/
- Location in Osaka Prefecture

Osaka Yuhigaoka Gakuen Junior College (大阪夕陽丘学園短期大学, Ōsaka yūhigaoka gakuen tanki daigaku) is a private women's junior college in Tennōji-ku, Osaka, Japan, established in 1950.
