= West Nile Bank Front =

Ugandan rebel group

- Leaders: Juma Oris (chief commander); Abdulatif Tiyua (deputy commander)
- Dates active: 1988 – c. 1997
- Split from: Uganda People's Democratic Army
- Headquarters: Morobo (until 1997)
- Active regions: Northern Uganda, southern Sudan, northeastern DR Congo
- Size: 6,083

The West Nile Bank Front (WNBF) was a Ugandan rebel group under the command of Juma Oris.

== History ==
Formed by ex-Uganda Army soldiers who remained loyal to Idi Amin, the group's exact foundation is unclear. Its first reported activity was in 1988. It became active as a proper insurgent force from 1994. However, one ex-fighter of the group stated that the WNBF was founded in 1995. It appears to have been a West Nile offshoot of the Uganda People's Democratic Army and recruited primarily in Koboko County, Arua and Obongi, Moyo. One prominent associate of the WNBF was Isaac Lumago.

It was active through the end of the First Congo War in 1997, fighting from Sudan and the Democratic Republic of Congo against the Uganda People's Defense Force. The WNBF worked at destabilizing northern Uganda. It was responsible for many kidnappings and violent raids, and had goals and tactics similar to the Lord's Resistance Army. While it had initially recruited with promises of generous pay, which proved to be false, it eventually turned to forced recruitment to replenish its ranks. The brutal tactics of the WNBF, including the laying of landmines, made it lose popular support in the region. They were in competition for popular support with the rebel Uganda National Rescue Front II that was operating in the same region simultaneously.

The fortunes of the WNBF did not really change until UPDF Major General Katumba Wamala arrived in 1996 and initiated a policy of civil-military cooperation. He has stated:

Seeing that the people didn’t support the war, my approach was to reach out to them and deny the enemy fertile ground to work on. So I had to combine a military approach with a political strategy... Rather than just sitting in the barracks, I decided to go out and spend time with the communities to work on calling the rebels back. It was very important that we never mistreated reporters (people who reported on rebel activity), so we built up trust.^{1}

By working through local and traditional authority structures and enforcing a measured approach to the counter-insurgency, Wamala earned the trust of much of the populace and was able to arrange for numerous rebels to return to their former lives. This soft initiative was coupled by military pressure upon WNBF bases in Southern Sudan by the Uganda-backed Sudan People's Liberation Army. Amid Operation Thunderbolt (1997), the last WNBF bases in Sudan were destroyed in a major battle at Kaya in which the SPLA, UPDF and several Congolese armed groups took part. Its leader Juma Oris was wounded, and the group splintered. By late 1997, the WNBF was no longer capable of significant activity.
