= Moyo Town =

Town in Uganda

Moyo
- Location in Uganda
- Coordinates: 03°39′18″N 31°43′12″E
- Country: Uganda
- Region: Northern Uganda
- Sub-region: West Nile sub-region
- District: Moyo District
- Elevation: 2,966 ft (904 m)

Population (2020 Estimate)
  - Total: 12,100

Moyo, is the main municipal, administrative, and commercial center of Moyo District in the Northern Region of Uganda. The district headquarters are located here.

== Location ==
The town of Moyo is located approximately 158 kilometres (98 mi), by road, northeast of Arua, the largest city in the West Nile sub-region. This is about 155 kilometres (96 mi) northwest of Gulu, the largest city in the Northern Region of Uganda.

Moyo lies approximately 485 kilometres (301 mi) northwest of Kampala, the capital and largest city of Uganda. The coordinates of Moyo Town are 3°39'18.0"N, 31°43'12.0"E (Latitude:3.654989; Longitude:31.720006). Moyo Town Council sits at an average elevation of 904 metres (2,966 ft) above mean sea level.

== Population ==
In 2015, Uganda Bureau of Statistics (UBOS) estimated the population of the town at 10,700. In 2020, the population agency estimated the mid-year population of the town at 12,100 people. Of these, 6,300 (52.1 percent) were female and 5,800 (47.9 percent) were male. UBOS calculated the population growth rate of Moyo town to average 2.49 percent annually, between 2015 and 2020.

Historical population
Year	Pop.	±%
2015	10,700	—
2020	12,100	+13.1%

== Points of interest ==
The following points of interest are located in Moyo town or close to the town:

1. The headquarters of Moyo District Administration

2. The offices of Moyo Town Council

3. Moyo Airport, a civilian airport administered by the Civil Aviation Authority of Uganda.

4. Moyo Central Market

5. Koboko–Yumbe–Moyo Road makes a T-junction with the Atiak–Adjumani–Moyo–Afoji Road in the middle of town.

6. Moyo General Hospital, a 176-bed public hospital administered by the Uganda Ministry of Health

7. Moyo Campus of Uganda Martyrs University.

== See also ==
- List of airports in Uganda
- List of cities and towns in Uganda
- Moyo Water Supply and Sanitation System
