= Uganda National Rescue Front =

Rebel group (1980–2002)

- Leader: Moses Ali
- Military leader: Major General Ali Bamuze
- Merged into: The Uganda People's Defence Forces
- Active regions: Uganda (mainly in West Nile)
- Ideology: Idi Amin loyalism
- Status: Dissolved
- Part of: West Nile rebels

The Uganda National Rescue Front (UNRF) was a rebel group that operated in Uganda's West Nile sub-region between 1980 and 2002. The UNRF was founded by former soldiers of the Uganda Army and individuals who hailed from the West Nile region led by Major General Ali Bamuze.

The rebel group was formed as a response to the revenge killings and persecutions that were dealt on the region by members of the Uganda National Liberation Army following Idi Amin's overthrow in 1979. The last of the UNRF combatants, who had by then morphed into UNRF II, were incorporated into the Uganda People's Defence Forces on 15th June 2002 following a ceasefire agreement with the government of Uganda.

== UNRF ==
The first entity called Uganda National Rescue Front, also known as "National Salvation Front", was formed to oppose Milton Obote during his second term (1980–1985) as president of Uganda. The UNRF was composed of former supporters of Idi Amin, and headed by Brigadier Moses Ali, formerly Amin's Minister of Finance.

After the fall of Obote in July 1984/5, over 1,000 cadres of the UNRF joined Yoweri Museveni's government. Moses Ali has held various positions as a cabinet member in Museveni's government including Minister of Tourism and Wildlife, and Minister of Youth, Culture and Sport. In April 1990 he was arrested on treason charges, and incarcerated until June 1992, when he was released and acquitted. This did not prevent his appointment as Minister of Internal Affairs, Minister for Disaster Preparedness, and Deputy Prime Minister.

== UNRF II ==
UNRF II insurgency
Date	1996 – 2002
Location	Uganda
Status	Ceasefire

Belligerents
Uganda	UNRF II

Commanders and leaders
(Uganda) Yoweri Museveni	Ali Bamuze

The Uganda National Rescue Front II was a group that broke away from the West Nile Bank Front in 1996, and included members of the original UNRF that did not make peace with Museveni. It operated mostly in Aringa County, Arua District, out of bases in southern Sudan, and received support from the Sudanese government (the National Islamic Front), in retaliation for Ugandan government's support for the Sudan People's Liberation Army. It was led by Major General Ali Bamuze.

On December 24, 2002, the UNRF II signed a formal ceasefire with the government in the town of Yumbe in northwestern Uganda. The terms included a battalion of UNRF II soldiers being incorporated into the Ugandan army, and USh 4.2 billion being distributed to the group. Moses Ali is reported to have participated in the negotiations.
