= Yumbe =

- Location in Uganda
- Coordinates: 03°27′54″N 31°14′45″E
- Country: Uganda
- Region: Northern Region of Uganda
- Sub-region: West Nile sub-region
- District: Yumbe District
- Elevation: 2,966 ft (904 m)

Population (2024 Census)
  - Total: 65,882

Yumbe is a town in the Northern Region of Uganda. It is the district headquarters of Yumbe District.

== Geography ==
Yumbe is approximately 91 kilometres (57 mi), by road, northeast of Arua, the largest city in the West Nile sub-region. Yumbe is approximately 223 kilometres (139 mi), by road, northwest of Gulu, the largest city in the Northern Region of Uganda. The coordinates of the town are 3°27'54.0"N, 31°14'42.0"E (Latitude:3.465000; Longitude:31.245000) Yumbe Town Council sits at an average elevation of 904 metres (2,966 ft) above mean sea level.

== Population ==
The 2002 national census enumerated the population of Yumbe Town Council at 15,401. The 2014 national census and household survey put the population of the town at 34,806 inhabitants. In 2020, the Uganda Bureau of Statistics (UBOS) estimated the mid-year population of Yumbe Town at 47,400. UBOS calculated that the population of Yumbe Town Council increased at an average annual rate of 5.5 percent, between 2014 and 2020.

Historical population
| Year | Pop. | ±% |
|---|---|---|
| 2002 | 15,401 | — |
| 2014 | 34,806 | +126.0% |
| 2020 | 47,400 | +36.2% |

== Points of interest ==
The following points of interest lie within the town or near the town limits: (a) the offices of Yumbe Town Council (b) the headquarters of Yumbe District Administration and (c) Yumbe Central Market, the source of daily fresh produce.

Yumbe General Hospital, a 100-bed public hospital administered by the Uganda Ministry of Health, was upgraded to a referral hospital in January 2021, following renovations.

The Koboko–Yumbe–Moyo Road passes through Yumbe Town, in a general southwest to northeast direction. In 2020, the International Development Association (IDA), a member of the World Bank Group provided a grant of US$130.8 million to upgrade this road to class II bitumen surface, with shoulders, culverts and drainage channels.

== See also ==
- West Nile sub-region
- List of cities and towns in Uganda
