= Yumbe District =

- District
- District location in Uganda
- Coordinates: 03°28′N 31°15′E
- Country: Uganda
- Region: Northern Uganda
- Sub-region: West Nile sub-region
- Capital: Yumbe

Area
  - Total: 2,393 km^{2} (924 sq mi)

Population (2012 Estimate)
  - Total: 545,500
  - Density: 228/km^{2} (590/sq mi)
- Time zone: UTC+3 (EAT)
- Website: web.archive.org/web/20090411041051/http://www.yumbe.go.ug:80/

Yumbe District is a district in Northern Region, Uganda. Like most other Ugandan districts, it is named after its 'chief town', Yumbe, where the district headquarters are located.

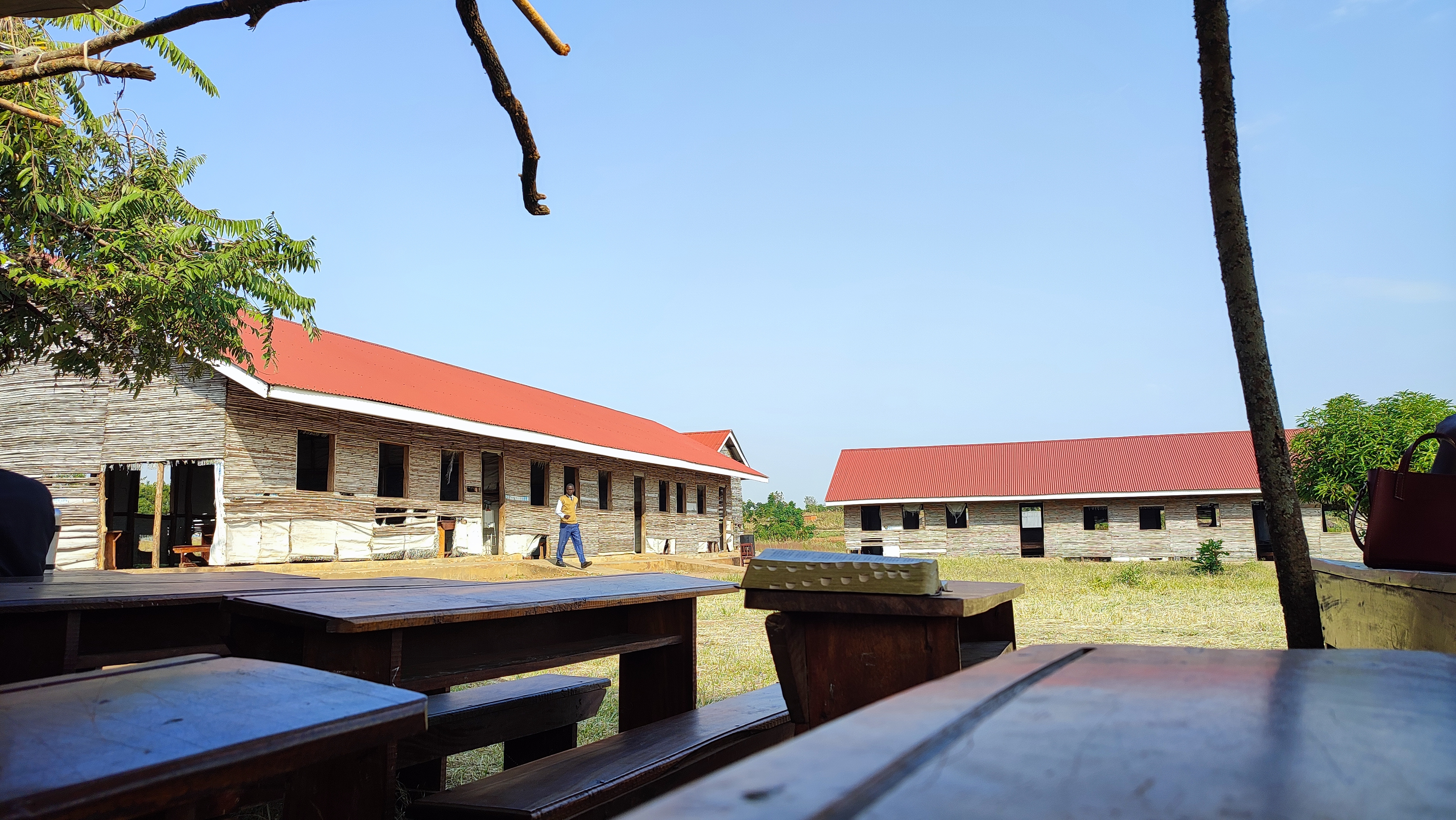
Yangani Progressive Primary School is a school located in the Bidibidi refugee settlement, Yumbe district.

== Location ==
Yumbe District is one of Uganda's most northern districts. The district is bordered by South Sudan to the north, Moyo District to the east, Adjumani District to the southeast, Arua District to the south, Maracha District to the southwest and Koboko District to the west. The district headquarters at Yumbe are located approximately 75 kilometres (47 mi), by road, north of Arua, the largest town in the sub-region.

== Overview ==
Yumbe District was established in 2006 when Aringa County was split off Arua District and renamed Yumbe District.The people in the district are still suffering from the effects of the civil war, which lasted about twenty years (1980–2000). The peace agreement between UNRF2 and the Government of Uganda was signed in the year 2000 in Yumbe.

The majority (89%) ethnicity in the district are Lugbara. The dialects spoken in the district include Aringa Lugbara (majority). Other ethnicities include the Kakwa, Madi and the Alur. The other spoken languages are English and Kiswahili. The Acholi are scattered along River Nile and mainly engage in fishing and hunting, along the river. They account for about 2% of the district's population.

== Geography and environment ==
Yumbe District lies within the Albert Nile catchment system.One of its major rivers is the River Kochi, which originates in Koboko District and flows through Yumbe before joining the Albert Nile in Moyo District.The Kochi River catchment is one of the twelve sub-catchments that form the Albert Nile catchment in the upper Nile water management zone. The river plays an important role in supporting irrigation, domestic water supply, and local ecosystems.

However, the catchment has experienced significant environmental degradation due to human activities such as:

- Charcoal burning
- Brick making
- Clearing of vegetation for agriculture and settlement

These activities have led to loss of tree cover and increased pressure on wetlands and riverbanks.

In response, the ministry of water and Environment, with support from the world Bank, is implementing restoration efforts under the integrated Water Management and development project.The project focuses on ecosystem restoration, soil and water conservation, and sustainable livelihoods within the Kochi River sub- catchment.

== Population ==
Yumbe is the only district in the country with a mainly Muslim majority population (76%), which is an exception for a Ugandan district, where 85% of the population is Christians. The fertility rate in the district is high (7.5).

In 1991, the national population census estimated the district population at about 99,800. The 2002 national census estimated the population of the district at about 251,800 inhabitants. The annual population growth rate in Yumbe District was calculated at 8.2%. It was estimated that the population of Yumbe District in 2012 was approximately 545,500. In 2024, the population was 951,400 people in 153,061 households.

== Religion ==
Majority of the people in Yumbe district are Muslims faith by denomination though there are Christians which are less in number compared to the Muslims.

== Transportation ==
Road transport.

=== River in Yumbe District ===
==== River Kochi ====
A river that supplies water for irrigation and household use in Yumbe District. The Kochi River originates in Koboko District, flows through Yumbe District, and enters the Albert Nile in Moyo District. The Kochi River catchment area is one of 12 sub-catchments that make up the Albert Nile Catchment. The catchment area has been degraded by charcoal burning, brick making, and vegetation clearing for agriculture and house construction. The Ministry of Water and Environment is implementing a project to restore 264 kilometers of the Kochi River with funding from the World Bank.

== Economic activities ==
Subsistence agriculture is the main economic activity in the district, as is the case with most Ugandan districts. Crops grown include the following:

- Millet
- Sweet potatoes
- Beans
- Cassava
- Tobacco
- Tomatoes
- Papaya
- Avocado
- Mangos
- Oranges
- Lemons
- Onions
- Cabbage

== Livestocks ==
- Goat
- Sheep
- Cattle
- Poultry
- Donkeys

== See also ==
- Arua city
- The Lugbara
- Yumbe
- West Nile
- Northern Uganda
- Uganda Districts
- Lugbara cuisine
