= Moyo District =

- District
- District location in Uganda
- Coordinates: 03°39′N 31°43′E
- Country: Uganda
- Region: Northern Uganda
- Sub-region: West Nile sub-region
- Capital: Moyo

Area
  - Total: 1,800.8 km^{2} (695.3 sq mi)

Population (2014 Estimate)
  - Total: 194,734
  - Density: 229.1/km^{2} (593/sq mi)
- Time zone: UTC+3 (EAT)
- Website: www.moyo.go.ug

Moyo District is a district in Northern Region of Uganda. Like many other Ugandan districts, it is named after its "chief town", Moyo, where the district headquarters are located.

== Location ==
Moyo District is located in Uganda's extreme north, in the West Nile sub-region. The district is bordered by South Sudan to the north and east, Adjumani District to the south, across the waters of the White Nile, and Yumbe District to the west. The South Sudanese state of Central Equatoria and Eastern Equatoria form the northern border, and a road runs from Moyo to the town of Kajo Keji in Central Equatoria. The district headquarters at Moyo, are located approximately 158 kilometres (98 mi), by road, northeast of Arua, the largest city in the sub-region. This location lies approximately 476 kilometres (296 mi), by road, northwest of Kampala, Uganda's capital and largest city. The coordinates of the district are:03 39N, 31 43E (Latitude:3.6500; Longitude:31.7190).

== Overview ==
In recent years the district has stagnated in isolation as the Second Sudanese Civil War raged to the north and the insurgency of the Lord's Resistance Army made the direct road south to the national capital of Kampala perilous. The district has hosted a large number of South Sudanese refugees who fled the fighting in their country. The 2005 Sudanese peace agreement and reduced activities of the LRA have raised hopes that Moyo District will again become the prosperous transit area for cross-border trade that it once was.

== Population ==
The 1991 census estimated the population of the district at about 79,400. The population of Moyo District according to the 2002 national census was about 194,800, of whom 48.8% were females and 51.2% were males. In the first decade of the 2000s, Moyo District experienced rapid population growth, primarily from refugees fleeing war in South Sudan. It is estimated that the annual population growth rate in the district has averaged 7.9%, between 2002 and 2012. It is estimated that the population of the district in 2012, was approximately 412,500.

== Economic activities ==
Like in most other Ugandan districts, agriculture forms the backbone of the district economy. Over 90% of the district population are involved in agricultural activities, with 86.6% of the population involved in some form of subsistence production. Most agricultural production is for household consumption. Some of the agricultural produce is sold, particularly maize, cassava and simsim.

The main crops grown in the district include:

- Sweet potatoes
- Sorghum
- Cassava
- Simsim
- Groundnuts
- Millet
- Maize
- Peas
- Beans

The Nile Rivere is the main source of fishing within the district. Some cattle, goats and chicken are kept, mostly on a subsistence level. Bee keeping, for honey production, is gaining popularity in the district.

== Livestock ==
- Cattle
- sheep
- Goat
- Chicken

== See also ==
- Moyo Town
- West Nile
- Northern Uganda
- Uganda Districts
- Parliament of Uganda
