= List of refugee settlements in Uganda =

Uganda is one of the largest refugee-hosting nations in the world, with roughly 1.95 million refugees by October 2025. Most of the refugees in Uganda come from neighboring countries such as South Sudan and the Democratic Republic of the Congo due to the economic and political instability. Uganda's policies provide rights to the refugees such as the rights to education, work, own private property, healthcare and other basic social services.

== Statistics ==
Almost 50% of refugees in Uganda are located in the Bidi Bidi, Pagirinya, and Rhino refugee settlement camps, located in the northwest region of the country.

South Sudan is the origin of 62% of refugees in Uganda, and 29% are from the Democratic Republic of the Congo.

== List of refugee settlements in Uganda ==
Name	District	Number of Refugees	Approx. Size
Achol-Pii Refugee Settlement	Agago		
Bidi Bidi Refugee Settlement	Yumbe	224 048 (July 2022)	
Imvepi Refugee Settlement	Terego District	67,439	
Kiryandongo Refugee Settlement	Kiryandongo		
Kyaka II Refugee Settlement	Kyegegwa District		
Nakivale Refugee Settlement	Isingiro	35,000	
Palorinya Refugee Settlement	Moyo District		
Rhino Camp Refugee Settlement	Madi-Okollo and Terego	145,820	225 km^{2}
Rhino Camp Extension Refugee settlement	Terego District		
Rwamwanja Refugee Settlement	Kamwenge	70,000	
Kyangwali Refugee Settlement	Kikuube District	125,039	
Kampala Refugee Settlement	Kampala		
Nyumanzi Refugee settlement	Adjumani		
Agojo Refugee settlement	Adjumani		
Ayilo I Refugee settlement	Adjumani		
Ayilo II Refugee settlement	Adjumani		
Alere 2 Refugee settlement	Adjumani		
Baratuku Refugee settlement	Adjumani		
Boroli Refugee settlement	Adjumani		
Elema Refugee settlement	Adjumani		
Maaji I Refugee settlement	Adjumani		
Maaji II Refugee settlement	Adjumani		
Maaji III Refugee settlement	Adjumani		
Mirieyi Refugee settlement	Adjumani		
Mungula Refugee settlement	Adjumani		
Mungula II Refugee settlement	Adjumani		
Oliji Refugee settlement	Adjumani		
Olua I Refugee settlement	Adjumani		
Olua II Refugee settlement	Adjumani		
Pagrinya Refugee settlement	Adjumani		
Lobule Refugee settlement	Koboko	5,953	(5.9K)
Oruchinga Refugee settlement	Isingiro		
Palabek Refugee settlement	Lamwo		
Kyaka II Refugee settlement	Kyegegwa		
Adjumani Refugee Settlement	Adjumani		

== See also ==
- Refugees in Uganda
- Sexual exploitation of refugees in Uganda
