= Rhino Camp Extension Refugee settlement =

Rhino Camp Extension Refugee settlement is a refugee camp located in Omugo Zone in Arua District in Uganda. It is also known as Rhino Refugee camp - Omugo zone Extension. It hosts over 43,000 refugees. It is located next to the Imvepi Refugee Settlement .

== Background and geography ==
Rhino Refugee camp - Omugo zone Extension was created in August 2017 to accommodate the increasing numbers of the South Sudanese asylum seekers. When refugees arrive in the camp, they are given plots of 50 x 50 metres.

Omugo zone extension is divided into six villages which are; Omugo one, Omugo two, Omugo three, Omugo four, Omugo five, Omugo six, Omugo 2 extension.

== Organisations operating in the camp ==
- United Nations High Commissioner for Refugees
- Humanity and Inclusion: It supports vulnerable and disabled South Sudanese refugees in Uganda.
- PALM Corps: Helps to improve agricultural production practices, marketing of the agricultural produce, increase income through selling collectively and also civic participation.
- World Food Programme

== Accessibility to services by the refugees ==
=== Education ===
The camp has overcrowded classrooms, fewer teachers, there is an increased number of school drop outs for the girls, some refugees do not understanding the local languages such as Lugbara that other students are usually taught in since they come from neighbouring countries.

=== Health ===
There are few medical personnel to attend to patients, health centres are located in distant places, medicines are not enough and also there is no emergency medical support.

=== Shelter ===
Some of the refugees are given tarpaulins upon arrival at the camp but those trapaulins later tear and start to leak hence the need to replace them.

=== Water and sanitation ===
The camp has fewer water sources such as bore holes, water tanks. There are often long queues at the water access points.

=== Farming and agriculture ===
Some of the land in the camp is infertile soils to support agriculture which leads to refugees begging for food to add to the monthly food distributed to them.

== Read also ==
- Rhino Camp Refugee Settlement
- List of Refugee settlements in Uganda
