= Ayilo 1 Refugee settlement =

- Refugee camp
- Location within Uganda
- Coordinates: 3°17′52″N 31°57′12″E
- Country: Uganda
- Region: Northern Region
- District: Adjumani

Ayilo 1 refugee settlement is a prominent refugee camp located in Adjumani District, situated in the Northern Region of Uganda.

== Background ==
Ayilo I Refugee Settlement is located in Adjumani District, Northern Uganda. Established on 6 July 2014, it was created in response to the influx of South Sudanese refugees fleeing insecurity due to the South Sudan Civil War of 2013 and as well as those who fled the Country in the 1990s, who were not able to return home and chose to stay in Uganda. Ayilo I and Ayilo II, spanning 776 hectares, no longer accept new arrivals but collectively host 39,000 refugees as of 2019. The settlement's structures and distribution can be observed through maps available as of March 1, 2018. Ayilo I Refugee Settlement plays a crucial role in providing refuge and support to displaced populations in the region.

== Geography ==
Ayilo 1 refugee settlement, along with Ayilo 2 refugee camp, spans a total of 776 hectares and accommodates a combined population of 39,000 refugees of South Sudanese origin.

== Food and nutrition ==
According to The Observer news findings and research, the refugees at Ayilo 1 refugee camp resorted to selling food rations in order to meet basic needs, such as soap, salt, and clothing, which can have negative consequences for the refugees at Ayilo 1 refugee camp. While this may provide immediate relief, it is not a sustainable solution in the long run. It would be beneficial for the refugees to explore alternative options to address their needs, such as seeking assistance from humanitarian organizations, NGOs, or local authorities. These entities may be able to provide additional support and resources to ensure that the refugees have access to essentials without having to resort to selling their food rations.

== Healthcare ==
According to the Arizona State University, the healthcare center at Ayilo 1 refugee camp has the capacity to accommodate the increasing number of patients seeking medical attention. The center comprises block structures that cater to both refugees and nationals, including host communities. This integrated approach has proven effective in prioritizing the health of all individuals involved.

== Water and sanitation ==
Ayilo 1 Refugee Settlement Piped Water Supply System through the Ministry of Water and Environment of Uganda in Adjumani District is underway to provide water services to the refugees who are in dire need for these services as a way to promote the health and sanitation at the camp since the sanitation and water services were at a high risk of posing diseases and infections.

== See also ==
- List of Refugee settlements in Uganda
