= Agojo refugee settlement =

Refugee camp in Uganda

Coordinates: 3.410°N 31.739°E

The Agojo refugee settlement is a refugee camp in the Adjumani District of Northern Uganda, opened in 2016 in response to an influx of South Sudanese refugees fleeing the insecurity in their country. It is located 16 kilometres (10 mi) west of the town of Adjumani.

== Background ==
Agojo refugee settlement was opened in 2016 to reduce on crowding in Nyumanzi transit center (Nyumanzi refugee settlement).

== Education ==
Agojo refugee settlement has limited educational opportunities. Refugees pay high tuition fees which many cannot afford, exacerbated by insufficient scholarships and vocational training opportunities. Parents often sell their food rations to supplement school fees.

== Water and health ==
Agojo refugee settlement has limited water availability, with refugees being able to fill only up two jerry cans per day. The amount of water transported in has decreased, and only one borehole is operational, with no piped water system. This leads refugees to walk long distances to access potable water in the nearby communities where they have to pay or risk tensions with the locals. Moreover, the water is of poor quality.

Access to health services is also limited for both the refugees and the host community, due to the long distance to the health center operating outside the settlement, with refugees traveling up to 6 kilometres (3.7 mi) to reach the facility.
