= Palabek Refugee Settlement =

Refugee camp in Uganda

Palabek Refugee Settlement is a refugee camp located across the border from South Sudan in Lamwo District, Northern Uganda.

== Background ==
Palabek refugee settlement is one of the newest refugee settlements in Uganda officially set up in April 2016 to reduce congestion in larger refugee camps in the northwestern corner of Uganda. hosting over 50,000 refugees primarily from South Sudan with 85% of arrivals composing of women and children according to the Nations Development Programme Human Development Report.

== Gender and equality ==
Women and girls face the challenge of high sexual gender-based violence (SGBV) in the region. In particular, a cultural taboo around menstruation can lead girls to drop out or skip school, further limiting their economic and educational opportunities. There is also an increased risk of child marriage, abuse, and teen pregnancy amongst young girls.

== Games and sports ==
Palabek refugee camp has a women's netball team who play with a makeshift netball and hoops.

== Education ==
Palabek refugee settlement has 11 primary schools, secondary and technical schools serving more than 25,000 school-age refugee children and older youth who are given a chance to learn and apply their skills in a later time of their lives.

== See also ==
- Rhino Camp Refugee Settlement
- Sexual exploitation of refugees in Uganda
- Lord's Resistance Army insurgency (1994–2002)
- Onduparaka FC
