= Joanne Aniku Okia =

Female Ugandan politician

Okia Joanne Aniku

Member of Parliament of Uganda
- Incumbent
- Assumed office 2021

District Woman Representative Madi-Okollo
- Incumbent
- Assumed office 2021

Member of Parliament of Uganda from Madi-Okollo
- In office 2021–2026

Personal details
- Party: National Resistance Movement (NRM)

Joanne Aniku Okia (born 2 September 1976) is a Ugandan politician in the National Resistance Movement Party. She is the first woman member of parliament for Madi Okollo District and won the parliamentary seat unopposed in the 2021 Ugandan general election.

Okia contributed to the resolution of a long-standing border conflict between Madi Okollo District and Terego District standing out as Ugandan politician.

== See also ==
- Parliament of Uganda
- National Resistance Movement
- Madi Okollo District
- 11th Parliament of Uganda
