= Nyumanzi Refugee Settlement =

- Refugee settlement
- Location within Uganda
- Coordinates: 3°28′06″N 31°56′33″E
- Country: Uganda
- Region: West Nile
- District: Adjumani District
- Established: 2014

Area
  - Total: 4.879 km^{2} (1.884 sq mi)

Population (January 2025)
  - Total: 47,342
  - Density: 9,703/km^{2} (25,130/sq mi)
- Managed by: Office of the Prime Minister (Uganda), UNHCR and partners

Nyumanzi Refugee Settlement is a refugee camp in Adjumani District in northwestern Uganda. Established in 2014, it hosts about 52,000 South Sudanese refugees.

== Background ==
After opening in January 2014, Nyumanzi has become the largest refugee settlement in Adjumani district in terms of population size of approximately 43,000 men, women, and children.

Nyumanzi refugee settlement is largely populated by refugees from South Sudan of mainly the Dinka tribe. Nyumanzi refugee settlement is home to more than 20,000 long-term refugees displaced by the conflict in South Sudan.

239,335 refugees from South Sudan are being hosted in refugee settlements in Adjumani District.

== Healthcare services ==
The settlement is served by one government-run Health Centre III and various private health facilities owned by refugees and nationals.

== Education ==
Nyumanzi refugee settlement though being the largest in Adjumani District has only 6 schools in total with three being primary schools and the rest preschools, where more than 4,000 children go everyday, these schools where all established by the Building Tomorrow one NGO that has greatly being supporting Education in Adjumani and part of South Sudan.

The settlement also has 1 secondary school and 1 technical school, run by Windle Trust (now Windle International Uganda) and Norwegian Refugees Council respectively.

== Water and sanitation ==
In August 2014, Lutheran World Federation signed an agreement with UNICEF, aimed at reducing waterborne disease and supply strains.

== Population ==
UNHCR’s refugee response monitoring (June 2018) reported 52,894 registered refugees in Nyumanzi, with the settlement first established in 2014. Administrative refugee statistics for Adjumani (31 March 2022) reported 49,662 individuals (5,066 households) in Nyumanzi (Level 3 zone). By January 2025, Nyumanzi was reported to host 47,342 refugees, primarily from South Sudan.

Nyumanzi’s refugee population is reported as predominantly South Sudanese, with many described as Dinka, while the surrounding host community is mainly Madi.

== Violence in the settlement ==
In December 2019, a violent clash occurred between the refugees and the host tribe which left 2 refugees dead, many injured and an unknown number of the host tribesmen seriously injured. This was sparked by claims that a local Ma'di businessman was killed by refugees.

But, as the settlement is mainly occupied by the Dinka tribe, there are very few cases of violence in the camp among the refugees

== See also ==
- Refugees in Uganda
- Adjumani District
- Oruchinga Refugee Settlement
