= Sexual exploitation of refugees in Uganda =

Human rights issue in Uganda

Reports and studies from 2002 onward have documented persistent sexual exploitation and abuse of refugees in Uganda, affecting mainly women and girls and, in some cases, boys. Findings show that abuse has been carried out by a range of actors, including aid workers, officials, community members, transport operators and other refugees. Investigations have also uncovered cases in which girls were drawn into prostitution through informal networks. Research consistently highlights that risks are present across multiple forms of assistance, particularly food and shelter distribution, and that weak reporting mechanisms, fear of retaliation and the normalization of violence often prevent survivors from coming forward. Women and girls in vulnerable situations, including unaccompanied adolescents, widows, single women and persons with specific needs, have been identified as especially at risk. Underlying factors contributing to violence included poverty, substance abuse and discriminatory gender norms that normalized violence, including the use of physical punishment as “discipline”.

== Background ==
Uganda hosts one of the world’s largest refugee populations and is known for a model based on open borders, land allocation and access to work and public services. By October 2025, the country had taken in roughly 1.95 million refugees, largely rural groups mainly from South Sudan and the Democratic Republic of the Congo. The other refugees in Uganda come from Ethiopia, Somalia, Eritrea, Burundi, Rwanda, and, since 2023, Sudan.

== History ==
A 2002 assessment by UNHCR and Save the Children revealed widespread sexual exploitation and abuse committed by members of the international humanitarian community against refugee populations. Subsequent efforts to address the issue have largely centred on reporting mechanisms and disciplinary action, but researchers argue that equal attention is needed to identifying environmental and situational risks and taking preventive measures developed together with affected communities.

A 2012 survey by the Pan African Development Education and Advocacy Programme, led by country director Michael Mafabi, documented ongoing sexual harassment and physical abuse in several Ugandan refugee settlements, affecting mainly women and girls as well as some boys aged 14 to 25. The survey found that about 70 percent of women had experienced some form of violence and that roughly 45 percent had been subjected to sexual abuse. Mafabi explained that many victims did not report these incidents because the perpetrators were often individuals responsible for distributing relief assistance and therefore held power over them, and that those who attempted to report abuse were sometimes harassed in return for services.

A 2018 Newsweek article reported that refugee girls, some as young as seventeen, were being drawn into prostitution in Uganda. The investigation described a covert network that advertised refugee women and girls to clients, including officials, and noted that some journalists posing as buyers were offered minors and young women. The exploitation involved both individuals within refugee communities who acted as pimps and officials who used their authority to pressure young female refugees into sex in exchange for assistance or opportunities for relocation.

A 2020 study done with South Sudanese women and girls living as refugees in northwest Uganda found widespread fear of sexual exploitation and abuse among refugee women and girls, who described such risks as a constant part of life in the settlements. Over a three month study period, sexual exploitation and abuse occurred at all points where women and girls sought assistance. It was most frequently linked to food distributions and shelter, but it also took place when accessing water and sanitation services or when collecting fuel and firewood. Assaults involved not only aid workers but also truck drivers, construction workers, motorcycle taxi operators, host community members and other refugees. Weak or unclear reporting systems, limited community support, the normalization of abuse and uncertainty about perpetrators all discouraged victims from seeking help. Women and girls, particularly adolescents without parental care, widows, single women and persons with specific needs, were identified as especially at risk.

== Causes ==
Ongoing conflicts have left many refugees in Uganda in long-term displacement with limited prospects, and delays in services and livelihood opportunities continue to heighten their insecurity. Women are particularly exposed, facing persistent risks of sexual abuse while trying to support themselves and their families. Traditional gender expectations limit women’s economic opportunities, and in situations of hardship families may rely on children’s labour, while adolescent girls and women can be driven into early marriage or survival sex. These vulnerabilities are reinforced by broader underlying factors, including poverty, substance abuse and discriminatory gender norms that normalised violence, including the use of physical punishment as “discipline”. High levels of school related violence and the absence of child friendly reporting mechanisms further increased risks for boys and girls. Prevention efforts were fragmented and limited in scale, and initiatives aimed at improving the social and economic position of women and girls were insufficient.

== Combating ==
In 2018, the UN Resident Coordinator in Uganda, Rosa Malango, urged the government to investigate allegations of corruption, fraud and the trafficking of refugee women and girls. She reported having written to the prime minister after receiving claims that South Sudanese girls and women were being taken from northern Ugandan refugee camps and sold back across the border, possibly with the knowledge or involvement of officials. One major donor suspended aid pending the introduction of biometric registration, and UNHCR and the World Food Programme began internal reviews in response to the corruption allegations. Malango said that the Ugandan government authorities had made promises to investigate cases.

The global Spotlight Initiative is a United Nations initiative in partnership with others to eliminate violence against women and girls. In Uganda it is implemented through partners such as Alight and UNHCR, and it supports programmes designed to prevent violence against women and girls by addressing its underlying causes. Between 2019 and 2023 it has trained nearly 900 people in Uganda in how to identify, report and reduce violence within their communities. It works to advance protective legislation, improve institutional responses, foster more equal gender norms, support women’s organisations and ensure that survivors can access crucial services.

== See also ==
- List of Refugee settlements in Uganda
- Sexual slavery

== Gallery ==
South Sudanese Take Refuge in Uganda

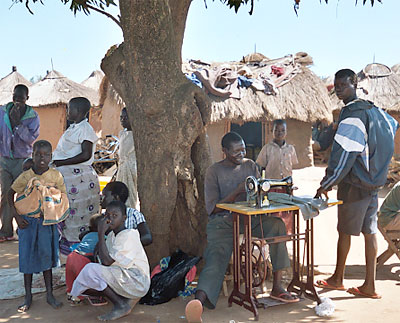
Tailor Lebuje camp, Uganda
