= Refugees in Uganda =

One of the largest refugee-hosting nations in the world

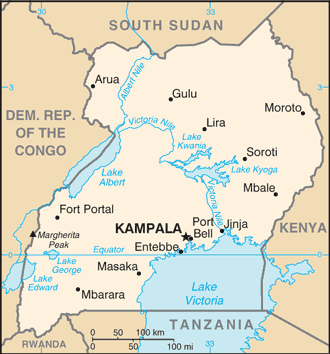
Uganda map

Uganda is one of the largest refugee-hosting nations in the world, with roughly 1.95 million refugees by October 2025. The vast influx of refugees is due to several factors such as violence and war in Uganda's neighboring countries, the Democratic Republic of the Congo, South Sudan and Sudan, and associated economic crises and political instability in the region. Uganda has relatively 'friendly' policies that provide rights to the refugees, such as rights to land, education, work, private property, healthcare and other basic social services. Although its integration policy is widely praised, the country faces severe resource constraints, with chronic underfunding and the scale of arrivals placing pressure on services. Many refugees live with limited assistance and unstable livelihoods, and the influx also affects conditions in nearby host communities.

== History ==
Uganda has experienced prolonged and repeated patterns of forced population movement, serving at different times as both a place of refuge and a source of displacement driven by conflict.

=== Colonial era displacement ===
Large scale population movements have long been a feature of the country's border regions. The establishment of the colonial boundary in 1914 marked the first time that population movements between Uganda's West Nile and southern Sudan were formally defined and regulated. Since then, domestic conflicts in both countries has repeatedly driven forced displacement, alongside regular cross border movements.

Uganda's history of receiving refugees began during the Second World War, when 7000 Polish refugees were accommodated in the country. The next influx occurred in 1955 when people began fleeing from southern Sudan into Uganda, followed by arrivals Kenya escaping the Mau Mau revolt. Large numbers of Congolese fled to Uganda amid the unrest that followed the assassination of Patrice Lumumba in 1961.

During the late 1950s and early 1960s, the arrival of tens of thousands of Tutsi refugees from Rwanda displaced by the Rwandan Revolution led to increased use of designated camps, a policy aimed at limiting political activity and promoting economic self sufficiency rather than political integration. At the same time, growing numbers of Sudanese refugees escaping violence in southern Sudan were settled in camps in northern Uganda. This period of large scale displacement eased temporarily following the Addis Ababa Peace Agreement in 1972 that ended the First Sudanese Civil War.

Uganda's early legal framework for refugees developed before independence. The Control of Refugees from the Sudan Ordinance was introduced in 1955, and was succeeded by the Control of Alien Refugees Act (CARA) in 1960. CARA adopted a restrictive, control oriented approach to displacement. It entailed mandatory settlement policies and granted camp authorities extensive powers, including the confiscation of property and the arrest, detention, and punishment of refugees, often outside established legal procedures. It largely neglected refugee protection and fell short of basic human rights standards. Still, by the late 1960s, UNHCR publicly commended Uganda's refugee model as development oriented and notably progressive in allowing refugees to work and move beyond settlement areas.

=== Reversal of refugee flows ===
The direction of displacement then reversed. After Idi Amin seized power in 1971, political violence and reprisals linked to the new regime forced many Ugandans to flee into southern Sudan. A comparable movement occurred again after Amin was removed from power in 1979. By the mid-1980s, about 7% of Uganda's population had been displaced, including roughly 200,000 Ugandan refugees in southern Sudan and tens of thousands of internally displaced people. With the outbreak of the Second Sudanese Civil War in 1983, violence in Southern Sudan intensified and security conditions deteriorated. As a result, many Ugandan refugees living in Southern Sudan returned to Uganda, while large numbers of Southern Sudanese also fled across the border into Uganda.

During this period, Uganda ratified key international refugee instruments. In 1976, it acceded to the 1951 Refugee Convention and its 1967 Protocol, albeit with several reservations, and in 1987 it ratified the 1969 OAU Convention on Refugees. Some provisions of the CARA, including strict restrictions on refugees’ freedom of movement, were inconsistent with these obligations. In practice, however, the CARA was not fully implemented. It was applied primarily in situations of mass influx, while the treatment of individual refugees was shaped in part by Uganda's regional and international commitments.

=== Protracted displacement ===
In 1986, Yoweri Museveni and the National Resistance Movement assumed power, but ongoing conflict in both Uganda and Sudan continued to drive internal displacement and cross-border refugee movements. At the height of these conflicts, more than 1.5 million Ugandans were estimated to have been displaced from their homes and living as internally displaced persons, while hundreds of thousands of Sudanese crossed the border into northern Uganda to seek asylum in the early 1990s, later settling in refugee settlements across northern and mid-western Uganda.

During the 1980s, thousands of Rwandans from the refugee population that had settled in Uganda since the 1960s joined the National Resistance Army led by Yoweri Museveni. They later shifted their focus to Rwanda. In 1990, civil war broke out in Rwanda when the Rwandan Patriotic Front, formed in Uganda and led by Paul Kagame, launched an invasion from Ugandan territory. The 1994 genocide again triggered large scale displacement into Uganda and neighbouring countries. As the former Rwandan government collapsed, many long term Tutsi refugees returned to Rwanda. Most had spent years or decades in exile, or had been born abroad, particularly in Uganda, as their repatriation had previously been blocked by the Hutu led government. The Second Congo War led to additional large scale arrivals of Congolese refugees in Uganda.

=== Refugee strategies ===
In 1999, Uganda introduced the Self Reliance Strategy (SRS) for refugees, aiming to shift refugees from dependence on humanitarian assistance toward greater economic self sufficiency and participation in development. The strategy was designed to align with and support the Poverty Eradication Action Plan, which sought to reduce mass poverty nationwide by 2017. In principle, the SRS aimed to integrate refugee services into public systems and promote self reliance by providing refugees with land and access to government health and education services, while also extending benefits to host communities. In practice, the SRS confined refugees to settlements, where they received small plots of land and initially food assistance that was gradually reduced. Refugees were expected to become self sufficient within four years, but studies in the early 2000s showed that this approach was deeply flawed. Restrictions on movement limited access to markets, while declining aid contributed to severe poverty. There was widespread food insecurity, limited access to income, inadequate land and growing conditions, and difficulties affording medicines, although primary education was generally accessible. The strategy also entailed a lack of support for host communities.

In response, many refugees bypassed the settlement system and self settled in urban and peri-urban areas, where they established local acceptance through practices such as paying taxes while remaining largely absent from national politics. Although local officials often acknowledged the economic and social contributions refugees made, their legal and political position remained insecure at the national level. In practice, the authorities and UNHCR came to equate refugee status with residence in assisted settlements, a definition that conflicted with international refugee conventions.

In 2003, the SRS was replaced by the Development Assistance for Refugee Hosting Areas policy, which sought to pursue similar goals while addressing earlier shortcomings by strengthening local capacity. However, the shift did not resolve the insecure legal status or limited assistance faced by refugees living in urban areas, who remained largely outside formal refugee policy. Continued restrictions on movement also undermined refugees’ development prospects.

=== Refugee law reform and implementation gaps ===
Around the turn of the millennium, the government moved to replace the Control of Alien Refugees Act with new legislation. The Refugee Act was first introduced in 1998 and adopted in 2006. It entered into force in 2008 and was later complemented by Refugee Regulations introduced in 2010. The new legal framework aligned Uganda's refugee definitions with international conventions, established clearer administrative and status determination procedures, and was more oriented towards human rights than its predecessor. The legislation marked a policy shift by formally recognising rights such as freedom of movement and access to work, even if these were only partially realised in practice.

Uganda's Refugees Act was regarded as "progressive, human rights and protection oriented", and the UN called Uganda one of the most welcoming countries in the world. People from any country of origin could seek protection. Refugees were granted freedom of movement, cash or food rations, the right to work and access to public services. Families were also allocated a uniform plot size of 30 by 30 metres to each household in the settlement to support agricultural livelihoods, without adjustment for household size.

In practice, however, the country lacked a unified national policy to guide its implementation, and the system suffered from prolonged underfunding. Humanitarian support continued to focus mainly on camps and largely bypassed urban refugees. Even during this comparatively favourable period, the assistance available was not adequate for many households, as the land allocation and basic support services did not fully meet the needs of larger families or those with limited capacity to cultivate their plots. These gaps in assistance forced many refugees, particularly women, to depend on informal and often precarious ways of earning an income, leaving them vulnerable to violence and exploitation.

=== Contemporary refugee policy and strains ===
Uganda hosts the largest refugee population in Africa, a situation long tied to its historically open and rights-based refugee policy. However, Uganda, for all its hospitality, faced serious difficulties in handling large inflows of refugees, particularly since 2015 when arrivals increased sharply compared with previous years. Refugees come to the country needing medical care as many are sick or injured from their journey. This has placed a lot of pressure on health officials in the country.

From late 2013, Uganda faced a sustained influx of refugees over several years as people fled South Sudan's civil war and regional violence, as limited international funding and the arrival of hundreds of thousands of people strained land, services and humanitarian assistance. The strain led to aid shortages and reduced food rations, and forced a shift from allocating farmland to providing temporary shelter for refugees and host communities.

Developments in the 2020s revealed growing strain on the system. As of April 2025, Uganda had received more than 443,000 new refugees since January 2022. International aid declined sharply, including the 2025 freeze in US assistance under Donald Trump, with annual external support falling from about $240 million to only $18 million in 2025. The arrival of large numbers of refugees, especially from South Sudan and Eritrea, contributed to rising rental costs in Kampala and surrounding areas. Reports also describe growing social tensions and economic pressure in host neighbourhoods and a call for more balanced approaches to housing and integration. Despite these pressures, public support for hosting refugees has remained strong. An IPSOS survey reported that 80 percent of Ugandans believed they benefited from the presence of refugees.

In January 2024, the Ugandan government introduced restrictions requiring Sudanese asylum seekers to register only from designated refugee settlements rather than from Kampala or other urban centres. Under this policy, new arrivals must reside in the camps to obtain refugee documentation and are expected to remain there once registered. In late 2025, Uganda halted the registration of new asylum seekers from Eritrea, Somalia, and Ethiopia. Officials motivated this decision by citing major funding shortages behind the policy change. Minister for Relief, Disaster Preparedness and Refugees Hilary Onek stated that the concerned countries were not in war. Other motivations given by government officials cited security concerns, pressure on public resources and, in the case of Eritrean applicants, efforts to curb trafficking and financial crime. They also warned that diminishing international support was placing the open door approach under pressure, with Onek arguing that the open door policy may need reassessment if external assistance continued to fall short.

== Refugee population ==
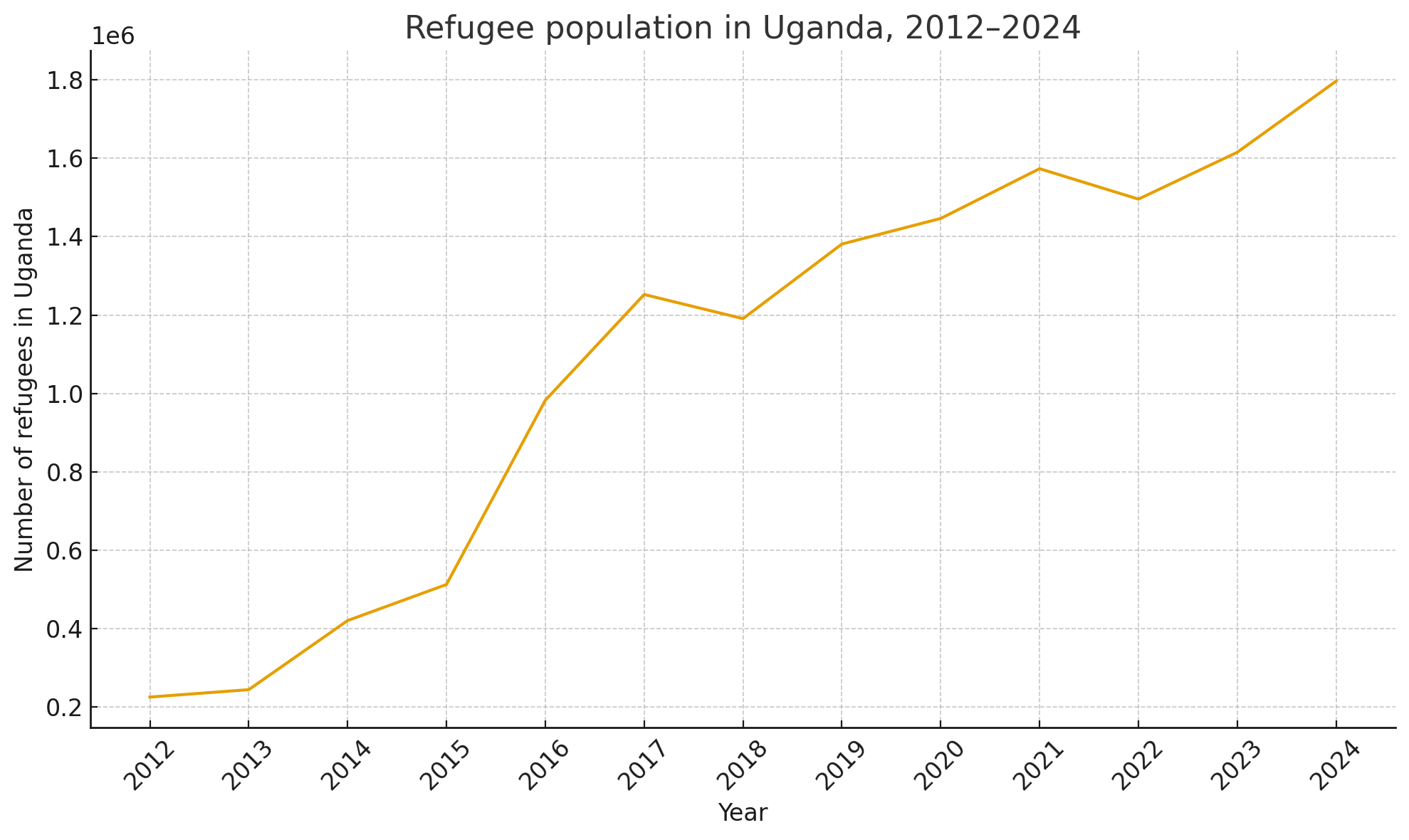
Refugee population in Uganda 2012–2024

Because of ongoing repatriation and new arrivals, both the overall refugee population and the relative share of different nationalities within it have continually changed. By 1967, Uganda had more than 160,000 refugees. By September 2000, Uganda hosted an estimated 202,000 registered refugees and 640,000 internally displaced persons. By 2006, Uganda had nearly 220,000 refugees, of whom approximately 78% were Sudanese, 11% Congolese, and 7.5% Rwandese.

The number of refugees in Uganda rose sharply from just over 200,000 in 2012–2013 to more than 1.25 million by 2017, and although the pace of increase later slowed, the total continued to grow steadily, reaching nearly 1.8 million by 2024.

Most of the refugees in Uganda come from neighboring countries, especially South Sudan and the Democratic Republic of the Congo. Uganda also has refugees from countries like Burundi, Somalia, Rwanda, Eritrea, Ethiopia, Sudan, among others.

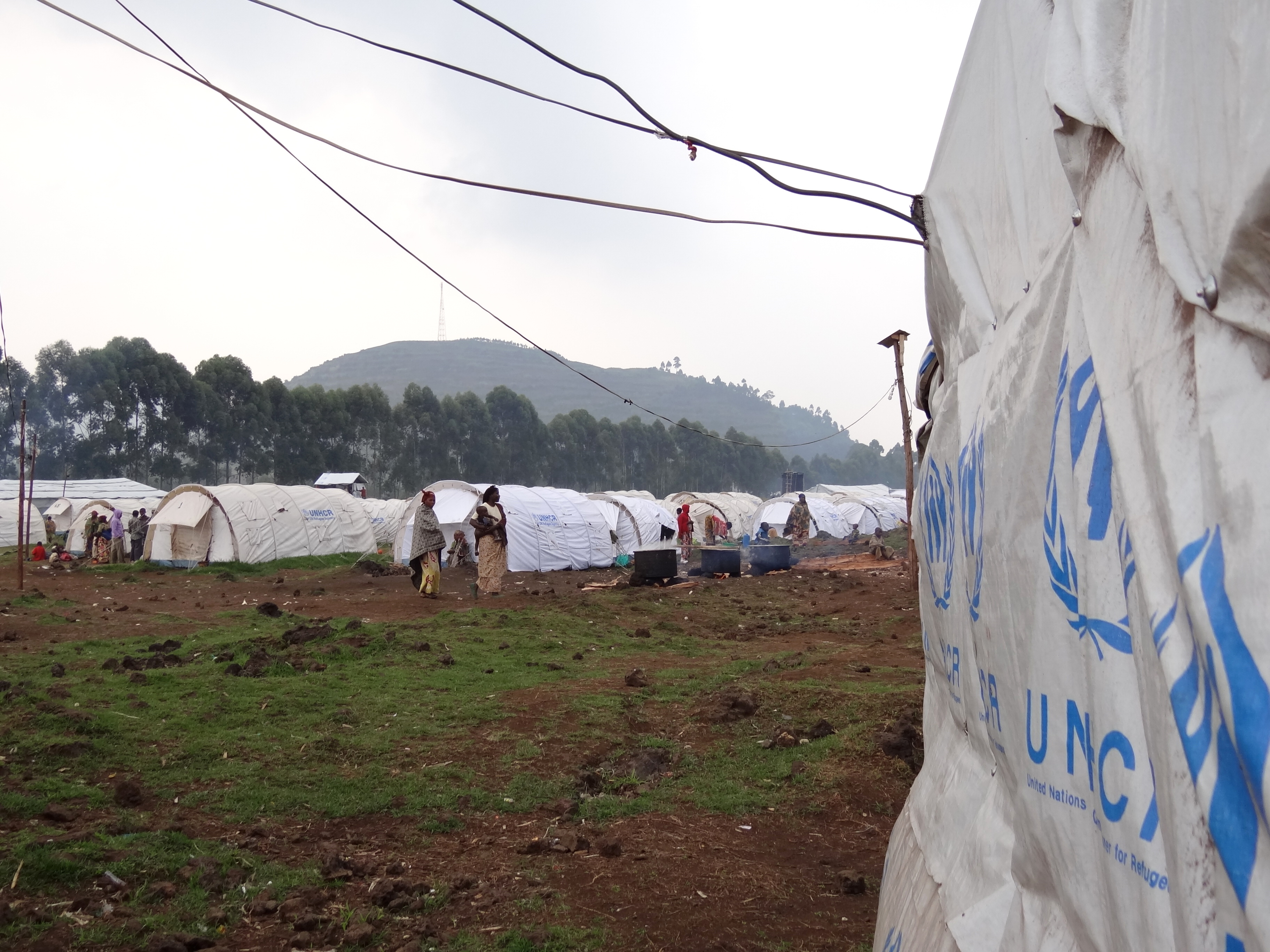
Refugee Camps in South - Western Uganda

=== Refugee settlements ===
Almost 50% of refugees in Uganda are located in the Bidibidi, Pagirinya, and Rhino refugee settlement camps, located in the northwest region of the country. Other refugee settlements in Uganda include KyakaII, Oruchinga, Kyangwali, Nakivale, Rwamwanja.

== Costs and funding ==
In 2017, Uganda was the largest refugee hosting country in Africa and the third largest in the world. This placed a huge burden on the country with a GDP per capita of about $773, while the assistance provided per refugee was limited. In spite of this burden, funding remained scarce. By the end of 2023, Uganda's refugee response remained significantly underfunded, with about 35% ($294 million) of the $846 million required under the Uganda Country Refugee Response Plan secured, leaving a funding gap of around 65%. In 2024, Rising food and fuel prices, influenced in part by global shocks including Russia's war in Ukraine, further reduced the capacity of humanitarian agencies to meet basic needs.

=== Reduction in funding ===
As of mid-2025, Uganda's refugee response was under severe strain due to a sharp decline in international funding. Cuts from major donors, including reductions linked to the suspension of USAID spending under U.S. President Trump, led to major losses in support. Officials said that UNHCR funding had dropped from $240 million to only $18 million for the year. The broader refugee response remained heavily underfunded, with only about 22% ($212 million) of the $968 million required for 2025 secured by the third quarter.

In 2025, funding was concentrated in certain priority sectors. Protection received the largest share, with about $45 million of the $223 million required, including activities related to gender-based violence and child protection. This was followed by livelihoods and resilience, which received roughly $39.5 million of a $165 million requirement. Health and nutrition received about $26 million out of $134 million needed, while food security was funded at approximately $22 million against a requirement of $163 million.

As a result of these shortfalls, assistance levels were severely constrained. Food assistance fell below eight dollars per person per month and around 60% of refugees received no rations at all. UNHCR's per capita spending in Uganda dropped from $95 in 2015 to $36 in 2025. The World Food Programme, already operating with limited resources, was no longer permitted to provide cash assistance in many situations, and its nutrition programmes could not keep up with rising needs. Malnutrition levels in refugee reception centres have risen to critical thresholds, exceeding 15%.

Health and education services began to decline quickly. Transit centres operated far beyond their intended capacity, with Nyakabande camp hosting six times the number of people it was designed for. Structured support remained minimal after transfer. Large refugee settlements such as Nakivale and Adjumani were overwhelmed, with each hosting more than 200,000 refugees. Funding gaps made the situation unsustainable, forcing donors and UN agencies to abandon longer-term livelihood and self-reliance goals in favour of basic life-saving assistance. UNHCR reduced some standard protection services, including legal aid for refugees and safe spaces for children, in order to focus on the most urgent needs.

=== Costs per sector ===
The estimated annual cost to Uganda in 2017 for hosting refugees, broken down by sector:

Sector	Value (US$)	Percentage distribution
Education	795,419	0.25
Health	5,201,026	1.61
Security	3,045,858	0.94
Land	29,746,209	9.21
Ecosystem loss	90,682,169	28.07
Energy and water	145,881,761	45.16
Other costs	2,406,814	0.75
Estimated tax exemption to UN agencies	45,254,125	14.01
Total	323,013,382	100.00

== Refugees from the Democratic Republic of the Congo ==
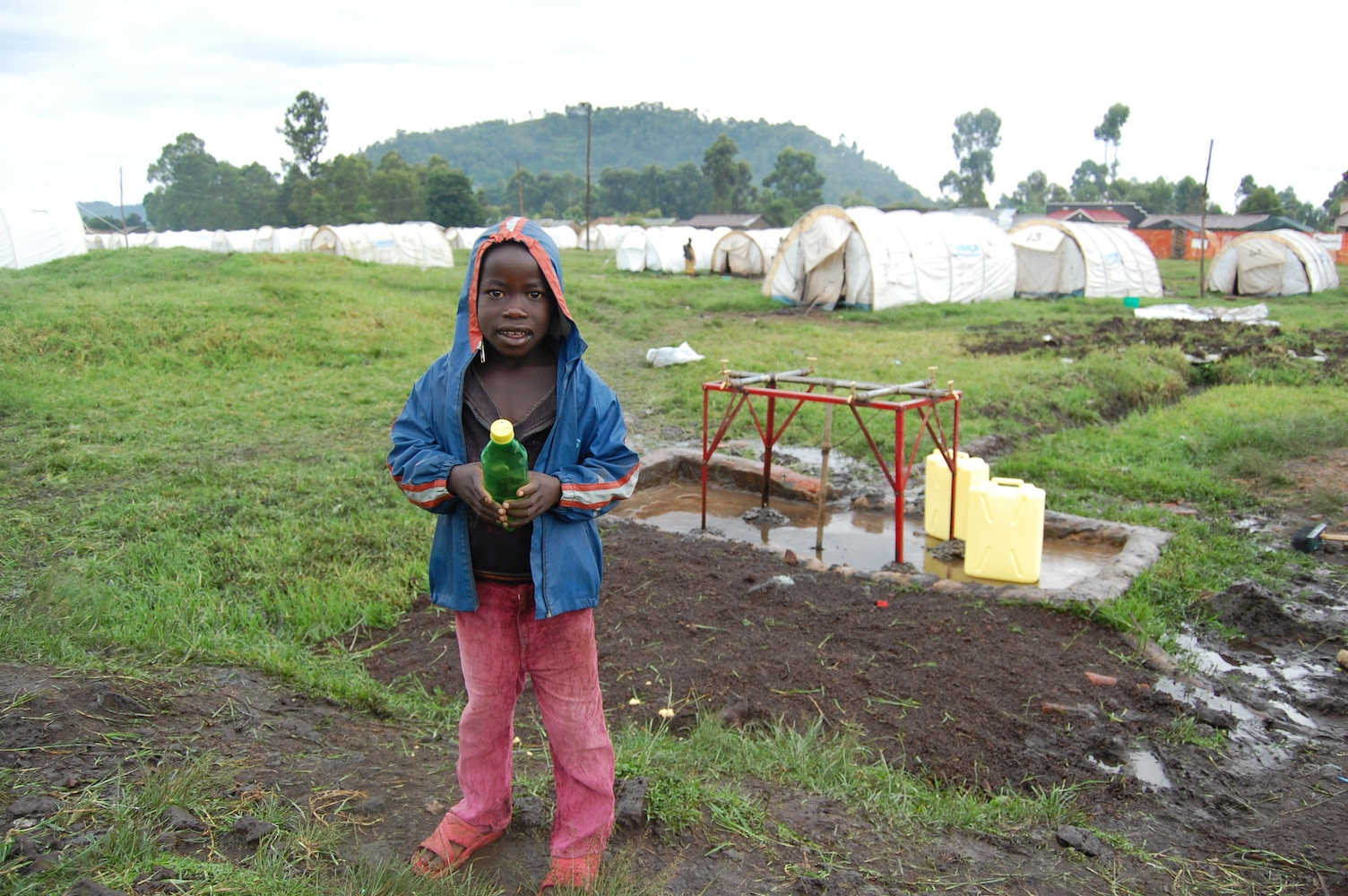
A newly arrived child refugee from DRC collecting clean drinking water in Nyakabande transit camp, 2013

The Democratic Republic of the Congo has a conflict history stretching back several decades, during which repeated outbreaks of violence have forced large numbers of people from their homes.

By April 2019, the number of Congolese refugees in Uganda had risen to more than 300,000. The vast majority of the refugees came from the part of DR Congo that bordered Uganda. The massive influx of refugees was largely caused by the persistent violence and fighting that has dominated the DR Congo. Many refugees entered Uganda through Lake Albert in DRC's Ituri province, which borders the northwest region of Uganda. Of the 900,000 refugees, almost 3% were children traveling alone; almost 2% were women at risk; and 0.2% were fleeing sexual- or gender-based violence.

The presence of refugees in Uganda has had a positive influence on the rates of consumption and access to private education in the communities that host them. This is due to increased channels of commerce in areas where more refugees are present, and the policies enforced by non-governmental organizations that allow for private education providers to be more common in areas with higher refugee populations.

=== Ebola epidemic ===
By May 2026, violence in eastern DR Congo had caused a sharp rise in the number of Congolese refugees entering Uganda. That same month, an Ebola outbreak began in DR Congo. On 28 May, Uganda shut its border with DR Congo for four weeks in an attempt to prevent the spread of Ebola.

== Refugees from South Sudan ==
Before South Sudan became an independent state in 2011, Uganda hosted refugees from the area, many of whom returned home after independence was achieved. However, following the outbreak of the civil war in South Sudan in December 2013, refugee flows resumed, and by 1 January 2014 approximately 7,580 South Sudanese had again entered Uganda, with roughly 1,000 people continuing to arrive each day. Many South Sudanese refugees arriving in Uganda were taken to the Dzaipi transit camp near the border, which, although designed for 3,000 people, became overcrowded with more than 25,000, mostly women and children, lacking adequate shelter and basic services. At that time, resources were further strained by the arrival of refugees from DR Congo following clashes between the Congolese government army and the rebel group Allied Democratic Forces.

According to the UNHCR, the number of registered South Sudanese refugees in Uganda has crossed the one million threshold as of Fall 2017. In February 2016, The UN Children's fund reported that "The transit centres are at their limits. Nyumanzi Transit Center can accommodate 3,000 persons but can be stretched to 5,000 individuals in a worst case scenario while Maaji Settlement (Adjumani) can take another 10,000 refugees." Refugees at the Kiryandongo settlement camp have taken up agriculture. The Bidi Bidi Refugee Settlement in Northwestern Uganda became the largest refugee camp in the world with five zones in early 2017, with over 270,000 refugees. Baratuku, established in 1991, has hosted successive waves of South Sudanese refugees since the Second Sudanese War. It continues to operate with, as of 2018, significant challenges in supplies and infrastructure.

== Refugees from Sudan ==
Since the start of the 2023 war in Sudan, Uganda had seen a steady rise in arrivals from Sudan. The number of new arrivals increased sharply during 2024, then decreased somewhat in 2025. By October 2025, more than 91,563 Sudanese refugees were officially registered in the country.

The influx of Sudanese refugees placed new pressures on Uganda's largely rural, land-based settlement system. The refugee population had a wide range of educational backgrounds, from highly educated individuals to those with little or no formal schooling, reflecting the diverse groups displaced by the war. Many of the new arrivals were not agricultural workers seeking land in rural settlements but urban professionals from Khartoum, Darfur and other cities, including teachers, lawyers, business owners and students. They chose to avoid rural settlements and moved directly to urban areas such as Kampala, Entebbe and Arua, where life was difficult. With no food aid, scarce employment opportunities and rising living costs, many urban refugees found themselves in a state of uncertainty, out of immediate danger, yet unable to establish stable livelihoods. The Office of the Prime Minister has discouraged expanding support for urban refugee initiatives out of concern that it could draw more refugees to cities, which has limited support for Sudanese refugees in Kampala.

== Refugees from Somalia ==
Uganda has at times served as a refuge during periods of instability in Kenya. In 1989, a citizenship screening exercise in Kenya led to the displacement of nearly 15,000 Somalis. Many of those who fled, relocated to Uganda, where they were granted temporary political asylum by the Ugandan authorities, and a large number later returned to Kenya.

By the early 2010s, Uganda experienced a sharp increase in Somali refugees, with the registered population rising from 8,239 in 2008 to 41,515 by March 2014. Most arrivals had previously sought refuge in Kenya before reapplying for asylum in Uganda, while others entered after travelling through Kenya from Somalia and sought refugee status for the first time. The rise in arrivals to Uganda was driven by increased pressure on refugees in Kenya, Uganda's comparatively rights oriented refugee framework, and easier access to regional economic opportunities, including travel to and from Somalia.

== Challenges ==
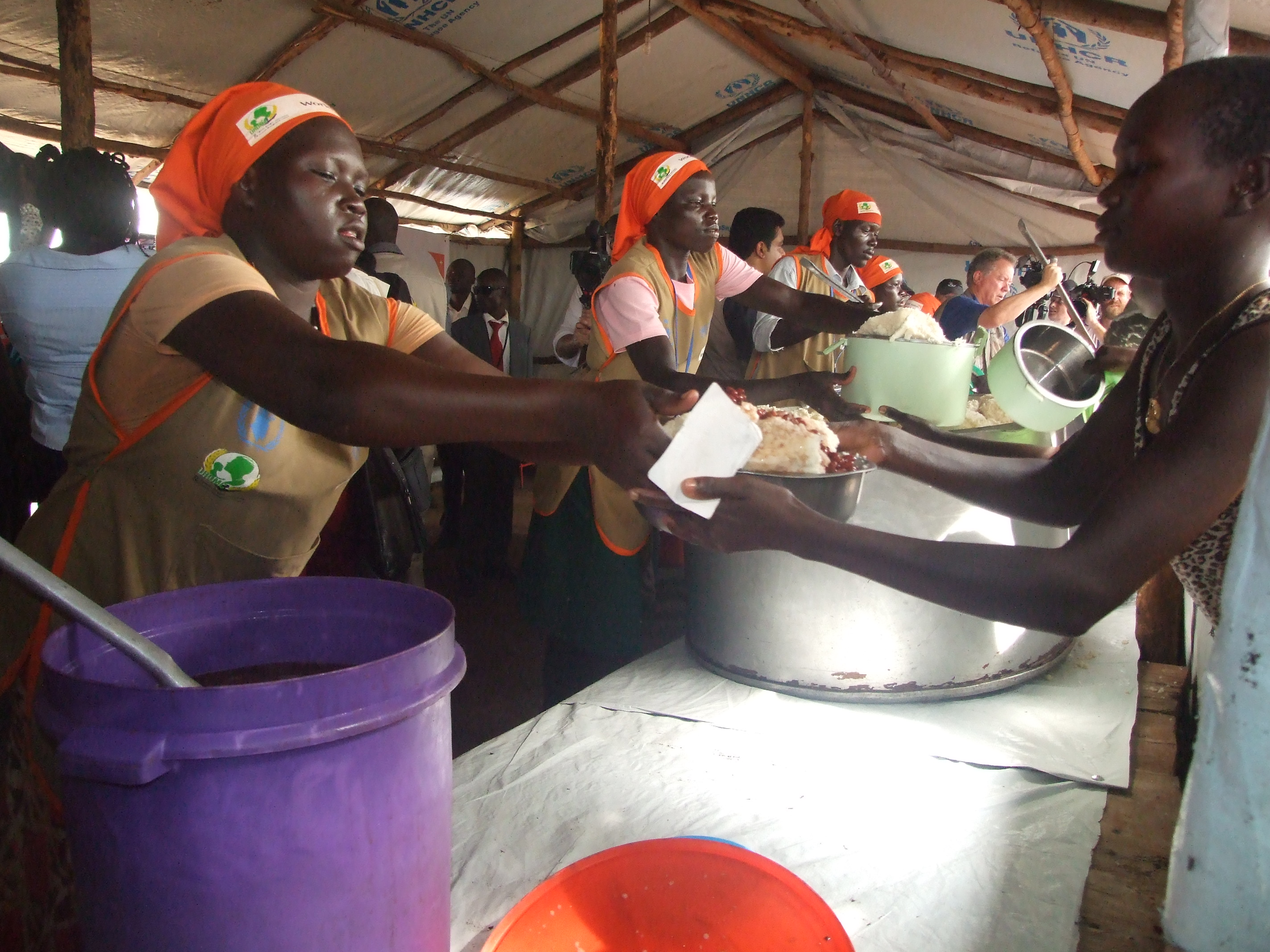
South Sudanese refugees being served food. Many complain of hunger due to the food rationing by the World Food Program.

=== Sexual exploitation of refugees ===
Reports and studies from 2002 onward have documented persistent sexual exploitation and abuse of refugees in Uganda, affecting mainly women and girls and, in some cases, boys. Abuse has been carried out by a range of actors, including aid workers, officials, community members, transport operators and other refugees. Investigations have also uncovered cases in which girls were drawn into prostitution through informal networks. Research consistently highlights that risks are present across multiple forms of assistance, particularly food and shelter distribution, and that weak reporting mechanisms, fear of retaliation and the normalization of violence often prevent survivors from coming forward. Women and girls in vulnerable situations, including unaccompanied adolescents, widows, single women and persons with specific needs, have been identified as especially at risk. Underlying factors contributing to violence included poverty, substance abuse and discriminatory gender norms that normalised violence, including the use of physical punishment as "discipline".

=== Health ===
Since 2022, a rising demand for humanitarian assistance and declining funding have placed the refugee system under severe pressure, with health services among the most affected.

In 2025, refugee settlements in Uganda recorded several disease outbreaks, while shortages of essential medicines and medical supplies affected as much as 30% of stock, reducing the capacity of health facilities to provide care. Across 12 of the country's 14 refugee-hosting locations, acute malnutrition increased from 5.4% to 7.8%, increasing risks to newborns, children, and mothers. Funding cuts also reduced disease surveillance and immunisation, raising the risk of vaccine-preventable outbreaks, including measles, while cholera and mpox responses continue.

==== COVID-19 and refugees ====
COVID-19 was declared a pandemic by the World Health Organization on 11 March 2020, after spreading to more than 114 countries and causing over 4,000 deaths. Refugees and displaced people were considered especially vulnerable because many lived in densely populated camps or settlements with limited access to basic services and reliable information, while also depending heavily on humanitarian organizations and government support. UNHCR warned that conditions in refugee settlements could facilitate transmission, because of limited access to water and reduced food rations. Ugandan authorities also found it difficult to ensure that refugees were complying with public-health guidelines to limit the spread of the coronavirus. Cross-border movement by refugees was also seen as a possible health-security risk.

In late March 2020, the Ugandan government suspended the admission of refugees and asylum seekers as the number of confirmed cases increased. COVID-19 vaccination rates among refugees were very low in late 2021, with less than 1% having received a first dose compared with 8% of Ugandan nationals, before social mobilisation and mass vaccination campaigns increased uptake in refugee settlements.

=== Corruption ===
Ugandan camp officials were accused of corruption after UN inspections revealed that refugee numbers had been vastly overstated, prompting donors to withhold funding until figures could be verified. In response, the government, with UN support, introduced biometric registration, suspended several officials, and launched investigations into alleged diversion of aid, bribery, and other abuses linked to refugee assistance. This has led to the investigation of some of these officials.
