= Lobule Refugee Settlement =

Refugee camp in Uganda

Lobule refugee settlement
- Refugee Settlement
- Location of Koboko District in West Nile, Northern Uganda

- Location in Uganda
- Coordinates: 3°30′05″N 30°58′31″E
- Country: Uganda
- Region: Northern Region

Population
  - Total: ~600 refugees

Lobule Refugee Settlement is a prominent refugee camp located in Koboko District, Northern Uganda.

== Background ==
Lobule Refugee Settlement is located in Koboko District, Northern Uganda. Established in September 2013 in Koboko District, it was created in response to the influx of refugees, primarily hosting over 4,600 refugees from the Democratic Republic of Congo (DRC) fleeing insurgency in their country. As of September 2022, Lobule hosted a significant refugee population, contributing to Uganda's broader refugee statistics. Lobule Refugee Settlement hosts over 4,600 refugees from the Democratic Republic of Congo (DRC) who fled the insurgency in their country. Refugees are settled in two zones (A and B), with each hosting four villages.

The provided information states that a Multi-Sector Needs Assessment conducted by UNHCR in August 2018 identified that Lobule Settlement has a total of 4,313 refugee household level surveys, with 124 households interviewed between 9 April and 14 July 2018. The assessment found that 100% of households reported being registered in the settlement, and 56% of households had at least one vulnerable member. The top three sectors with the most reported household needs were food, livelihoods, and non-food items.

== Demographics ==
Lobule Settlement has a female population of 296 and a male population of 278. The age distribution of the population is as follows: 860 individuals aged 0–4, 691 aged 5–11, 581 aged 12–17, 549 aged 18–59, 75 aged 60+, and 45 aged 65+.

== See also ==
List of Refugee settlements in Uganda
