= Ayilo 2 refugee settlement =

Ayilo 2 Refugee settlement
- Refugee camp
- Location within Uganda
- Coordinates: 3°15′32″N 31°57′11″E
- Country: Uganda
- Region: Northern Region
- District: Adjumani

Ayilo 2 refugee settlement is one of the refugee camps in Adjumani District in the Northern Region of Uganda.

== Background ==
Ayilo 2 refugee settlement is one of the camps in Adjumani District of Northern Region of Uganda that was established on 6 July 2014 to host the influx of South Sudanese refugees due to the South Sudan Civil War of 2013 and as well as those who fled the Country in the 1990s, who were not able to return home and chose to stay in Uganda.

== Geography ==
Ayilo 2 refugee settlement together with Ayilo 1 refugee camp have a combined surface area of 776 hectares and both camps have a combined population of 39,000 refugees of the South Sudanese origin.

== Food and nutrition ==
According to The Observer news findings and research, the refugees at Ayilo 2 refugee camp have resorted to selling their food ration distributed as a way to buy soap, salt and clothing for the children to use and make the family prepare the food they are given with minimal lack. This is because the distributed food does not come with those requirements that are intermediate and they end up doing the needful of selling food to get their needs.

== Healthcare ==
Ayilo 2 refugee settlement Map

According to the Arizona State University, the existing healthcare centre at Ayilo 2 refugee camp has a capacity to host the incoming number of patients that seek for the health care issues to be addressed. The centre has block structures that handles refugees as well as Nationals, the Host Communities for the provision of all its services. This has proved effective for the settlers as their health has been put to the consideration.

== Water and sanitation ==
Ayilo 2 Refugee Settlement Piped Water Supply System through the Ministry of Water and Environment of Uganda in Adjumani District is underway to provide water services to the refugees who are in dire need for these services as a way to promote the health and sanitation at the camp since the sanitation and water services were at a high risk of posing diseases and infections.

== See also ==
List of Refugee settlements in Uganda
