= Olua I Refugee settlement =

Coordinates: 3.30290°N 31.89562°E

Olua I Refugee settlement is a refugee camp in eastern Adjumani District in Northern Uganda. The Refugee settlement has its primary country as Uganda and other country South Sudan.

== Background ==
The settlement was originally closed in 2006 after many South Sudanese refugees returned home and was reopened in 2012 to host another influx of South Sudanese refugees fleeing inter-communal violence.

There are other refugees settlement residents in Adjumani district who live in close proximity to Ugandan nationals and share services and institutions with the host community. There is relatively peaceful coexistence between communities, however the refugees face challenging conditions and need more extensive assistance relating to livelihoods opportunities and education in particular.

== Water ==
Olua settlement does not have motorized boreholes and communities. Therefore, the community relies on hand pumps, which creates severe congestion.

== Health ==
The health centre is a long distance with broken bridge to Bira Health Center III in case Lewa Health Center does not have the services they need. This damages refugees and the nationals' ability to access health services.
