= Olua II Refugee settlement =

Refugee camp in Northern Region, Uganda

Uganda Olua II Refugee Settlement Map Adjumani as of 01 March 2018.

Olua II Refugee Settlement is a refugee camp located in the eastern part of Adjumani District in Northern Uganda. It was established in 1989, closed in 2006, and then re-opened in 2012. The camp is for South Sudanese refugees. According to the UNHCR, there were 18,154 refugees in the camp as of 2018.
