= Mungula II Refugee Settlement =

Mungula II Refugee Settlement is a refugee camp found in Adjumani District Itirikwa subcounty in Northern Uganda.

== Background ==
As of 31 August 2016, Mungula II refugee settlement had 787 refugees (mainly South Sudanese) but has the capacity to host between 7000-10,000 refugees. Between 2011 and 2012, there was repatriation of the then refugees when the peace agreement was signed in South Sudan but from 2013 to 2016, it had been re-established due to the South Sudan recent conflict of 2015 in South Sudan. Mungula II Refugee Settlement has consistently hosted South Sudanese refugees since it was first established in 1996. As a result, there are close linkages between settlement residents and the neighboring host community.

In Mungula II Refugee Settlement, the majority of new refugee arrivals are fleeing to Uganda from Juba, Central and Eastern Equatoria, citing a decreasing security situation and an increasing precarious food availability. Of the new arrivals in Adjumani and Yumbe Districts, majority have been of Ma`adi ethnicity, followed by Dinka, Nuer, Bari, Acholi, Lotuku, Kuku, Peri and others.

== Geography ==
Mungula II Refugee Settlement has a sitting surface Area of 105 hectares Current population with an average family plot size of 30m x 30m as of 1 March 2018.

== Socio-economic activities ==
In implementing the operational activities of the settlement, there was a need for a strategy for empowering local organizations and people around the camp to carry on activities in the medium and long-term. Development partners initially provided critical support during the South Sudanese refugee emergency. This enabled the refugees to engage in a number of socio-economic activities such as the following:.

=== Crop farming ===
Crops grown include maize, ground nuts, cowpeas, tomatoes, millet, cassava, simsim, beans, onions, sorghum and sweet potatoes.

=== Poultry keeping ===
Birds kept include hens, ducks, turkeys, geese, pigeons and guinea fowls.

=== Livestock keeping ===
Animals kept in the settlement include cattle, goats, pigs and sheep that are either kept on Free Range system or in specified kraals and other structures. The cattle kept is great source of beef and couple as the available source of labor in case farming is necessitated.

=== Local trading and businesses ===
Local trading activities include carpentry, brewing and selling local drinks, firewood selling, micro market vending and hunting.

The refugees in the settlement camp carry out other business activities such as charcoal burning, brick making, driving, black-smith, construction, iron smelting, rope making, knitting, bee keeping and hand craft.

== Education ==
Some of the refugees in the camp have enrolled in schools provided by the Ugandan government. There are four schools attended by refugees in this camp. About 1,970 refugees are attending school in or around the settlement, with gross enrolment rates. About 40% of the refugees enrolled are aged 3–5 while 60% of the learners are aged 14–17 years. There are two Pre-Primary Schools, two Primary Schools, 17 Secondary Schools, and 1 Adult Learning program (ALP).

== Social services ==
Refugees and the host community reported facing congestion at the water points where the communities often have to queue for over two hours. The refugees lack access to land for agricultural purposes which poses a big challenge to them in case of making necessary supplements to their monthly rations.

== Health care ==
The settlement shares Health Care facilities with nearby communities which poses a challenge of congestion and overcrowding when accessing such sites and has remained one of the biggest refugee crisis along with the increased trauma and psychological imperfections affecting the refugees due to their experiences of conflict.

There are two motorized boreholes and 18 hand pumps operational in the settlement and helps to pump just enough water for the daily activities of the refugees and improve the access to health and sanitary sector in the camp.

== See also ==
- Adjumani District
- Northern Region, Uganda
- Refugees of Uganda
