= Oliji refugee settlement =

Refugee camp in Uganda

Oliji refugee settlement is a refugee camp in Adjumani District of Uganda.

== Background ==
Oliji refugee settlement was established on 1 January 1991 to host mainly the South Sudanese refugee influx fleeing their country of origin since 2013 due to the South Sudan war.

== Social Services ==
South Sudanese grow rice in the Oliji refugee settlement with support from UNHCR and this project aims at enabling them to gain independence from the humanitarian Organizations as a support for the refugees as well as a source of employment and cash for the population.

== Education ==
The absence of scholarship opportunities particularly for post-primary students in Oliji refugee settlement has caused a high rate of dropouts as the children are faced with a lot of free time that needs to be used for the betterment of their lives. The high tuition fees have also affected the refugees in that they have not enough money to pay for their scholastics and often find it difficult to attend to educational services.
