= Boroli refugee settlement =

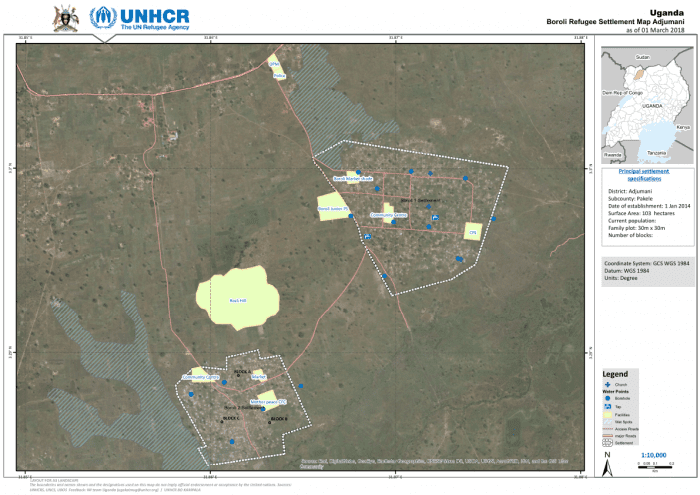
Boroli Refugee settlement map

Boroli refugee settlement is a refugee camp located in the Pakele Sub County of Adjumani District Northern Region, of Uganda.

== Background ==
Boroli refugee settlement was first opened on 1 January 2014 to host South Sudanese that fled insecurity in their country of origin due to the 2013 civil war. Boroli refugee settlement also hosts a minority of refugees from Ethiopian and Somalian countries.

== Education ==
At Boroli Primary School, the Lutheran World Federation - LWF has created and facilitated the running of the Child Rights Club of which young girls are given the privilege to express themselves through the leadership and space sharing for the youth.

== Social Services ==
Women that give birth to their newborn babies are given healthcare tool kits that help support them raise their babies with health facilities to take care of their admissions for giving birth, a services funded and supported by UNFPA in the nearby Biira Health centre.

Save The Children - STC has a Child Development Centre located in Boroli refugee settlement and aims at helping the young children cope with their infant development by providing them different learning kits that support them with the basic development stages.

VFH - Voice For Humanity, is a Non-Profit Organization that specializes in women's empowerment through skills training and microloans, with plans to implement women's health programs in the different camps of which Boroli refugee settlement is a direct beneficiary.

== Healthcare ==
There is a UNFPA - United Nations Population Fund provided and facilitated an ambulance that supports the refugees of the Boroli camp to be transferred in case of emergencies to the health facility of Biira Health Care for some immediate help and service. The Ambulance also gives support to the nearby camps bordering Boroli camp.

Teenage and young mothers are given proper health and fitness and advice on the matters related to their menstrual circles and personal hygiene and this has encouraged them to be aware and fight the claims that comes with the cultural biases due to the same. The health experts and the young women as well as the girls fight the myths regarding menstruation in the Boroli refugee settlement due to the facility put in place.
