= Maaji refugee settlements =

Refugee camps in Adjumani District, Uganda

Maaji
- Refugee camps
- Interactive map of Maaji
- Coordinates: 3.22°N 31.65°E
- Country: Uganda
- Region: Northern Region
- Sub-region: West Nile sub-region
- District: Adjumani
- Initially established: 1997
- Re-opened: 2015

Area
  - Total: 572 ha (1,410 acres)
- From UNHCR maps

Population (June 2018)
  - Total: 41,764
  - Density: 7,300/km^{2} (18,900/sq mi)
- (Only registered refugees counted)
- Time zone: UTC+03:00 (East Africa Time)

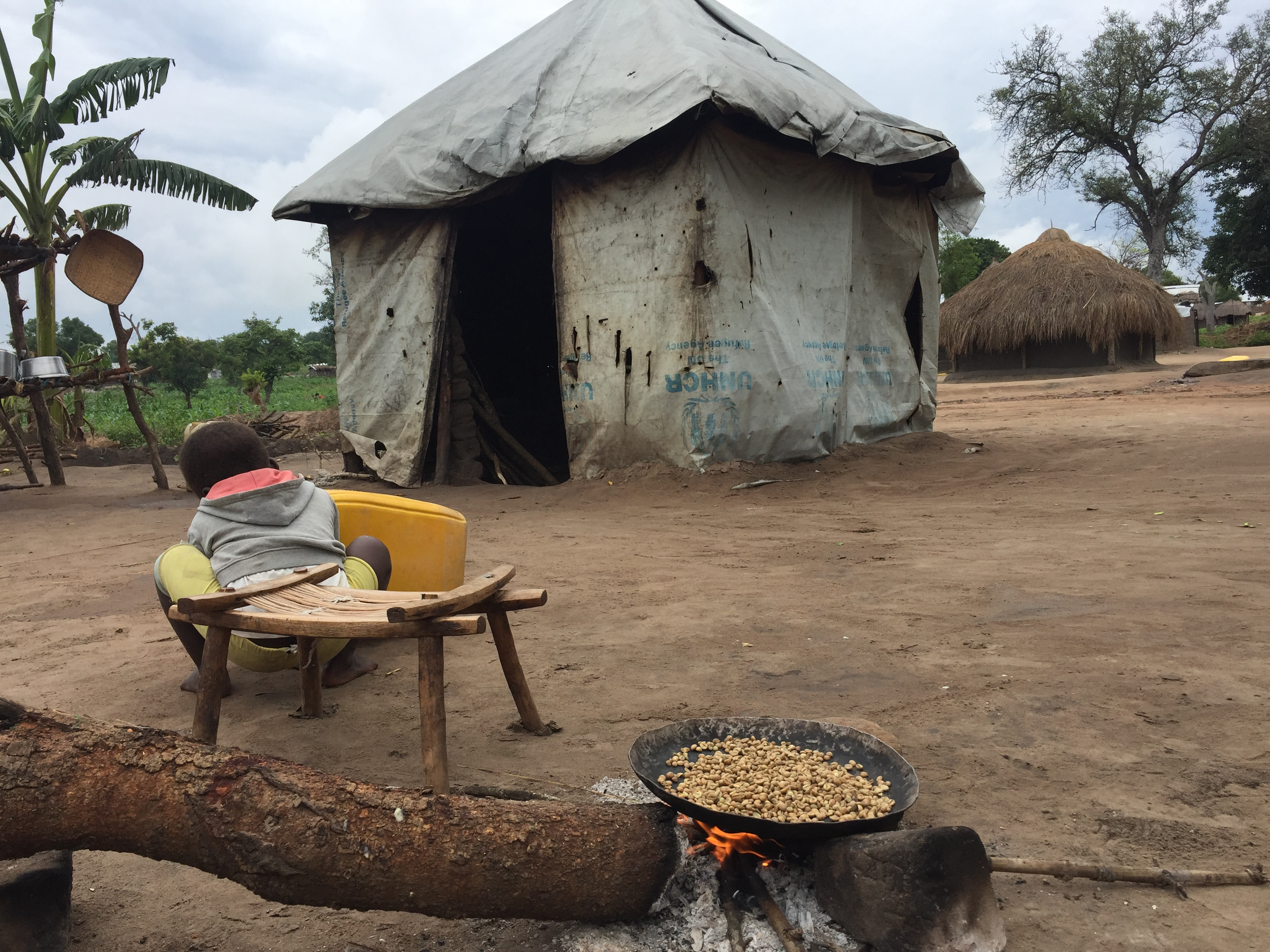
A house hold in a refugee camp in Uganda

The Maaji refugee settlements are three refugee camps located in Adjumani District in the Northern Region of Uganda, established in 1997. In June 2018, there were 41,764 registered refugees, accounting for 10% of the district's total population. It has primarily admitted refugees from the Second Sudanese Civil War and the ongoing South Sudanese Civil War. The settlements have been attacked several times by the Lord's Resistance Army, along with other camps in the region such as the Baratuku refugee settlement.

== Location and population ==
The refugee settlements are located in Adjumani District, within the West Nile sub-region of north-western Uganda, which borders South Sudan and the Democratic Republic of the Congo. They cover a total of 572 hectares (1,410 acres) of land. Maaji I has an area of 33 ha (82 acres) and is split into 2 blocks, Maaji II has an area of 278 ha (690 acres) in 6 blocks, and Maaji III covers 261 ha (640 acres) in 4 blocks.

In September 2017, there were a total of 34,657 registered refugees in the settlements: 671 in Maaji I, 17,364 in Maaji II, and 16,622 in Maaji III, all South Sudanese. The total population increased by 7,107 (20.5%) to 41,764 by June 2018.

== History ==
In 1997, the three Maaji refugee settlements (I, II, and III) were established to receive the influx of refugees due to the Second Sudanese Civil War.

In 2002 and 2003, the rebel group Lord's Resistance Army (LRA) conducted many attacks in north-western Uganda, which housed over 100,000 refugees at the time. In one case, on 8 July 2002, approximately 200 rebels from the LRA attacked the Maaji settlements. In two hours, they killed and abducted five refugees each. They also burned and looted 126 houses, as well as classrooms and a grinding mill. An entire site was reportedly destroyed, its health centre having been robbed of drugs and equipment. The day later, hundreds of refugees attempted to walk the 45 kilometres (28 mi) to the town of Adjumani. The Maaji camps had approximately 11,000 residents in 2002.

Maaji II and III were later reopened in 2015 to accommodate new arrivals from the South Sudanese Civil War. The camp was reportedly no longer receiving new arrivals by September 2017, though efforts are still being made to improve the well-being of residents.

== Social services ==
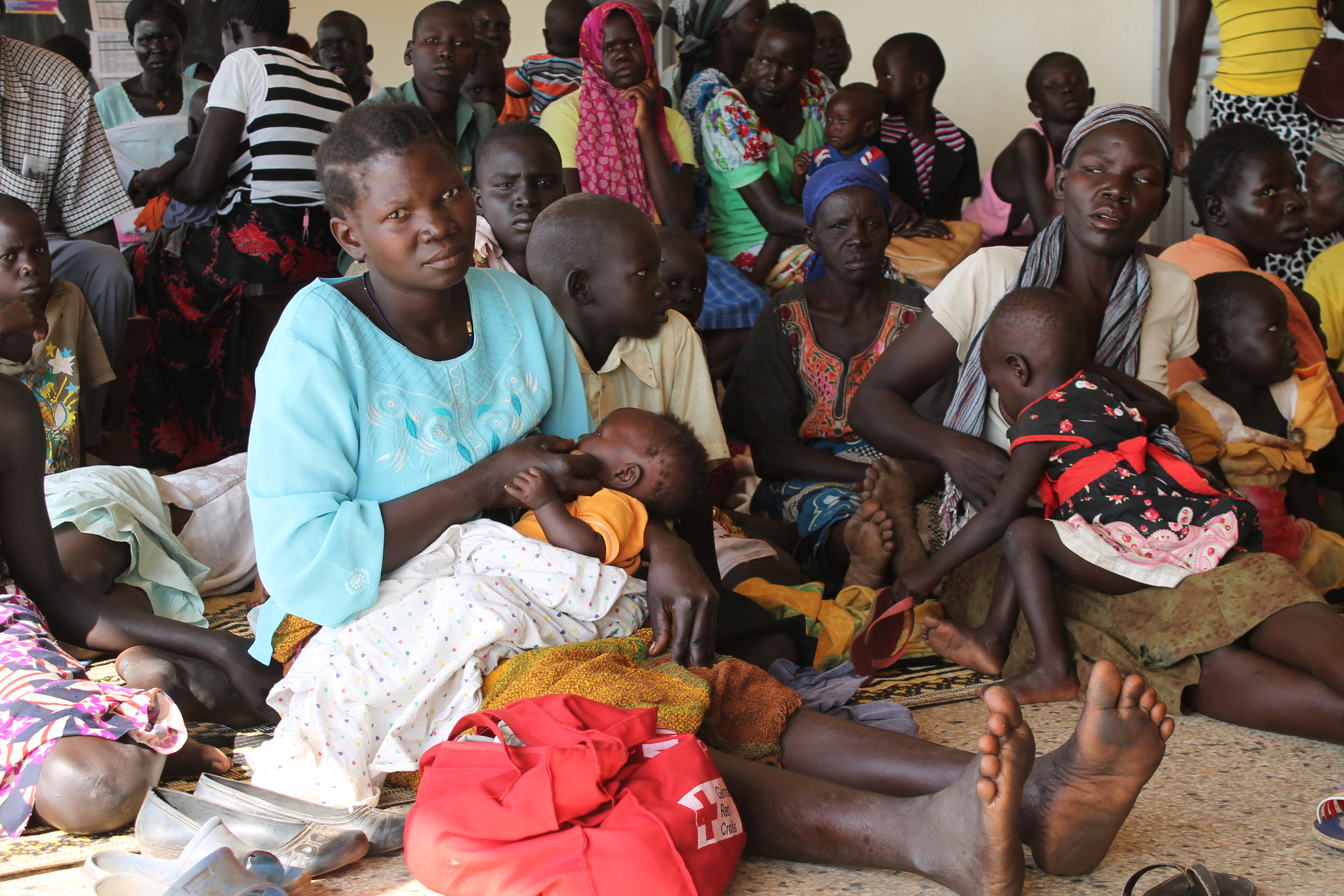
Refugees waiting at a health center in the settlement

In 2019, a project by World Vision International (WVI), in collaboration with the United Nation Development Programme, was started in Maaji II. The project aimed to promote coexistence between tribes within the settlement by providing road construction jobs (in a "cash for work" program) to selected vulnerable families. According to WVI, 130 people from the settlement and host community benefitted, although many people not part of the project still hold grudges. Another project in Maaji II, by the Women's International Peace Centre supported by the UNHCR and local governments, attempted to address conflicts primarily between the Nuer and Dinka. This project aimed to settle the causes of conflict and held mediation sessions with leaders as well as children. The district later reported improved relations between the communities within the settlement.

== Facilities ==
According to a 2018 UNHCR report, the quality of education has been affected by the scarcity of educational facilities and teachers in the area. There are no pre-primary schools within the settlement, while tuition fees for secondary schools are unfeasible for parents.

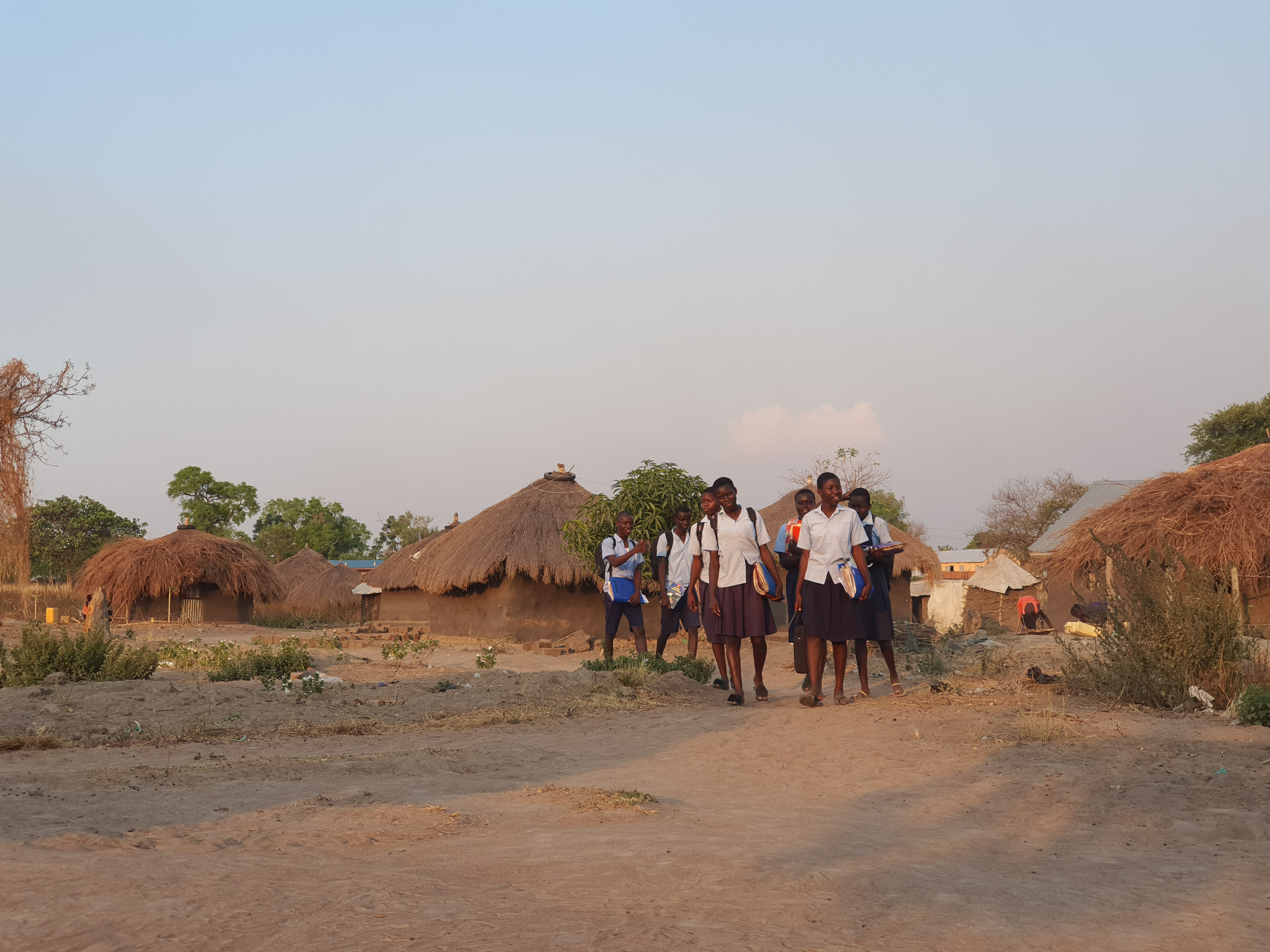
Refugee children coming from school in Uganda

The report also stated that health services available at the camp are significantly affected. The lack of health facilities, resources, and workers causes congestion and long waiting hours at the health center.

The report stated that the Maaji refugees were faced with some challenges which include; lack of employment and limited access to building materials, preventing the renovation and rehabilitation of their shelters

== Climatic change ==
Many Organizations and different partners ensure that almost every part of refugee camp is planted with trees that Will protect the settlement from heavy rainfall and wind
