= Mirieyi refugee settlement =

Mirieyi refugee settlement is a refugee camp in Ofua Sub County in the Adjumani District of Uganda.

== Background ==
The settlement was established on 1 January 1994 to host South Sudanese refugees influx from their country of origin prior to the peace agreement in 2011 as well as those from the South Sudanese Civil War of 2013 with the neighbouring Sudan.

== Geography ==
Mirieyi refugee settlement has a total surface area of 44 hectares enough to host 5000 South Sudanese refugees who fled their country prior to their peace process signing.

== Social Services ==
1 classroom block was constructed in Mirieyi Primary School including 8 classrooms renovated as well as a Water harvesting system in Mirieyi refugee settlement that hosts about 778 children by the help and support of UNICEF.
