= Mungula refugee settlement =

Ugandan refugee settlement

Mungula refugee settlement is located in Adjumani district in northern Uganda on the border with South Sudan.

== Background ==
MUGULA 1 was first established in 1996 as a safe haven for South Sudanese fleeing war in their country, most of whom were women and children. The refugee influx worsened due to prolonged years of war in Sudan for independence of the African south from the predominantly Arab north. Civil conflict between the Dinka and the Nuer resulting from disagreements between President Salva Kiir and his deputy Dr. Riek Macha also contributed to the refugee problem. Insecurity pushed most of the south Sudanese to neighboring countries that were relatively safe.

== Social amenities ==
MUGULA 1 is home to Mugula Health Centre IV, and clean running water. Education facilities includes Aliwara primary school, Mugula primary school and Mungula secondary school. All these serve both the refugees in the settlement and the host community.

== Challenges ==
Residents of the settlement decry the general health facilities malaise; the long distances to health facilities is worsened by the exorbitant private health clinic fares coupled with poor referral procedures as a result of shortage of ambulances to help in case of emergencies, in addition to lack of sufficient number of health workers.

The residents also complain of poor quality education accessed due to a shortage of learning materials, teachers, congestion and language barrier. High tuition fees also hinder many from accessing the required education.

Limited access to building materials forces many to live in poor shelter, some complain of leaking roofs. Food insecurity is also an issue due to the high cost of renting land for agricultural purposes from the host community.

Congestion at water access points and poor latrine coverage are also big challenges.

== Positive results ==
There is peace and harmony between the host communities and the residents of the settlement, thus programmes targeting refugees also help and support the host community.

There are strong leadership structures at the settlement (refugee welfare committees) such as child protection committee, water source committee and gender taskforce to handle problems that may arise.

In 2018, there was a farming trial in the camp for almost 5000 refugees to produce their own food.
