= Alere 2 Refugee settlement =

Refugee camp in Uganda

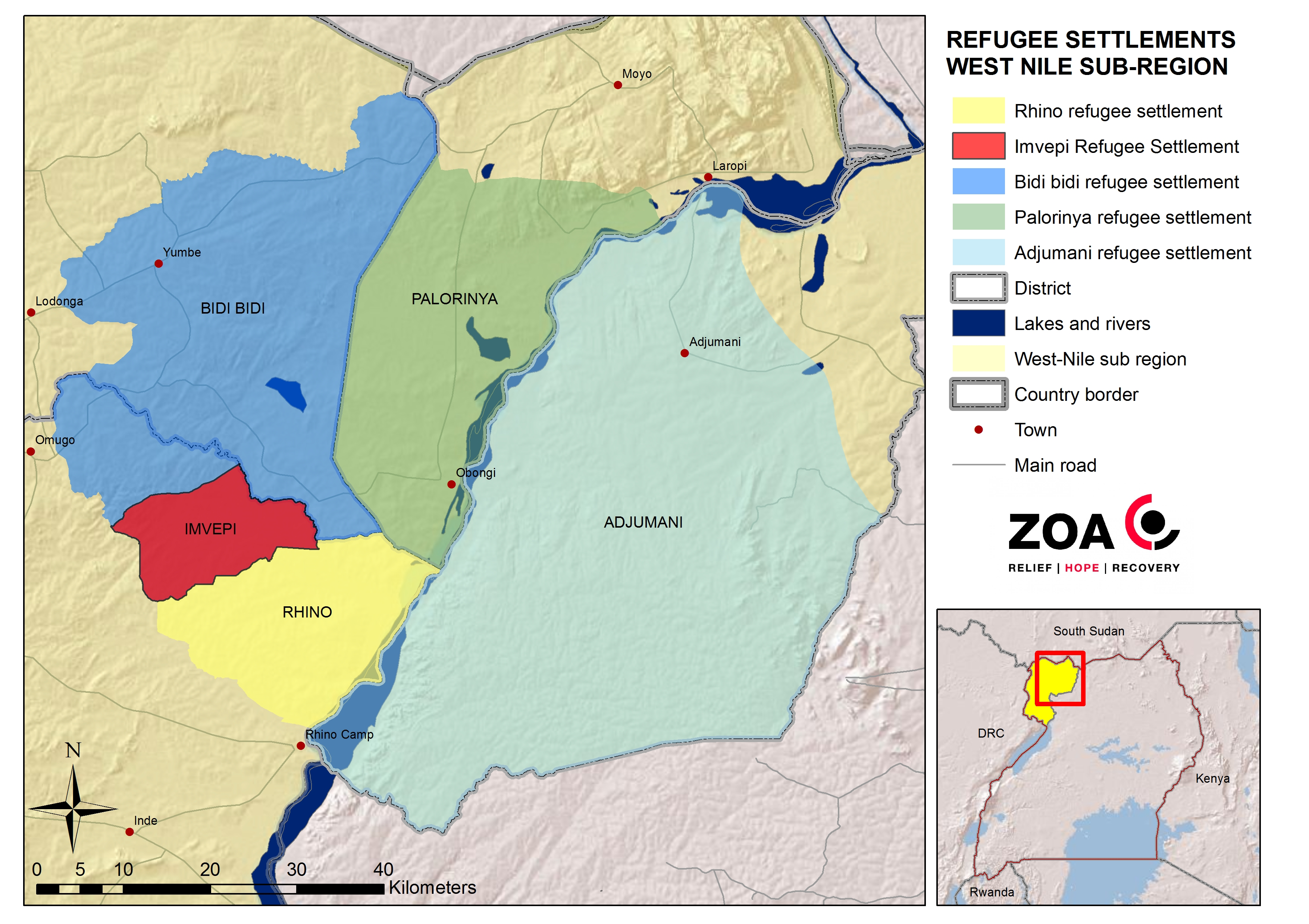
Basemap refugee settlements in Westnile

Alere 2 Refugee Settlement is located in Adjumani District in the Northern Region of Uganda.

== Background ==
On June 12, 1990, Alere 2 was created. Since then, over 6,000 people live in the settlement including Second Sudanese Civil War refugees.

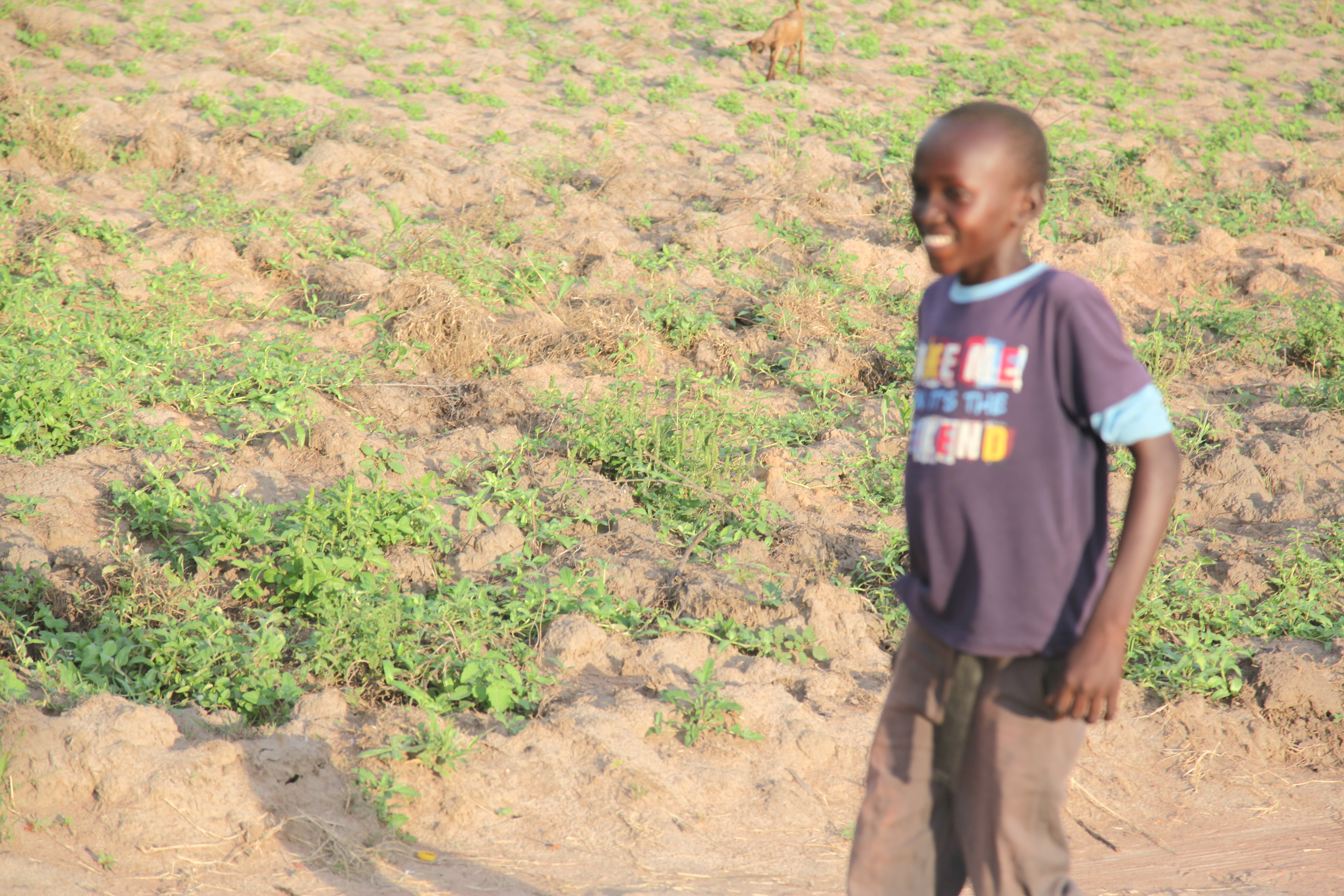
A boy moving in the refugee camp in Uganda

== Social services ==
A project to build a sanitation system for Alere was started in 2019.

== Health and sanitation ==
32.6 percent of Alere refugees have access to latrines.
