= Oruchinga Refugee Settlement =

- Location within Uganda
- Coordinates: 0.9273°S 30.7521°E
- Country: Uganda
- District: Isingiro
- Established: 1959 (transit centre); gazetted 1961

Area
  - Total: 8 km^{2} (3.1 sq mi)

Population (July 2021)
  - Total: 8,261
  - Density: 1,000/km^{2} (2,700/sq mi)
- Time zone: UTC+3 (EAT)

Oruchinga Refugee Settlement is a refugee camp in Isingiro District in Southern Uganda.

== History ==
Oruchinga opened in 1959 as a transit centre for refugees from Rwanda and was officially recognised in 1961 through Uganda Gazette General Notice No. 1433. In 2016, Uganda’s Office of the Prime Minister, with partners, supported high-resolution mapping of the settlement to strengthen land-use planning and risk-informed development.

== Population ==
The Oruchinga refugee settlement is presently hosting more than 6,800 refugees from Burundi, DRC (Democratic Republic of Congo) and Rwanda.

According to the current statistics the settlement is not receiving new refugees, apart from family reunification, referrals, and protection cases.

A July 2021 settlement profile produced from OPM/UNHCR registration statistics reported a total population of 8,261 and 1,898 households, with 8,259 refugees and 2 asylum-seekers. The same profile listed country-of-origin totals as Democratic Republic of the Congo (4,440), Rwanda (1,981), Burundi (1,809) and South Sudan (31).

== Location and administration ==
The settlement covers about 8 km2 in Isingiro District and sits near the Uganda–Tanzania border. The settlement was described in 2016 as comprising at least 15 villages spread across the settlement area.

Refugee management in Uganda is led by the Office of the Prime Minister, which receives, documents and settles refugees and coordinates stakeholders involved in the refugee response.

A 2019 UNHCR factsheet described the settlement as hosting refugees from Burundi, the Democratic Republic of the Congo and Rwanda, and reported limited new arrivals aside from family reunification, referrals and protection cases.

== Economic activities ==
According to the UNDP in 2018, a number of refugees in Oruchinga Refugee Settlement were engaged in greenhouse farming.

The Oruchinga refugee settlement hosts a number of education facilities such as Kayenje Primary School and Kajaho Primary School.

== Social Services ==
A 2016 assessment reported good accessibility to primary and secondary schools and described healthcare accessibility as fair, based on spatial analysis and mapping of services and infrastructure. The Office of the Prime Minister reported solar systems installed in schools across several south western settlements, including Oruchinga, as part of wider energy access support in refugee-hosting areas.

== Livelihoods ==
An OPM-supported assessment reported agriculture as the dominant land use in Oruchinga, with refugee households allocated land for crop production. It listed major crops as maize, beans, bananas and sorghum.

UNDP reported greenhouse farming initiatives in the settlement as part of efforts to improve production and income for participating refugees.

== Environment and climate ==
A 2016 assessment for Oruchinga reported an average annual temperature of 15.6 °C and average annual precipitation of about 1,106 mm, citing long-term climate data for the area. The same assessment identified soil erosion risks and reported that sand mining and erosion were affecting land availability and land quality in parts of the settlement.

== See also ==
- Refugees in Uganda
- Isingiro District
- Nyumanzi Refugee Settlement

Population snapshots (selected sources)
Date/Source	Total population	Notes
January 2016 (OPM/UNDP mapping assessment)	6,289	“People of concern”
July 2021 (OPM/UNHCR settlement profile)	8,261	Registration statistics
