= Palorinya Refugee Settlement =

- Location within Uganda
- Coordinates: 3.4774°N 31.6121°E

Area
  - Total: 37.58 km^{2} (14.51 sq mi)

Population (June 2023)
  - Total: 124,632
  - Density: 3,316/km^{2} (8,590/sq mi)

The Palorinya Refugee Settlement is a refugee camp in the Moyo District of the Northern Region of Uganda. The majority of the population fled the civil crisis in South Sudan in 2016.

== Background ==
The Palorinya Refugee Settlement was established in December 2016 to host refugees from South Sudan. It was opened to reduce overcrowding at the Bidibidi Refugee Settlement. By the end of 2016, 25,212 South Sudanese refugees were received at Palorinya. As of May 2018, there were approximately 166,000 people from South Sudan living in the settlement. In June 2023, the population was 124,632 according to the United Nations High Commissioner for Refugees (UNHCR).

== Geography ==
The settlement has a total surface area of 37.58 square kilometres (14.51 square miles) and is closed to new arrivals.

== Environment ==
Residents in Palorinya are growing trees in a response to climate change.

Palorinya is adjacent to the Era Central Forest Reserve and, beyond that, the Otze Forest Sanctuary. These protected areas are biodiverse and the last refuge for many local plants and animals. Since 2018, the nonprofit Wild Forests and Fauna, in partnership with Moyo District Forestry Services, has implemented environmental initiatives across the settlement.

The refugees in Palorinya face a challenge of properly disposing of trash, especially plastic, with negative impacts on the environment and agriculture.

== Education ==
Refugees in Bidibidi, Palorinya, and surrounding host communities are receiving training in vocational skills implemented by the UNHCR. Education in Palorinya is provided for both refugee and host communities by some of the organisations.

== Water ==
Supplying water in Palorinya is a challenge being tackled by some organisations.
