= Baratuku refugee settlement =

Refugee settlement in Uganda

- Location within Uganda
- Coordinates: 3.13°N 31.77°E
- Country: Uganda
- District: Adjumani
- Established: 1991

Baratuku refugee settlement is a refugee settlement in the Adjumani district in Uganda.

== Background ==
Baratuku, established in 1991, hosted successive waves of South Sudanese refugees from the Second Sudanese War onward. By 2018, the settlement’s population consisted of refugees who had arrived in the 1990s and were unable to return home, as well as more recent arrivals who had fled South Sudan since 2013. During this period, humanitarian organisations began shifting from emergency response to stabilisation, and as some emergency focused partners scaled down or ended operations, concerns emerged about the need to fill gaps in assistance to ensure adequate support for refugees.

== Demographics ==
In 2018, Baratuku hosted 9,621 registered refugees. Adjumani District had a total population of 170,029 nationals and 236,034 refugees, with refugees in Baratuku accounting for about 2% of the district population. Among children and older people, the numbers of females and males were broadly similar, while among those aged 18 to 59 there were roughly twice as many women as men.

== Food and nutrition ==
In 2018, food distributions were insufficient and frequently delayed, which forced refugees to seek casual labour in host communities in order to earn small incomes to purchase additional food. Households were often not able to grow sufficient food to supplement their small food rations because their allocated plots were not large enough to cultivate. This was compounded by limited access to capital for starting small scale businesses and other income generating activities, making it difficult for households to secure sustainable incomes to meet basic needs. Refugees also reported borrowing food from households with smaller family sizes.

== Education ==
In 2018, there was a severe shortage of schools, classrooms, teachers, and learning materials, which undermined refugees’ access to quality education and a supportive learning environment. Educational opportunities were further limited because primary schooling only extended to P5 and no secondary schools were available, while the absence of school feeding programmes, highlighted by both refugees and host community members, contributed to high levels of absenteeism.

The sole secondary school that serves school-age youth in Baratuku refugee settlement is located far away from the settlement, making it difficult for students to get there. Even for refugee families that live near the school, many have limited livelihoods opportunities and cannot afford tuition and related school costs which poses a great challenge to the young uneducated generation. At the Global Refugee Forum, Education Cannot Wait (ECW), commits to investing in multi-year programmes for refugees and host-community children. This initiative seeks to meet the refugees' dire need for educational resources and scholarships. It also gives the refugees and Host communities at the Baratuku refugee settlement a chance to enjoy an inclusive education for vulnerable children and adolescents.

== Healthcare ==
In 2015, services to do with health care and sanitation were found to be inadequate for the settlement population. There was only one health center for refugees in Baratuku camp which also served large populations of Ugandan nationals and other refugees from the Elema Refugee Settlement and made service delivery slow and insufficient for refugees. This had a greater impact on the young and elderly since they are prone to infections and disease outbreaks.

In 2018, access to health care was difficult due to long distances to health centres, together with limited ambulance services, and weak referral mechanisms. As a result, some women gave birth at home or while travelling to health facilities. Health centres were also inadequately equipped and experienced frequent medicine shortages, which required refugees and host community members to purchase drugs from private clinics that many could not afford.

== Water, sanitation and hygiene ==
In 2018, refugees reported that only a small number of boreholes were accessible to the refugee community, and that not all of them were functional. This created significant gaps in access to water for both refugees and host community members. Both groups reported that drinking water supply was irregular, with interruptions lasting several days, and the quality of the available water was poor.

== See also ==
- List of Refugee settlements in Uganda
