= Madi-Okollo =

District in the West Nile region of Uganda

- District
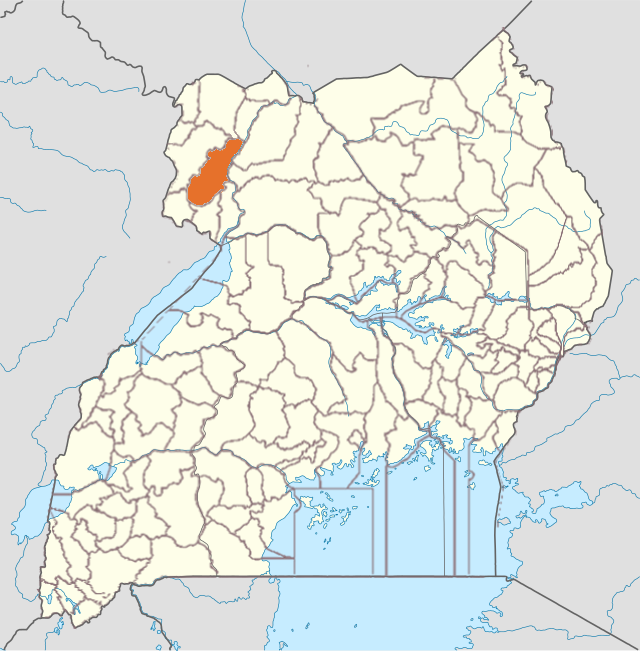
- Map of Madi-Okollo
- Interactive map of Madi-Okollo
- Coordinates: 2°52′50.74″N 31°12′59.75″E
- Country: Uganda
- Region: Northern
- Sub-region: West Nile

Area
  - Total: 2,048 km^{2} (791 sq mi)

Population (2024 Census)
  - Total: 178,051
  - Density: 86.94/km^{2} (225.2/sq mi)
- Time zone: UTC+3:00 (EAT)

Madi Okollo is a district in the West Nile region of Uganda. It is located in the northern part of Uganda originally under Arua District comprising Rigbo, Ogoko Ewang Inde town council, Rhino Camp Town council (all in lower madi) and Okollo, Uleppi, Offaka, Anyiribu, Okollo sub-counties and Okollo Town council.

== Administrative structure ==
Madi Okollo district is made up of eight sub-counties forming the Upper and lower Madi constituencies. The district officially started its operations on 1st July, 2019 after being curved out from Arua District with an initial budget allocation of 16 billion Uganda Shillings.

== Population ==
As of 2020, the district had an estimated population of 164,200 people. The population is largely rural, with livelihoods mainly surviving on agriculture, trade, and small-scale economic activities.

== Geographical location and boundaries ==
Madi Okollo District lies at the center of the West Nile sub-region. It is bordered to the east by the River Nile, as well as Amuru and Adjumani Districts. Obongi and Yumbe Districts form its northern boundary, while Arua and Terego Districts lie to the west. To the south, the district shares borders with Zombo, Nebbi, and Pakwach Districts.

== Accessibility and transport links ==
Madi Okollo district is accessible via the Arua to Pakwach Road. The district is located approximately 58 kilometres South East of Arua City, the main commercial and urban center in the West Nile region. The Madi Okollo district headquarters are about 616 kilometres from Kampala, Uganda’s capital city, when travelling through Pakwach and Karuma. This positioning places Madi Okollo along an important transport corridor that links the West Nile region to the rest of the country.

== Leadership ==
- Hon Joanne Aniku Okia (District Woman Member of Parliament)
- Swaib Toko (Resident District Commissioner (RDC))
- Ismail Drabe District Chairperson (LCV)

== See also ==
- Kampala district
- Mubende District
- Districts of Uganda
