= Pagirinya Refugee Settlement =

Palorinya Refugee Settlement
- Location within Uganda
- Coordinates: 3.353°N 31.992°E
- Country: Uganda
- District: Adjumani

Pagirinya Refugee Settlement is a refugee camp in Eastern Adjumani District in Northern Uganda.

== Background ==
Pagirinya refugee settlement, as of October 2016 was one of the newest of Uganda's refugee settlements, launched in June 2016 after the Maaji Refugee Settlements reached its full capacity and could not accommodate the great number of the refugees.

== Population ==
Pagirinya refugee settlement hosts more than 32,000 refugees displaced from South Sudan.

== Health and sanitation ==
A cholera outbreak hit Pagirinya refugee settlement soon after it opened which was due to the increased exposure to dirty water and unattended to water crisis at the settlement and is still a big problem to be taken care of by the Government of Uganda.

Refugees reported poor latrine coverage throughout Pagirinya refugee settlement and the locals have resorted to open defecation as a final aid to the problem facing them at the camp due to the low coverage of latrines.

== Water supply ==
Most of the refugees within Pagirinya use poor practices for handling their water sources and have a higher risk of contracting of waterborne diseases and infections as the low level of supply of water still remains a big challenge.

== Education ==
Pagirinya refugee settlement has different schools to support education for the young children, according to UNICEF Gulu Zonal Office reports. In 2016, 13 replenishment kits were distributed to Maaji Primary School which has over 3,500 pupils to support the education of the pupils.

Reports also indicate that 4,721 refugees are registered in Pagirinya Settlement in three primary schools; Pagirinya government primary school, Pariginya 1&2 feeder primary schools.

The settlement’s organized, physical design facilitates access to important facilities, including health centres and schools.

== Housing and property ==
According to REACH reports, 77% of shelter tenure is owned by the head of the household, 12% owned by the spouse and 11% owned jointly between household member. The household access to land where shelter is 99%, Accessing land in a separate plot is 3% and 1 % have no access to any land.
