= Rhino Camp Refugee Settlement =

Refugee camp in Uganda

- Location within Uganda
- Coordinates: 2.966°N 31.395°E
- Country: Uganda
- District: Madi-Okollo, Terego

Population (January 2018)
  - Total: ~123,243
- Time zone: UTC+3 (EAT)

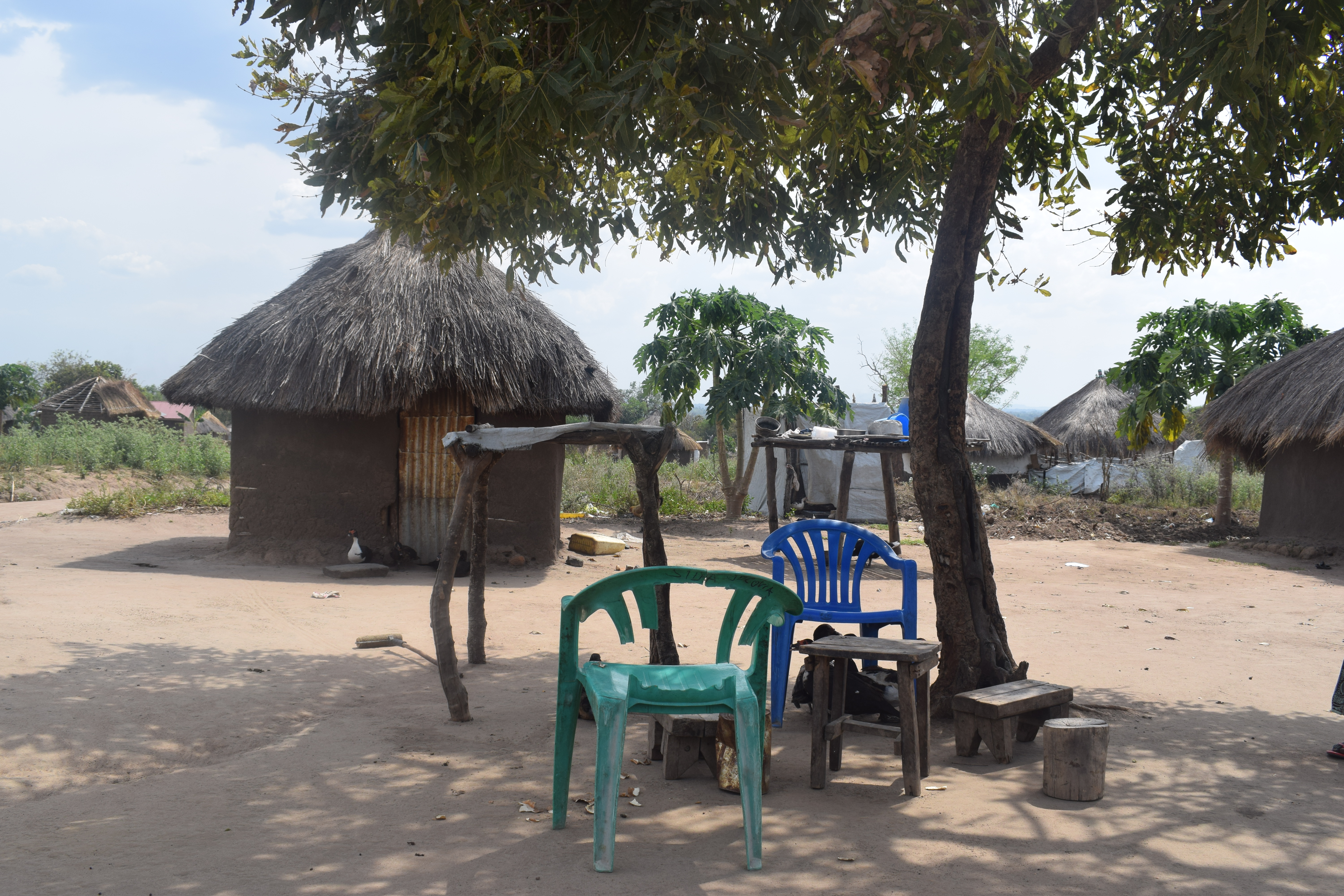
Homestead in Rhino Camp Refugee Settlement

Rhino Camp Refugee Settlement is a refugee camp located in the districts of Madi-Okollo and Terego District (which were formerly part of Arua District) in North Western Uganda.

== Location and geography ==
Rhino settlement covers an approximated area of 225 km^{2}. It extends in Odupi, Omugo and Uriama sub-counties in Terego District.

== Background ==
It was opened in 1980 and expanded in the wake of the South Sudanese civil war to host the sudden influx of refugees into Northern Uganda.

As of January 2018, the settlement had 123,243 registered refugees, mostly South Sudanese, and continues to receive new arrivals.

As of 2021, Rhino camp hand the following number of refugees from different countries.

Residents of Rhino Refugee settlement
Country of origin	Number of refugees
South Sudan	121,440
Democratic Republic of the Congo	3,275
Sudan	836
Rwanda	49
Burundi	26
Central African Republic	12
Kenya	10
Total	125,648

== Education ==
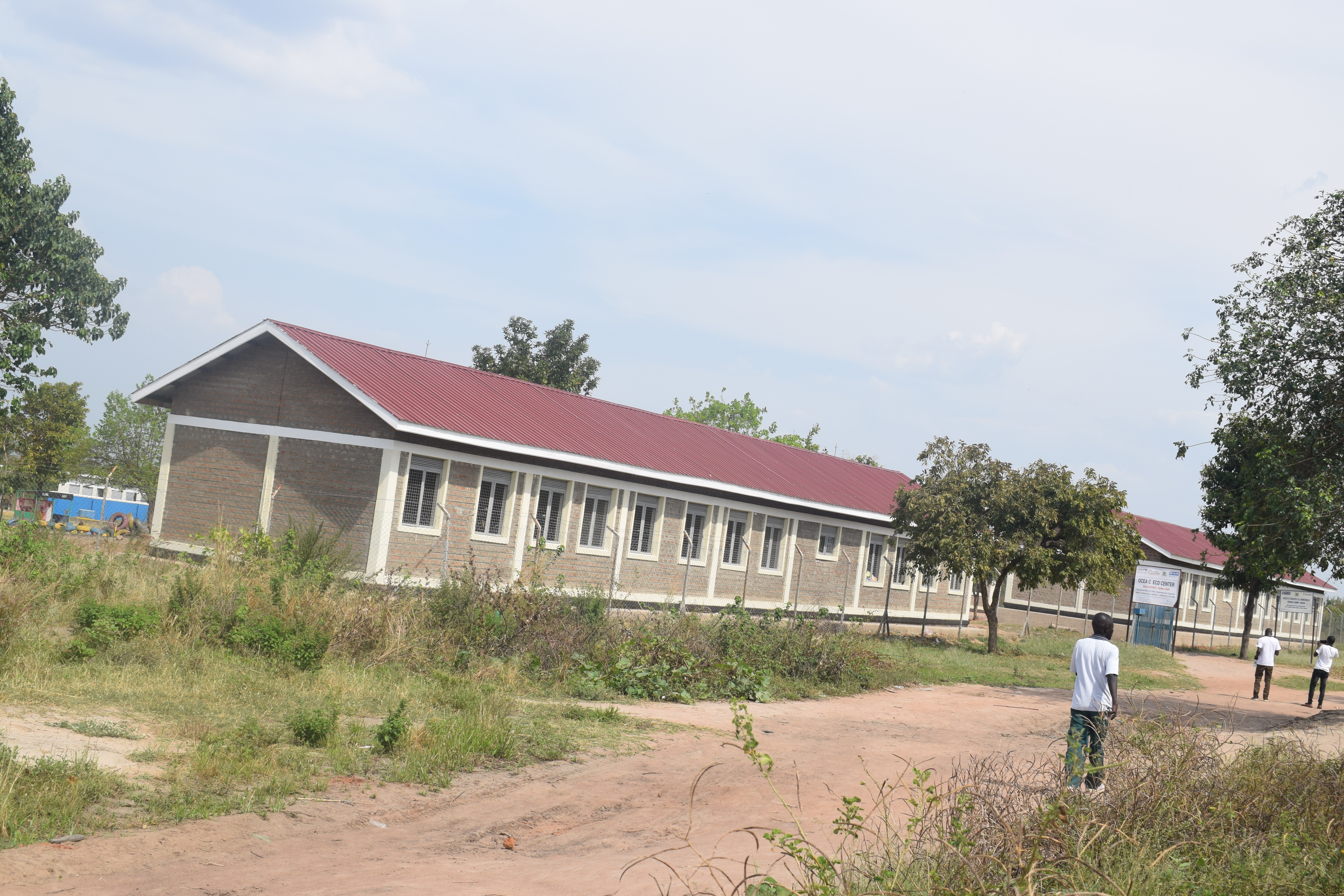
Ocea C Early Childhood Development Centre in Rhino Camp Refugee Settlement

Rhino camp Refugee settlement has seven zones which includes, Ofua Zone, Omugo Zone, Ocea Zone, Odobu Zone, Siripi Zone, Tika Zone and Eden Zone.

As of 2020 Rhino camp Refugee settlement has a few of the following schools which have been established in the various zones as follows:

Ofua Zone

- Amuru Primary School
- Royal Nursery and Primary School
- Cinya Primary School
- Ofua Secondary school
- Bright Star Primary School
- Alengo ECD
- Ofua 3 Primary School Project 25.

Omugo Zone

- Komoyo Primary school
- St Mary's Ociea Primary school
- St Luke Ayitu Primary School
- St Kizito Odra primary school
- St Luke widi secondary school
- Tinate ECD centre
- St Mary's ECD centre
- Loketa ECD centre
- St Mary's Ocia ECD centre
- St James ECD centre

Ocea Zone

- Yoro Primary School
- Hope Primary School
- Harmony CED
- Ocea Primary School
- Katiku Primary School

Siripi Zone

- Siripi Primary school
- Wanguru Primary School
- Ariwa Primary School
- Yelulu Primary School
- Ariaze Primary School

Tika Zone

- Tika Primary School
- Olujobo Primary School

Odobu Zone

- Odobu Primary School
- Wanyange Primary School
- Rhino Camp High Secondary School

Eden Zone

- Eden Primary School

== Health ==
Health concern is a growing demand as health conditions become more reported in the camp. With the large influx and continuous arrival of refugees, health centers have been crowded with the demanding numbers, hence causing delays in service providing and referrals.

The refugee health report ascertains that the number of deaths per 1,000 population across Palabek, Imvepi, Rwamwanja and Rhino Camp had the highest incidences of reports still suggests that the health conditions in Rhino camp is demanding.

In response, UNHCR supported 95 health facilities across 12 refugee hosting districts by 2017 that provided a total of 2,129,027 medical consultations in 2017 out of which 22% were to host population. ... There were 19 maternal death across all refugee settlements which were all investigated.

Local reports from the RWC (Refugee welfare council) request a better professionalized treatment, including more local language speaking volunteers to be added to the hospital to increase communication efficiency between the patients (Refugees) and the medical officers. Susan Grace Duku who was a South Sudanese refugee in the camp documented the issues in the camp during the COVID-19 pandemic.

Rhino camp refugee has a number of mini health facilities:

1. Ocea Zone, Ocea Health Center 2

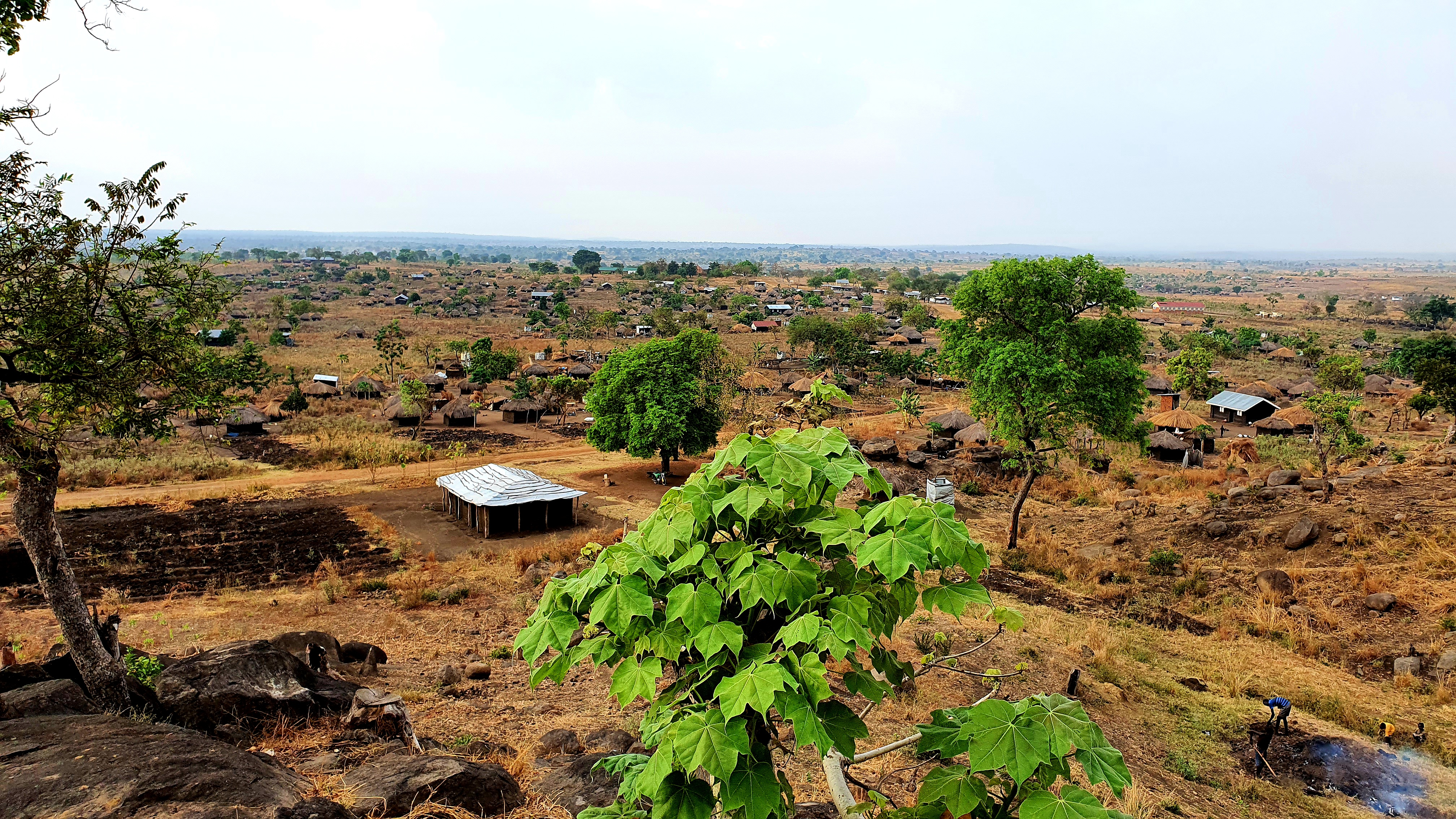
An aerial view of a cluster in Rhino camp refugee settlement

2. Siripi Zone, Siripi Health Center 3

3. Odobu Zone, Odobu Health Center 2

4. Tika Zone, Olujobu Health Center 3

5.Ofua Zone, Ofua Health Center 3

6. Omugo Zone, Omugo Health Center 3

7. Omugo Health Center IV

8. Ocia Health Center 3

== Agriculture ==
Some of the refugees grow cash crop such as Tobacco while others grow food crops. And also some rear animals such as goats

== Water ==
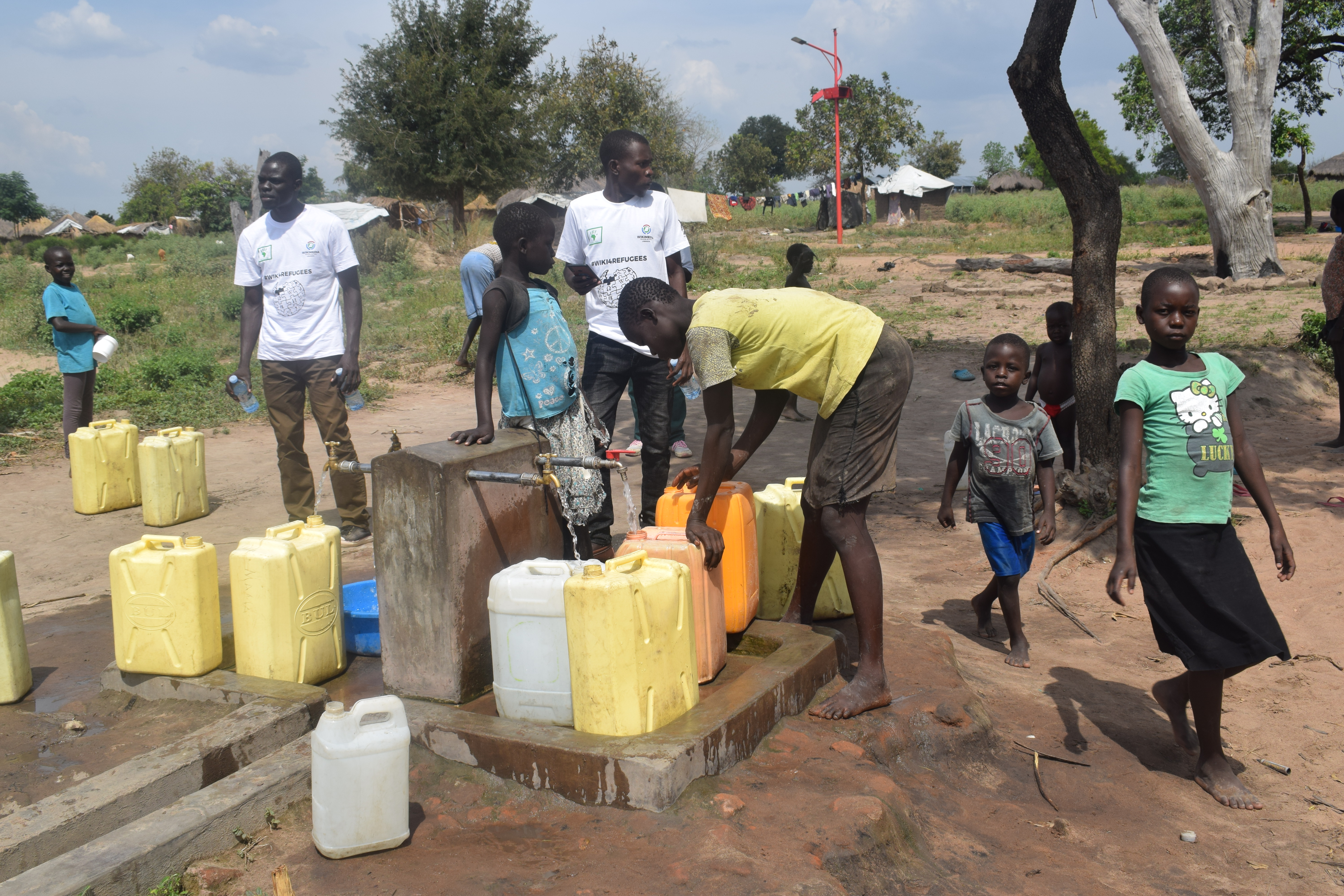
Borehole in Ocea C Village, Rhino Camp Refugee Settlement

According to the Uganda Refugee Response Monitoring Settlement Fact Sheet: Rhino Camp (January 2018), there are few water sources and difficult-to-pump boreholes contribute to long wait times for refugees to access water. Poor-quality ground water means expensive piped water networks have to be constructed; with the settlement dependent on water provisioning through trucking as construction is ongoing. Additionally, the quality of water from the tanks is poor, with reports of occasional contamination.

The other water sources in Rhino Camp refugee Settlement Arua District include:

- Boreholes in all the seven Zones of Rhino Camp Refugee Settlement
- Motorized Solar Power Borehole
- Water solar pump system which pumps water and produces 200,000-300,000 litres of water per day helping to raise the amount of water each refugee household gets from the initial average of 5-7 litres per day to 18 litres per person per day.
- Water trucking
- The main organization dealing with water in Rhino camp is Danish refugee council.

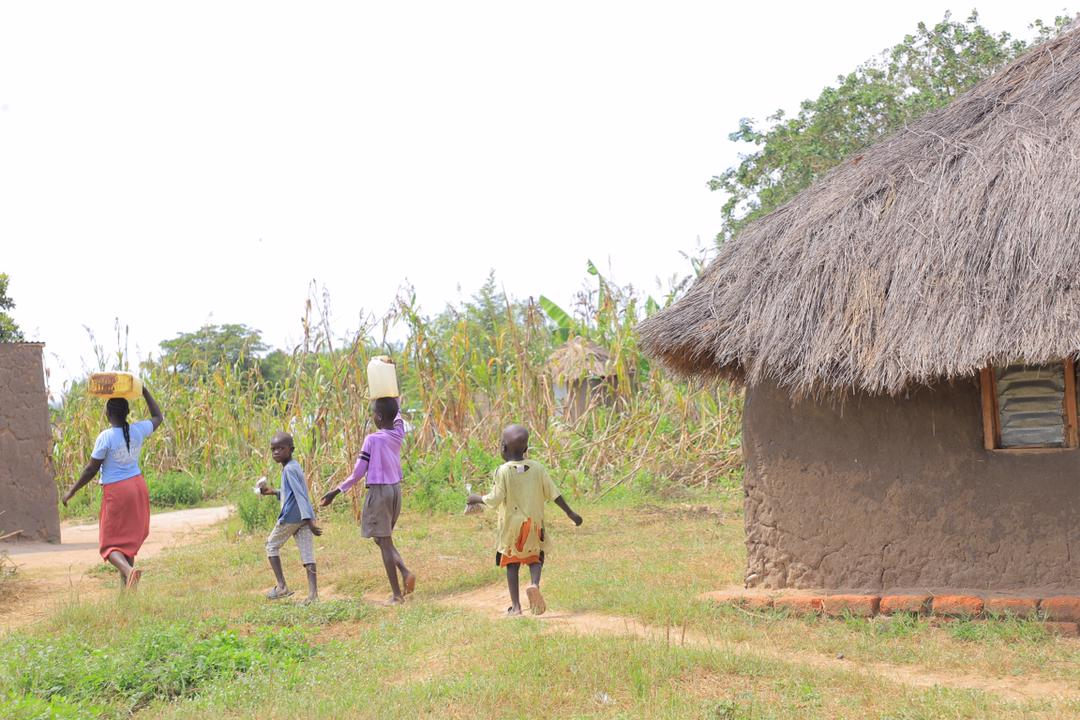
Children are trained to fetch water.

== Environment and natural resources ==
Two settlements of Rhino camp and Imvepi host 13% of the refugee population with majority women, children and youth hailing from South Sudan.

With the intense pressure on natural resources, refugees are conflicting with host communities on natural resources for survival, there is increased degradation of soils, water, tree cover leading to high temperatures, low water table, drought, irregular rainfall patterns, low crop yields, heavy winds that cause intense destruction to the temporary houses and food crops among others. With support from CARE International in Uganda, Rural Initiative for community West Nile, a local NGO based in Arua district in West Nile Sub region initiated climate action programs like planting of trees, recycling non biodegradable materials, and others. The refugees were also bedeviled with the inability to access natural energy when the need arises. This situation will spur them to rely heavily on unclean and nonrenewable energy sources such as charcoal, wood, traditional biomass, and kerosene which will eventually pollute the environment as these energy sources can emit high intensity of carbon content

Rhino camp is divided in to main regions, Upper Rhino and Lower Rhino, and each of these different segments of Rhino camp refugee settlement have a diverse texture and terrain in its lands, for example the upper part of Rhino which includes, Ofua zone, Omugo, Amuru and the rest has a rocky terrain, and the lower Rhino which includes Ocea zone, Eden zone, Odobu zone and the rest has a sandy terrain of soils which affects the farming.

== Social work environment ==
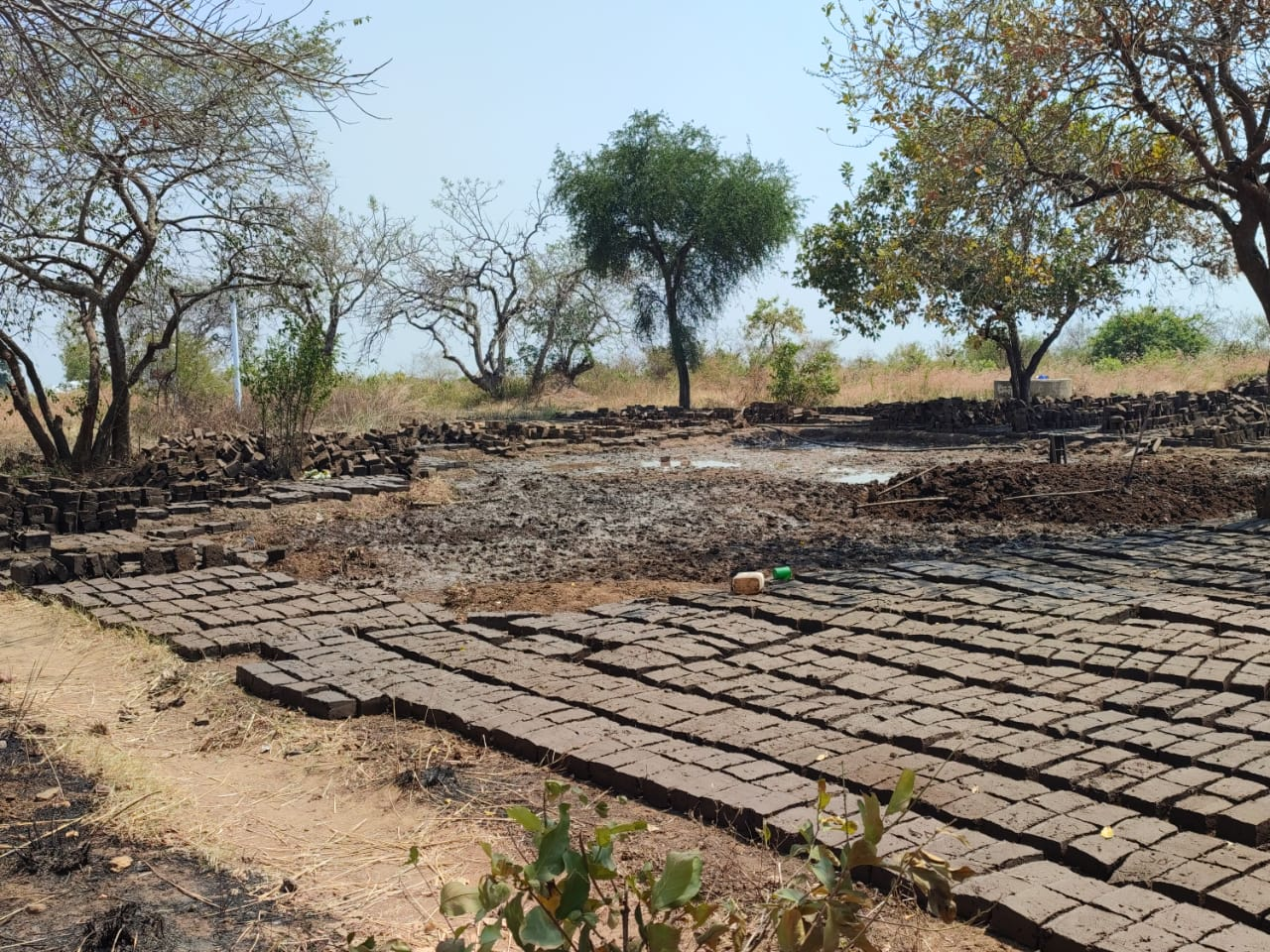
Refugees are laying Bricks for sale.

Rhino Camp refugee settlement is home to several community-led initiatives that work alongside partner organizations and donors to support refugees across various sectors. These initiatives are recognized by Uganda's Office of the Prime Minister and operate under district-level directives. Their activities include skills development, peacebuilding, social cohesion, gender equality, entrepreneurship, livelihood support, education and healthcare.

Some of the youths in rhino camp have been trained on how to make briquettes to improve their status of living by different organization like Kulika-Uganda, YSAT.

Since 2019 the camp has been the headquarters of the social initiative Community Creativity for Development (CC4D), which holds Repair Cafés where residents are trained to repair electronic devices such as mobile phones and computers.

== Relocation ==
Refugees in Rhino Camp lining up for relocation settlement

Due to the current influx of refugees, Rhino camp settlement has been a host to 116,000 in 2018. refugees with more still coming.

Upon arrival, refugees are registered and sent to reception centers where their data is taken and then they are transferred or relocated to settlements.

They receive social amenities and domestic items which include blankets, mats, solar lights, saucepans, and food.

pollution
