= Elema Refugee Settlement =

Ugandan refugee camp

Coordinates: 3°28′45″N 31°54′32″E

The Elema Refugee Settlement is a refugee settlement in Adjumani district, westnile sub-region of Uganda. Elema was established in 1992 and stands to be the oldest refugee settlement out of the total of nine settlement in Adjumani district. The settlement is composed entirely of refugees from the Kuku tribe of South Sudan. The Kuku speak a Bari dialect, also called Kuku. They are chiefly a farming people relying on mixed farming. Following a UNHCR-led repatriation of South Sudanese refugees in 2008 from Uganda, the Kuku ethnic group in Elema declined to be repatriated.

== Population ==
Elema has a total population of 876 registered refugees. With 170,029 nationals and 236,034 refugees in Adjumani District, refugees in Elema account for 0.2% of the district's population.

== Relationship with host community ==
They have as a community settled and integrated well with the mainly Madi people in the host community. Intermarriages are common between the two communities and there has been a harmonious sharing of natural resources such as land.

== Challenges ==
Elema has only one health centre, that is shared with Barutuku, which makes it very difficult for the refugees at Elema to access adequate medical treatment. There are only two operational hand pumps serving the whole settlement. This has over time created queues thus leading to long waiting time and tension among the refugees.
