= Terego District =

Terego
- District
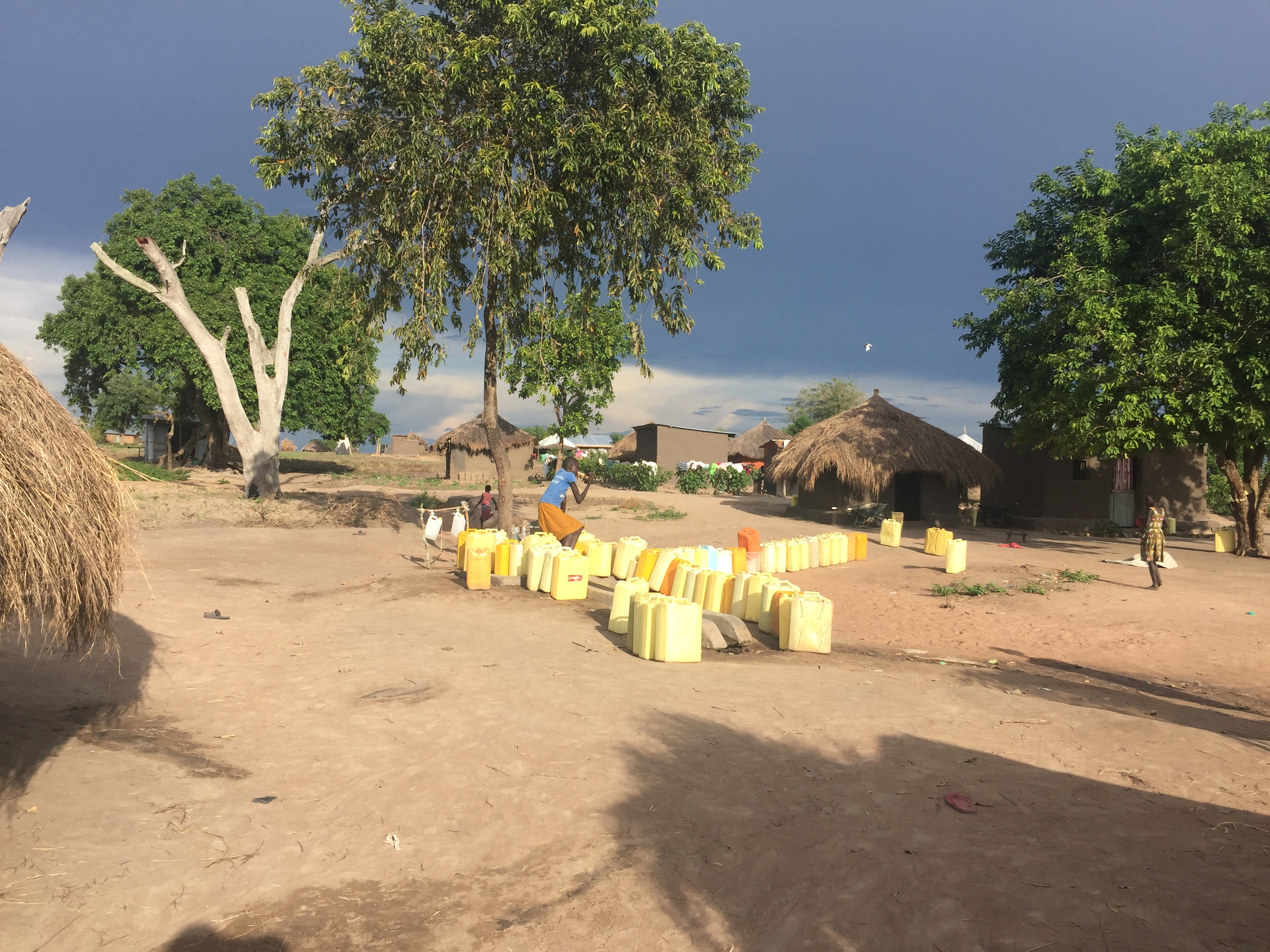
- Water supply point in the Rhino Camp Refugee Settlement

- Location of Terego District in Uganda
- Coordinates: 3.2°N 31.1°E
- Country: Uganda
- Region: Northern
- Established: 1 July 2020
- Capital: Leju

Area
  - Total: 1,102 km^{2} (425 sq mi)

Population (2014)
  - Total: 199,303
  - Density: 180.9/km^{2} (468.4/sq mi)
- Time zone: UTC+3 (EAT)

Terego is a district in Uganda's Northern Region, West Nile sub region, established on 1 July 2020 after being curved out of Arua district. It is located approximately 360 kilometres (220 mi) northwest of Uganda's capital Kampala. The administrative centre of the district is the trading centre of Leju in Aii-Vu Sub-County. Terego District covers an area of 1,102 square kilometres (425 sq mi) and the areas now making up the district recorded a non-refugee population of 323,200 in the 2024 Ugandan census. Terego District also hosts an estimated 168,000 refugees, mostly from South Sudan, in the Imvepi Refugee Settlement and the western zones of the Rhino Camp Refugee Settlement in the district.

== Geography ==
Terego District is located in the West Nile region of northern Uganda and is a new district created out of Arua district. It borders the districts of Yumbe to the north, Madi-Okollo to the east, Arua to the south, and Maracha to the west.

The district is drained by seasonal tributaries of the Albert Nile such as the Enyau River which contribute to local drainage patterns.

== History ==
Terego District is contiguous with the former Terego County, which was part of Arua District until 2006. That year, Maracha and Terego Counties were separated from Arua District to form Maracha–Terego District. After nearly five years of disagreement on where the headquarters of the new district should be located, Terego County opted to return to Arua District, leaving Maracha County to form Maracha District on its own. In May 2020, Parliament approved the creation of Terego District, which went into effect on 1 July 2020.

== Government ==
Terego District divided into two counties, Terego East and Terego West. Both counties are divided into three sub-counties: Terego East into Omugo, Udupi, and Uriama, and Terego West into Aii-Vu, Katrini, and Bileafe.

== Economy ==
Agriculture is the mainstay of the economy in Terego District. In the 2014 Ugandan census, 98.8% of households in Terego and Terego East Sub-Counties reported being engaged in agriculture. Major crops include beans, corn and sweet potatoes.
