= Kyaka II Refugee Settlement =

Kyaka II
- Refugee Camp
- Location within Uganda
- Coordinates: 0.48°N 31.05°E
- Country: Uganda

Area
  - Total: 81.5 km^{2} (31.5 sq mi)

Population (2026)
  - Total: 135,547
  - Density: 1,660/km^{2} (4,310/sq mi)

Kyaka II Refugee Settlement is a refugee camp in Kyegegwa District in western Uganda.

== Background ==
Kyaka II refugee settlement was established in 2003 to receive the remaining population of Kyaka following the mass repatriation of Rwandan refugees the same year. After this movement, Kyaka I was closed. Around mid-December 2017, renewed violence in DRC - Democratic Republic of Congo led to a new refugee influx into Uganda, with an estimated 17,000 new refugee arrivals in Kyaka II.

Since December 2016, Kyaka II's refugee population has quadrupled, following the arrival of tens of thousands of refugees from DRC fleeing conflict and inter-ethnic violence in North Kivu and Ituri. As of June 2026, there are 135,547 refugees already living in the settlement. Kyaka II is managed by the UNHCR and the Ugandan Office of the Prime Minister's Department of Refugees (OPM).

Kiyaka II also receives a lot of refugees from the Democratic Republic of Congo, such as the group of people called Ba Gegere Bahema, arrived in 2002-2008. There is another flux of refugees from the region of Bunia.

== Geography ==
Kyaka II encompasses 81.5 square kilometres in the three sub counties of Mpara, Kyegegwa and Kabweza in the eponymous Kyaka county. The settlement is divided into nine zones: Sweswe, Buliti, Bukere, Mukondo, Itambabiniga, Kakoni, Bwiriza, Byabakora and Kaborogota.

== Health care ==
Over 140,000 refugees visit Bujiubuli Health Centre III for medical treatment.

== See also ==
Kyegegwa District

UNHCR
