= Imvepi Refugee Settlement =

- Location within Uganda
- Coordinates: 3.2452°N 31.2841°E
- Country: Uganda

Imvepi Refugee Settlement is a refugee camp in Terego District (formerly part of Arua District) in West Nile Sub Region of northwestern Uganda.

== Background ==
The Imvepi refugee settlement, one of the newest opened, was established in February 2017 to accommodate South Sudanese asylum seekers fleeing the War at their country of origin; after the Palorinya refugee settlement in Moyo District quickly reached its full capacity and could not receive more immigrants because the influx needed an increase in the space provided and Imvepi refugee settlement was just the right option.

Imvepi Refugee settlement formed in 2016 after the formation of palorinya refugee settlement.

== History ==
Imvepi was and still remains a village, before and after the influx of the refugees, located in Terego District, Odupi Sub County, Terego county in Uganda. It is divided into three zones; 3 in the West; zone 2 in the Central and zone 1 in the East of which zone 1 has 12 villages, zone 2 has 20 villages, zone 3 has 8 villages and zone 4 has 7villages.

in response people have interest of planning more trees

impel refugee settlement in reasonable in community to planning more trees in camp to help them in heavy wind

=== Climate change ===
In response to climate change tree plantations and the woodlots has been established to curved down the rate of desertification that has been rampant in imvepi espacially within the base camp and outside the camp within the host community which has been done both by refugees with the support of partners like AIRD, DCA, WORLD VISION that really created a positive impact on the climate change

Water sources have been constructed almost in every village which are tab water being drilled from underground and be taken for treatment before being consumption that avoid and curve the use of open water which are easily contaminated that may later results to increase in the infection of disease in imvepi refugees settlement and it through the support of partners like OXFARM UGANDA, WATER MISSION that has been facilitating the distribution of safe and clean waters

== Refugee-led Organizations (RLOs) implementing climate change in imvepi refugee settlement ==
1. Youth empowerment to act ( YETA )
2. Community Transformation Agenda ( COTA )
3. Allvox
4. Peace Africa
5. women Action for Rural development Initiatives (WARDI)

== Education ==
Refugee parents reported children walk long distances to access education services and the school facilities being far and wide took most of their time and often costed them periods to accomplish in class.

=== Primary Schools and their locations ===
1. Annex Primary School located in village 5 zone 1
2. Lungamere Primary School located in village 10 zone 1
3. Emmanuel primary school located in village 1 zone 1
4. Imvepi primary school located in village 16 zone 2
5. Torit primary school located in village 18 zone 2
6. Inyau primary school located in the host community along Imvepi Arua road near Yinga health centre 3
7. Unity primary school located in village 4 zone 3
8. Lanya primary school located in village 14 zone 2
9. Apia primary school located in point F zone 2
10. Supiri primary school located in point E zone 22

== Health Centres ==
- Imvepi Healthy center II located in Point E, Zone II, Village 5.
- Yinga Health Centre III.

=== ECDs In Imvepi ===
1. New Hope
2. Emmanuel
3. Longamere
4. Hope for children
5. Light the nation
6. Royal international
7. Jakisa ECD in zone 4
8. Bright ECD in point I village 3
9. Bright future point H
10. Happy Angel zone 3

There is feeding program done by windle International Uganda to some of the ECDs that are facilitated by windle. Some of the ECD'S are facilitated by partners like BRAC international uganda, International rescue committee (IRC), save the children international and WARDI Uganda helps in community mobilization and sensitization.

==== Secondary schools ====
Imvepi refugee settlement has 2 secondary schools, Imvepi secondary school, located in village 16 zone 2 with two section of learning in it that's main stream and the AEP(accelerated education program) section of up to senior six with the total of 3571 students. Yikuru ss is located in village 4, zone 2 with a total of 2328 learners in both sections

Students do pay 20000 UShs as PTA fund to Carter other educational activities since teachers are being paid by the education implementing partners. Students also contribute food items to cater for their lunch despite food reduction by World Food Program.

== Water and Sanitation ==
According to UNICEF a total 70 per cent of refugees in Imvepi refugee Settlement have latrines which is a dire contribution for the improvement of the health and sanitation of those living in and around the refugee settlement of Imvepi and a good indicator that things are getting into control and the refugees at good hands. despite the fact that things are getting in to full control, refugees have to walk miles in search of water most especially during the dry spell and the long que at water points become delaying factor that they face.

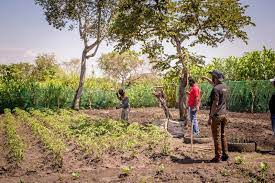

Tree plantation in Imvepi Refugee Settlement.
