= Adjumani District =

- District
- District location in Uganda
- Coordinates: 03°10′N 31°47′E
- Country: Uganda
- Region: Northern Region
- Sub-region: West Nile sub-region
- Capital: Adjumani

Area
  - Total: 3,030.9 km^{2} (1,170.2 sq mi)

Population (2012 Estimate)
  - Total: 375,800
  - Density: 124/km^{2} (320/sq mi)
- Time zone: UTC+3 (EAT)
- Website: www.adjumani.go.ug

Adjumani District is a district in Northern Uganda. Like most other Ugandan districts, it is named after its 'chief town', Adjumani, where the district headquarters are located.

== Location ==
Adjumani District is bordered by Moyo District to the north, South Sudan to the northeast, Amuru District to the east and south, Arua District to the southwest and Yumbe District to the northwest. The largest town in the district, Adjumani, is located approximately 125 kilometres (78 mi), by road, northeast of Arua, the largest city in the sub-region. This location lies approximately 436 kilometres (271 mi), by road, northwest of Kampala, the capital of Uganda and the largest city in that country. The district lies on the southern bank of the White Nile, just before it flows into South Sudan. The coordinates of the district are:03 23N, 31 47E (Latitude:3.3845; Longitude:31.7820).

== Overview ==
Adjumani District was created on May 17, 1997, when Moyo District was split into two. The eastern part of Moyo District was renamed Adjumani District, after its largest town, Adjumani. The western part of the old Moyo District, remained as the modern Moyo District.

In 1991, the national population census estimated the population of the district at about 96,300. The 2002 national census estimated the district population at about 202,300 people, of whom 49.6% were male and 50.4% were female. The annual district population growth rate has been determined to be 6.5%, between 2002 and 2012. It is estimated that the population of Adjumani District in 2019 was approximately 234,300.

Since 1991, the district has been host to refugee settlements, including Baratuku, Mungula II and the Maaji refugee settlements, housing successive waves of people displaced from South Sudan. As of 2018, the district is home to over 236,000 refugees.

== Economic activities ==
Agriculture is the backbone of Adjumani District's economy. Crops raised include

- Beans
- Maize
- Millet
- Simsim
- Mangoes
- Avocado
- Cassava
- Matooke
- Flowers
- Tobacco
- Groundnuts

== Prominent people ==
Prominent people from the district include the following:

- Lieutenant General (Retired) Moses Ali, LLB, Dip. Law. Pract., M.Mil.Sc., lawyer, politician and retired military officer. Currently serves as the third deputy prime minister and MP for "East Moyo County".
- Christine Dranzoa PhD, university professor, administrator, biologist, terrestrial ecologist and community leader. She is the Vice Chancellor of Muni University, one of the six public universities in Uganda.
- Jessica Eriyo, educator, social worker, politician and diplomat. Currently, she serves as the Deputy Secretary General of the East African Community, (EAC), responsible for Productive & Social Sectors
- Christine Ondoa MBChB, MMed, MPA, Dip.Pub.Adm., pediatrician, pastor and politician. She currently serves as the Director General of the Uganda AIDS Commission.

== See also ==
- Uganda
- Adjumani
- Moyo District
- Madi
- West Nile
- Uganda Districts
