= Madina Amin =

Forth wife to Idi Amin and traditional dancer

- Born: early 1950s (Age 67-76); Uganda Protectorate
- Occupations: Traditional dancer, Former First Lady of Uganda
- Known for: Fourth and favorite wife of Idi Amin, renowned traditional dancer
- Spouse: Idi Amin (m. 1972–2003; his death)
- Children: Abdu Nasser Mwanga, Hussein Kato, and three others

Madina Amin (born in the early 1950s) was Uganda's first lady, and artist (dancer). She was Idi Amin's fourth first lady and favorite wife. She was the first Muslim woman as the renowned traditional dancer. She was a traditional dancer with a group called Heart Beat of Africa and was drawn to Idi Amin for her dancing.

== Personal and political history ==
Madina Amin married Idi Amin in 1972 as his fourth wife because it was part of his efforts to marry from all the five regions of Uganda. She was the only wife out of the five wives that Idi Amin did not divorce, with the fifth wife, Kay Adroa alleged to be killed by Idi Amin. Madina Amin returned to Uganda after staying with Idi Amin for 20 years in exile. She had five children with Idi Amin. His sons are Abdu Nasser Mwanga, and Hussein Kato. She was among the officials being contacted for the plans by the current government under National Resistance Movement to construct a university in remembrance of Idi Amin. However the officials rejected the land for building the university in Garuga being a residential place, and some rejected the plan to build the university based on Amin's dark doings including human rights violation.

On 30 July 2003, in the morning, she was due at home in Kampala because she had flown to Saudi Arabia to attend to her ailing husband Idi Amin.

In recent years, Madina Amin also known as Madina Najjemba Amin made appeals to the president of Uganda regarding support and welfare. In 2024-2025 His excellency Yoweri Kaguta Museveni granted her a monthly salary allowance, a vehicle(4by4), housing provision following her request, this based on her status as the widow of a former head of state being recognized.

== See also ==
- Idi Amin
- First Lady of Uganda
- Heart beat of Africa
- Kay Adroa
- History of Uganda(1971–1979)
- Culture of Uganda
- Traditional dance in Uganda
