= Oraba =

- Location on the South Sudan–Uganda border Placement on map is approximate
- Coordinates: 03°32′06″N 30°53′24″E
- Country: Uganda
- Region: Northern Region
- Sub-region: West Nile sub-region
- District: Koboko District
- Elevation: 1,200 m (3,900 ft)

Oraba is a town in the Koboko District of the Northern Region of Uganda.

== Location ==
The town is in the northwestern corner of Uganda, close to the international borders with South Sudan and the Democratic Republic of the Congo (DRC). It is a few kilometres northeast of the South Sudan–Uganda–DRC tripoint. Oraba is in the West Nile sub-region, directly across the border from the city of Kaya, South Sudan.

The town is approximately 19 kilometres (12 mi), by road, northwest of Koboko, the site of the district headquarters. This is approximately 73 kilometres (45 mi), by road, north of Arua, the largest city in the West Nile sub-region. The coordinates of Oraba are 3° 32' 6.00"N, 30° 53' 24.00"E (Latitude:3.5350; Longitude:30.8900).

== Overview ==
The Vurra–Arua–Koboko–Oraba Road, whose upgrade to grade II bitumen surface began in 2012 facilitates the movement of people and goods through this busy trade corridor, serving Uganda, the DRC, and South Sudan.
