= Miriadua Falls =

Uganda Tourist Site

Coordinates: 3°11′02″N 30°56′41″E

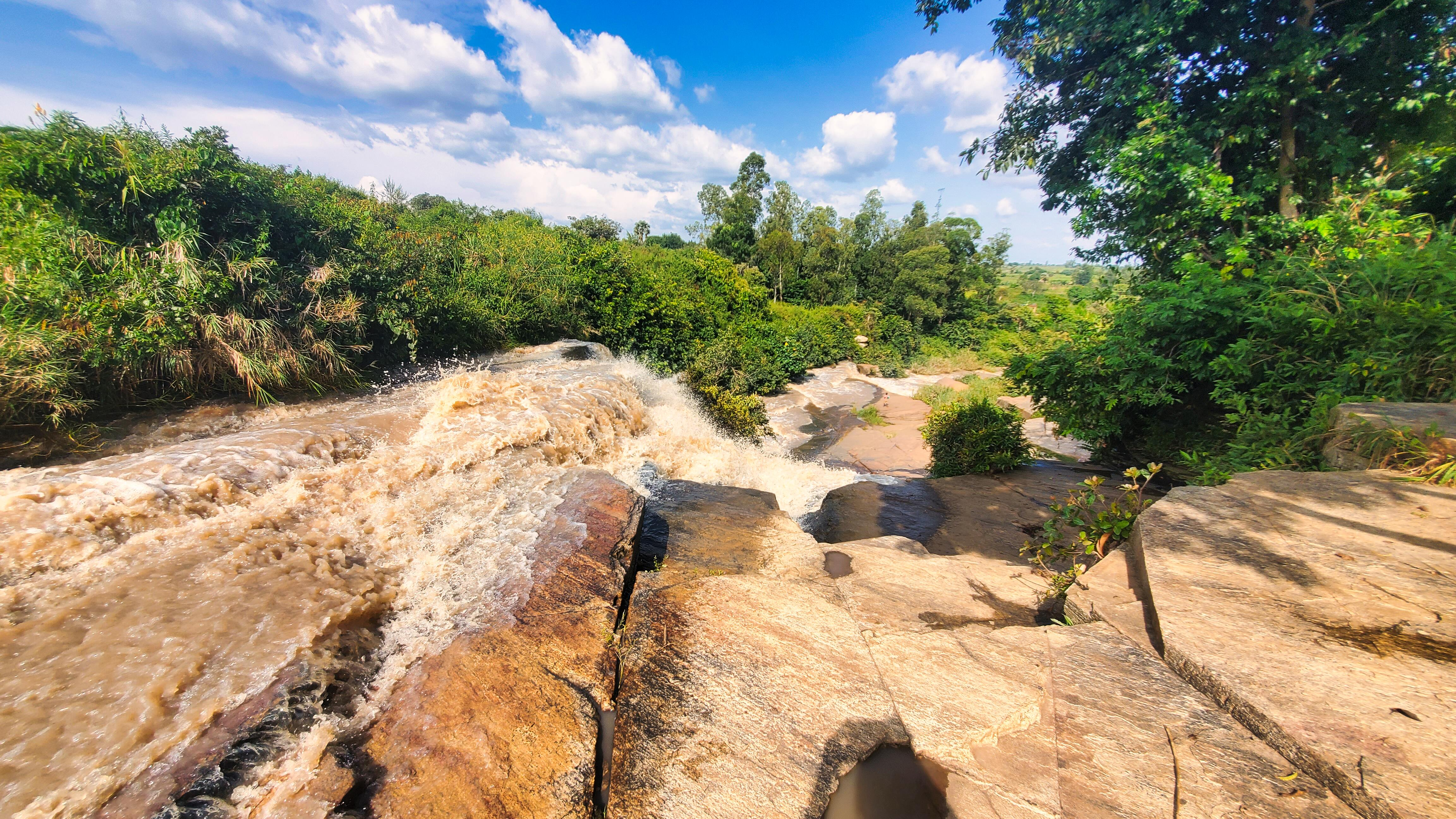

Physical characteristics
- Source
  - location: Maracha

Basin features
- Cities: Arua City
- Waterfalls: Miriadua Falls

Miriadua Falls (iniititially known as Kuru Falls) is a Ugandan tourist site found in Maracha on River Oluffe, over 20 kilometres north of Arua City.

== Location ==
Located in Lici Village, Kakua Parish, Kijomoro Sub-county, Maracha District, 2 km from Arua-Maracha road in river Oluffe.

Miriadua Falls in Maracha

== Activities ==
Miriadua Falls is not just a visual feature with cascading water plunging down rocky cliffs; it also provides opportunities for adventure. Visitors can engage in hiking and birdwatching, discovering the diverse wildlife that inhabits the surrounding areas. The nearby trails take you through scenic landscapes, offering panoramic views.

== Directions ==
Miriadua Falls is found off the Koboko Highway after Kijomoro, after cutting inwards next to the Kakwa Cope Centre signpost and moving forward for 2 kilometres until bending left before Ambidro Health Centre III, which can be identified by its blue ironsheet roofs. Taxis or bodabodas can drop people near there from Arua City in half an hour starting at about 5,000 UGX onwards.

== See also ==
Abairo Falls
