= Albertus Venter =

Albertus Venter may refer to:

- AJ Venter (born 1973), South African rugby union footballer
- Al J Venter (born 1938), South African war journalist, documentary filmmaker and author
