= Vurra–Arua–Koboko–Oraba Road =

Road in Uganda

Coordinates: 03°24′54″N 30°57′36″E

Route information
- Length: 57 mi (92 km)
- History: Designated in 2012; Expected completion in 2015

Major junctions
- South end: Vurra
- Arua; Koboko
- North end: Oraba

Location

Highway system
- Transport in

Vurra–Arua–Koboko–Oraba Road is a road in the Northern Region of Uganda, connecting the town of Vurra at the International border with the Democratic Republic of the Congo with the city of Arua, the town of Koboko, and the town of Oraba at the International border with the Republic of South Sudan.

== Location ==
The road starts at Vurra, and continues northwards through Arua and Koboko, ending in Oraba, a distance of approximately 92 kilometres (57 mi). The road connects the countries of DRC, Uganda and South Sudan.

== Upgrading to bitumen ==
The government of Uganda earmarked this road for upgrading through the conversion of the existing gravel road to bitumen surface and the building of bridges and drainage channels. Bids for engineering consultants were announced on 16 November 2009. Construction was flagged off on Friday, 11 May 2012 by president Museveni. The construction tender was awarded to Chongqing International Construction Corporation (CICO), who were expected to carry out the works over a 36 months period, at a cost of UGX:132 billion (approx. US $52.8 million at that time), borrowed from the World Bank. Having failed to meet the construction deadline of 31 December 2014, the road remains unfinished as at July 2015.

== See also ==
- Koboko District
- Maracha District
- Arua District
- Economy of Uganda
- UNRA
- List of roads in Uganda
