= Charles Ayume =

Ugandan politician (born 1985)

Member of Parliament Koboko Municipality
- Incumbent
- Assumed office 18 May 2021
- Preceded by: Evelyn Anite

Personal details
- Born: 5 March 1985 (age 41) Koboko, Uganda
- Party: NRM
- Parent: Francis Ayume (father) Elizabeth Ayume (mother)
- Occupation: Medical doctor, politician

Charles Ayume (born 5 March 1985) is a Ugandan medical doctor and politician. He is a member of the Ugandan Parliament representing Koboko Municipality, Koboko district in the 11th Parliament of Uganda on the ticket of the National Resistance Movement (NRM).

== Political career ==
Ayume ran in the NRM primary election against the incumbent MP and the State Minister of Finance Evelyn Anite, a strong supporter of President Yoweri Museveni.

== Clashes with the police ==
During the campaign for the primary election, Ayume's supporters and the police clashed after the police attempted to stop Ayume's campaign rally in an enforcement of COVID-19 guidelines. His supporters accused the police of bias in favour of his opponent, Anite, who held a campaign rally the previous day without disruption and went on to deface Anite's campaign posters. Ayume won the party's nomination with 8089 votes, defeating Anite, who polled 7321 to run in the general election. He won the general election and was sworn in on 17 May 2021, one month after the day his father, who had previously occupied the seat, died 17 years earlier on 17 April 2004.

Ayume served as chairperson of the health committee of Parliament.

== Personal life ==
His father, Francis Ayume, was a lawyer, politician and a member of Ugandan Parliament who occupied Koboko Municipality seat and was the speaker from 1998 to 2001 during the sixth parliament which was in session from 1996 to 2001. He served as attorney general until his death in an auto crash in 2004. Charles studied medicine and qualified to practice in 2004, the same year his father died.
