= Idi Amin =

President of Uganda from 1971 to 1979

His Excellency President for Life, Field Marshal Al-Hadji Doctor Idi Amin Dada VC, DSO, MC, CBE (Note: Idi Amin was never awarded the Distinguished Service Order or the Military Cross honors of the British Empire)
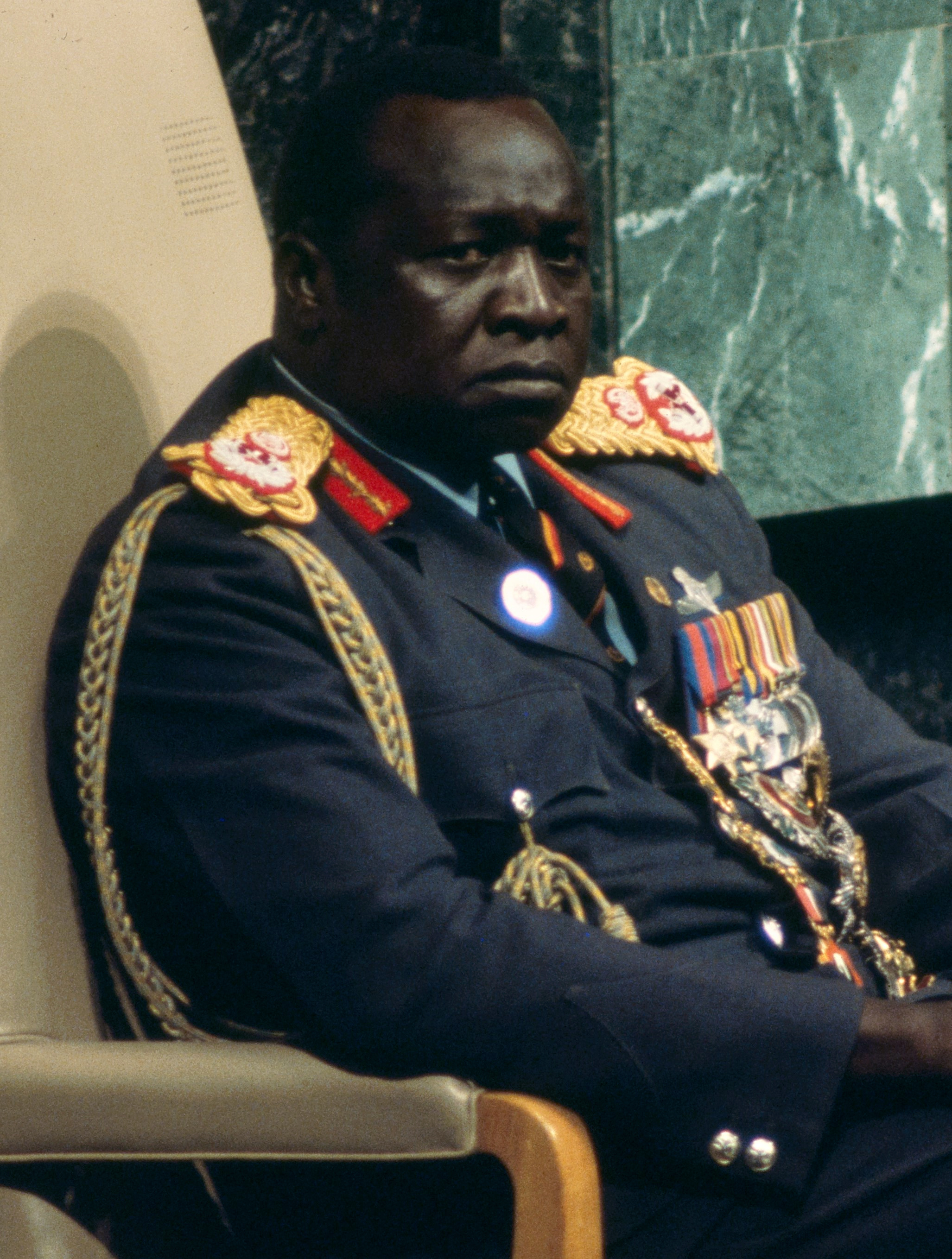
- Amin in the UNGA, 1975

3rd President of Uganda
- In office 25 January 1971 – 11 April 1979
- Vice President: Mustafa Adrisi
- Preceded by: Milton Obote
- Succeeded by: Yusuf Lule

Personal details
- Born: Awon'go Idi Amin Dada Oumee; 30 May 1928 Kampala, Uganda Protectorate
- Died: 16 August 2003 (aged 75) Jeddah, Saudi Arabia
- Resting place: Al Ruwais Cemetery, Jeddah, Saudi Arabia
- Spouses: At least 6, including: Malyamu (m. 1962; div. 1974) Kay (m. 1966; div. 1974) Nora (m. 1967; div. 1974) Madina (m. 1972) Sarah Kyolaba (m. 1975)
- Children: 43 (claimed)
- Relatives: Mustafa Adrisi; Isaac Maliyamungu; Juma Butabika; Isaac Lumago
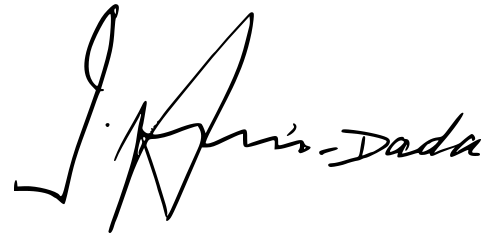
- Signature

Military service
- Allegiance: British Empire (1946–1962); Uganda (1962–1979)
- Branch/service: King's African Rifles (1946–1962); Uganda Army (1962–1979)
- Years of service: 1946–1979
- Rank: Lieutenant (British Empire); Field marshal (Uganda)
- Commands: Commander-in-Chief of the Uganda Army
- Battles/wars: Mau Mau Uprising; 1971 Ugandan coup d'état; 1972 invasion of Uganda; Uganda–Tanzania War

Awon'go Idi Amin Dada Oumee (Note: /ˈiːdi ɑːˈmiːn, ˈɪdi -/, UK also /- æˈmiːn/) (30 May 1928 – 16 August 2003) was a Ugandan military officer and dictator who served as the third president of Uganda from 1971 until his overthrow in 1979. He gained power after the 1971 Ugandan coup d'état and subsequently ruled the country under a regime characterized by rampant human rights abuses, economic mismanagement and corruption. International observers and human rights groups estimate that between 100,000 and 500,000 people were killed under his regime.

Amin was born to a Kakwa father and a Lugbara mother. In 1946, he joined the King's African Rifles, part of the British Colonial Army, as a cook. He rose to the rank of lieutenant, taking part in British actions against Somali rebels and then the Mau Mau Uprising in Kenya. Uganda gained independence from the United Kingdom in 1962, and Amin remained in the army, rising to the position of deputy army commander in 1964 and being appointed commander two years later. He became aware that Ugandan president Milton Obote was planning to arrest him for misappropriating army funds, so he overthrew Obote in 1971 and declared himself president.

During his years in power, Amin shifted from being a pro-Western ruler enjoying considerable support from Israel to being backed by Libya's Muammar Gaddafi, Zaire's Mobutu Sese Seko, the Soviet Union, and East Germany. In 1972, Amin expelled Asians, a majority of whom were Indian-Ugandans, leading India to sever diplomatic relations with his regime. In 1975, Amin assumed chairmanship of the Organisation of African Unity, an intergovernmental organisation designed to promote solidarity among African states (an annually rotating role). Uganda was a member of the United Nations Commission on Human Rights from 1977 to 1979. The United Kingdom broke diplomatic relations with Uganda in 1977, and Amin declared that he had defeated the British and added "CBE" to his title, for "Conqueror of the British Empire".

During the late 1970s there was increased unrest in Uganda, prompted by Amin's persecution of political dissidents and certain ethnic groups and also by the country's very poor international standing, a result of Amin's support for the 1976 hijacking that led to Israel's Operation Entebbe. He then attempted to annex Tanzania's Kagera Region in 1978. Tanzanian president Julius Nyerere ordered his troops to invade Uganda in response. Tanzanian Army and rebel forces successfully captured Kampala in 1979 and ousted Amin from power. Amin went into exile, first in Libya, then Iraq, and finally in Saudi Arabia, where he lived until his death in 2003.

== Early life ==
Virtually all retellings of Amin's early life are contradictory since he did not write an autobiography and never authorized a written account of his life. British governmental records put Amin's birth year as 1925; however, no records were kept for native Ugandans at the time. In a 1972 interview with Judith Hare, Amin gives his birthplace as the village of Koboko and his age as 46, which would make his birth year 1926. According to a book published in 1977 by Little, Brown and Company and written by a British adviser in Uganda using the pseudonym David Gwyn, Amin was born in Buganda, with his age given as 48, making his birth year 1928. The most comprehensive biography of Amin comes from his family based on oral tradition, which has some authority, but its details ultimately cannot be confirmed. Family tradition and Saudi authorities in Jeddah put his birth date as 10 Dhu al-Hijja 1346 in the Islamic calendar (30 May, 1928 in the Gregorian Calendar).

=== Early childhood and family ===
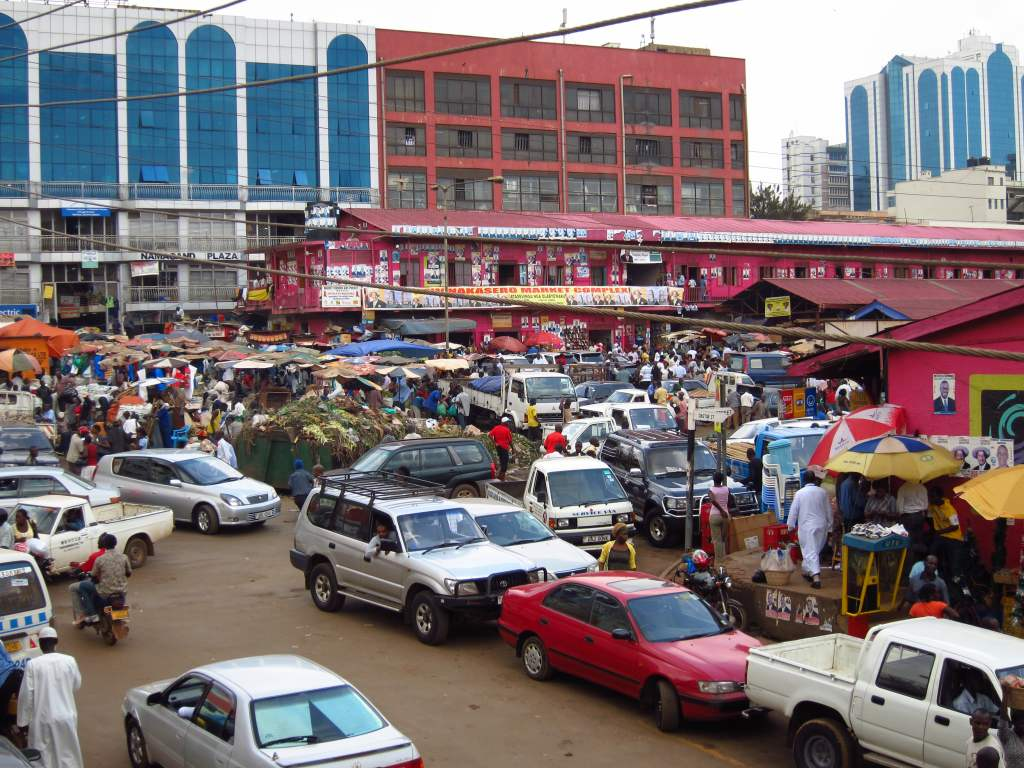
Nakasero Hill in Kampala, the district where Amin was born according to his family

According to Amin's family, Ugandan oral tradition and his Saudi death certificate, Idi Amin Dada Oumee was born on 30 May 1928 around 4 a.m. in his father's workplace, the Shimoni Police Barracks in Nakasero Hill, Kampala. He was given the name Idi after his birth on the Muslim holiday of Eid al-Adha. According to Fred Guweddeko, a researcher at Makerere University, Amin's birth name was Idi Awo-Ango Angoo. There is disagreement on the meaning of the name Dada, with some arguing that it meant ‘sister’ or ‘effeminate’ in Kiswahili, but most sources agree that Dada was a clan within the Kakwa tribe, which was observed over thirteen generations.

Amin was the third son born to Muslim parents, Amin Dada Nyabira Tomuresu (1889–1976), an ethnic Kakwa, and his second wife, Aisha Chumaru Aate (1904–1970), an ethnic Lugbara. His father, a Christian, was christened as a Roman Catholic and born with the name Andreas Nyabira Tomuresu. According to British journalist David Martin, Nyabira spent most of his life in South Sudan. Andreas converted to Islam in 1910 after being conscripted as a bugler by the colonial British army under his uncle, the Kakwa tribal leader, Sultan Ali Kenyi Dada, as a six-year-old child soldier and was given the name Amin Dada. He joined the Uganda Police in Kampala's Nsambia Police Barracks in 1913.

Nyabira was conscripted into the British King's African Rifles in 1914. He fought in the First World War as part of the East African campaign in Tanganyika before being honorably discharged in 1921 and given a plot of land in Arua District. The same year he joined the Protectorate Police Force in the Nsambia Police Barracks. He was transferred to the Shimoni Police Barracks in 1928, where, according to his family, Amin was born. He was later transferred to the Kololo Police Barracks before retiring from the police force in 1931, whereafter he worked at the Office of the Resident District Commissioner in Arua District.

His mother, Aisha Aate, was born to a Kakwa mother and Lugbara father. By all accounts Aate was a traditional healer, herbalist and a midwife. Ten years before Amin's birth, Aate joined the Allah Water (also known as Yakani) movement, which was an anti-colonial alternative medicine congregation centred on a "water of Yakan" that was infused with a psychedelic daffodil plant locally known as Kamiojo, described as the "LSD of Central Africa". The movement was repressed by British colonial authorities, who had judged it as rebellion. Despite being largely described as a cult, Amin's family claims that Aate was a priestess in the "Yakanye Order" which they explained as a "secret African society", of which Idi Amin was also a member, that used "sacred water and other mystical powers" for warfare.

According to Amin's family Aate had cured Irene Drusilla Namaganda, then Queen of Buganda and wife of Daudi Cwa II of Buganda, of her infertility. Aate's high-ranking role in the Allah Water movement allegedly gained the interest of the Bugandan royal family and her alleged connection to the family led to rumours of Amin's biological father being Daudi Chwa II. These rumours were reportedly spread by Nyabira's childless senior wife, who was spiteful of Aate bearing two children.

According to Amin's family, Idi Amin was given the title Awon'go (lit. 'noise'), in reference to rumours about his alleged paternity. Idi was reportedly chosen to take a paternity test as an infant by tribal elders, which involved abandoning him for four days in a forest near Mount Liru in Koboko, where they returned to find Amin still alive. The elders attributed this apparent miracle to Nakan, a sacred seven-headed snake in Kakwa folk religion. His brother and sister died in 1932, when Idi was four years old.

Amin's parents divorced when he was four, and most accounts suggest that he moved in with his mother's family in 1944 in the rural farming town of Mawale Parish, Luweero District, in north-western Uganda. The divorce of his parents was reportedly due to the lasting rumours regarding Idi's paternity, which angered his mother. Despite this, his family insists that he moved with his father according to Muslim tradition in Tanganyika Parish, Arua District, while his mother continued to practise healing in Buganda.

=== Childhood and education ===
While living with his mother's relatives, Amin reportedly worked as a goat farmer from ages eight to ten. In 1938, he moved to the home of Sheikh Ahmed Hussein in the nearby town of Semuto and began memorizing the Quran through recitation until he was 12. In 1940, Amin moved to Bombo and lived with his maternal uncle, Yusuf Tanaboo. He attempted to register for primary school but was rejected, reportedly owing to his paternal Nubian heritage.

The same year Amin was injured while participating in Nubian riots against discrimination at Makerere University in Wandegeya. He was enrolled in the Garaya madrasa in Bombo, continued memorizing the Quran under Mohammed Al Rajab until 1944 and reportedly won honours in recitation in 1943. Amin was conscripted into the colonial army alongside fifteen other students before being discharged for being underage.

In 1945 he moved to the Kiyindi Parish in Bwaise Parish and worked different odd jobs, including a stint as a doorman and concierge assistant at the Grand Imperial Hotel in Kampala.

== King's African Rifles ==
Amin joined the King's African Rifles in 1946 as an assistant cook, while at the same time receiving military training until 1947. In his later life, he falsely claimed to have served in the Burma Campaign of World War II. He was transferred to Kenya for infantry service as a private in 1947 and served in the 21st King's African Rifles infantry battalion in Gilgil, a Kenya Colony, until 1949. That year, his unit was deployed to northern Kenya to fight against Somali rebels.

In 1951, while Amin was in a camp at Nanyuki, his platoon commander Peter Garwood tasked him with ridding the camp of sex workers. Amin set out to do this with a pick-axe handle, using it to beat both soldiers and sex workers.

In 1952, Amin's brigade was deployed against the Mau Mau rebels in Kenya. He was promoted to corporal the same year, then to sergeant in 1953.

In 1959, Amin was made Effendi Class 2 (Warrant Officer), the highest possible rank for a black soldier in the King's African Rifles. Amin returned to Uganda the same year and received a short-service commission as a lieutenant on 15 July 1961, becoming one of the first two Ugandans to become commissioned officers. He was assigned to quell the cattle rustling between Uganda's Karamojong and Kenya's Turkana nomads. According to researcher Holger Bernt Hansen, Amin's outlook, behaviour and strategies of communication were strongly influenced by his experiences in the colonial military. This included his direct and hands-on leadership style which would eventually contribute to his popularity among certain parts of Ugandan society.

== Rise in the Uganda Army ==
Following Uganda's independence from the British Empire in 1962, Amin was promoted to captain and then to major in 1963. He was appointed Deputy Commander of the Army in 1964 and, the following year, to Commander of the Army. In 1970, he was promoted to commander of all the armed forces.

Amin was an athlete during his time in both the British and Uganda Army. At 1.93 m (6 ft 4 in) tall and powerfully built, he was the Ugandan light heavyweight boxing champion from 1951 to 1960, as well as a swimmer. Amin was also a formidable rugby forward, although one officer said of him: "Idi Amin is a splendid type and a good (rugby) player, but virtually bone from the neck up, and needs things explained in words of one letter". In the 1950s, he played for Nile RFC. There is a frequently repeated urban myth that he was selected as a replacement by the East Africa rugby union team for their 1955 tour match against the British Lions. Amin, however, does not appear in the team photograph or on the official team list.

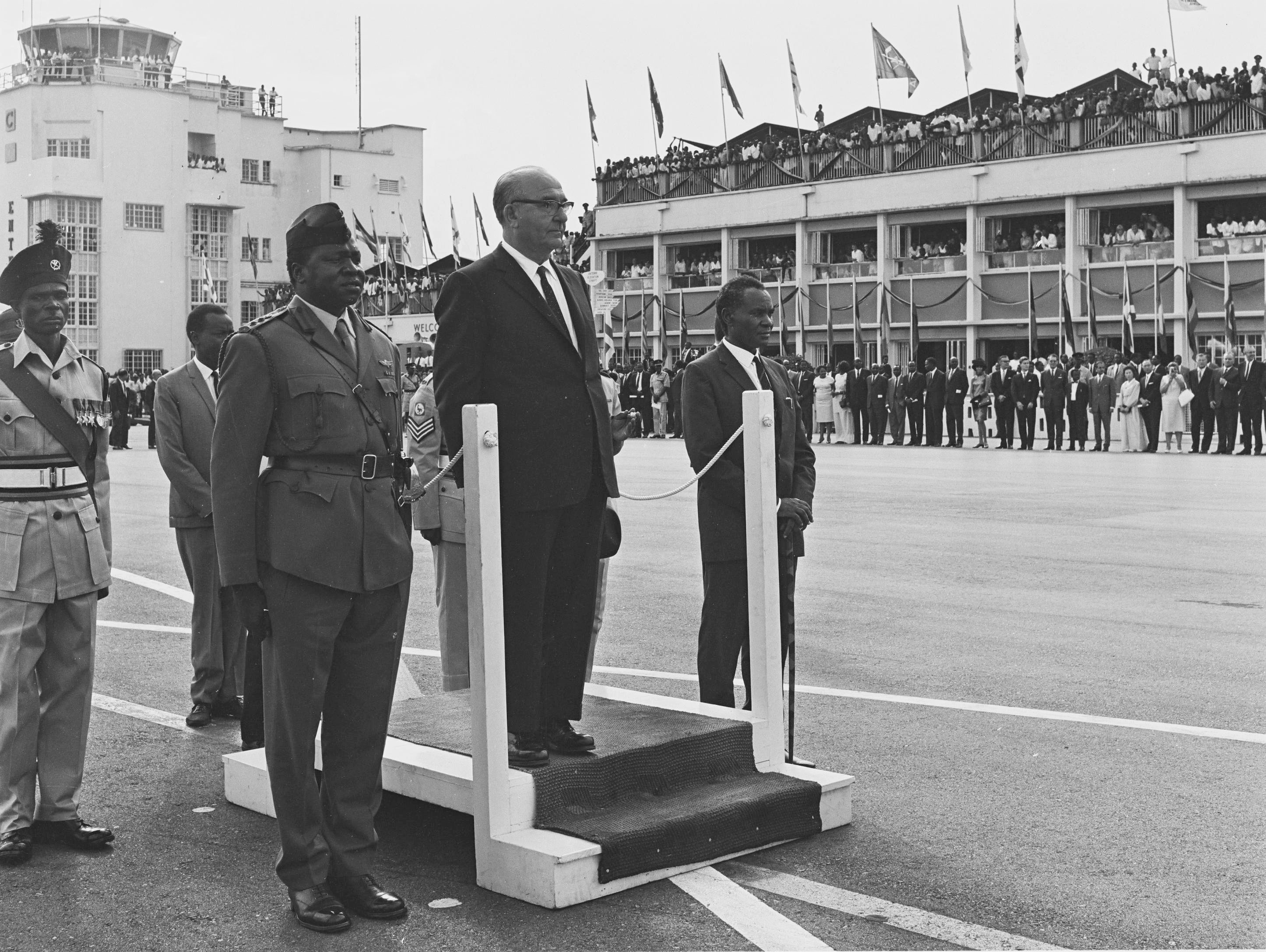
Amin (centre-left) as chief of staff during a visit of Israeli Prime Minister Levi Eshkol (centre) in 1966

In 1965, Prime Minister Milton Obote and Amin were implicated in a deal to smuggle ivory and gold into Uganda from the Democratic Republic of the Congo. The deal, as later alleged by General Nicholas Olenga, an associate of the former Congolese leader Patrice Lumumba, was part of an arrangement to help troops opposed to the Congolese government trade ivory and gold for arms supplies secretly smuggled to them by Amin. In 1966, the Ugandan Parliament demanded an investigation. Instead, Amin, who was then promoted to colonel, was appointed Chief of Army and Air Force Staff by Obote.

To end the political struggle with the opposition, Obote eventually imposed a new constitution abolishing the ceremonial presidency held by Kabaka (King) Mutesa II of Buganda and declared himself executive president. On Obote's orders, Amin led an attack by the Uganda Army on the Kabaka's palace in May 1966. Over 1,000 people were reportedly killed in the ensuing crisis. According to witnesses of the violence, Amin personally brutalised one civilian during the attack on the Kabaka's palace. He later delivered the Kabaka's presidential flag and military uniform as "trophies of the battle" to Obote's office. Mutesa managed to escape into exile to the United Kingdom, where he remained until his death in 1969. Amin subsequently led efforts to suppress any remaining opposition to the government in Buganda and other areas of Uganda. His readiness to aid Obote in crushing the Buganda royalists further boosted Amin's reputation with Obote, resulting in the soldier being promoted to brigadier general and commander of the Uganda Army in October 1966.

Over the next years, Amin continued efforts to suppress Buganda activists, focusing on dismantling the militant "Secret Council" and "Buganda Liberation Army". Amin began recruiting members of Kakwa, Lugbara, South Sudanese, and other ethnic groups from the West Nile area bordering South Sudan. The South Sudanese had been residents in Uganda since the early 20th century, having come from South Sudan to serve the colonial army. Many African ethnic groups in northern Uganda inhabit both Uganda and South Sudan; allegations persist that Amin's army consisted mainly of South Sudanese soldiers.

== Seizure of power ==
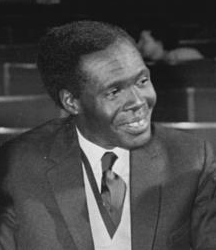
Milton Obote, Uganda's second president, whom Amin overthrew in a coup d'état in 1971

Eventually a rift developed between Amin and Obote, exacerbated by the support Amin had built within the Uganda Army by recruiting from the West Nile region (his region of origin), his involvement in operations to support the rebellion in southern Sudan and an attempt on Obote's life in 1969. In October 1970, Obote took control of the armed forces, reducing Amin from his months-old post of commander of all the armed forces to that of the commander of the Uganda Army.

Having learned that Obote was planning to arrest him for misappropriating army funds, Amin seized power in a military coup with the assistance of Israeli government agents on 25 January 1971, while Obote was attending that year's Commonwealth summit meeting in Singapore. Troops loyal to Amin sealed off Entebbe International Airport and took Kampala. Soldiers surrounded Obote's residence and blocked major roads. A broadcast on Radio Uganda accused Obote's government of corruption and preferential treatment of the Lango region. Cheering crowds were reported in the streets of Kampala after the radio broadcast. Amin, who presented himself a soldier, not a politician, declared that the military government would remain only as a caretaker regime until new elections, which would be held when the situation was normalised. He promised to release all political prisoners.

Amin held a state funeral in April 1971 for Edward Mutesa, former king (kabaka) of Buganda and president, who had died in exile.

== Presidency ==
=== Establishment of military rule ===
On 2 February 1971, one week after the coup, Amin declared himself President of Uganda, Commander-in-Chief of the Armed Forces, Uganda Army Chief of Staff, and Chief of Air Staff. He suspended certain provisions of the Ugandan constitution, and soon instituted an Advisory Defense Council composed of military officers with himself as the chairman. Amin placed military tribunals above the system of civil law, appointed soldiers to top posts in government and government-owned corporations, and informed the newly inducted civilian cabinet ministers that they would be subject to military courtesy. Amin ruled by decree; over the course of his rule he issued approximately 30 decrees.

Amin renamed the presidential lodge in Kampala from Government House to "The Command Post". He disbanded the General Service Unit, an intelligence agency created by the previous government, and replaced it with the State Research Bureau. The bureau headquarters in the Kampala suburb of Nakasero became the scene of torture and capital punishment over the next few years. Other agencies used to persecute dissenters included the military police and the Public Safety Unit.

Obote took refuge in Tanzania, having been offered sanctuary there by the Tanzanian President Julius Nyerere. Obote was soon joined by 20,000 Ugandan refugees fleeing Amin. The exiles attempted but failed to regain Uganda in 1972, through a poorly organised coup attempt.

=== Persecution of ethnic and political groups ===
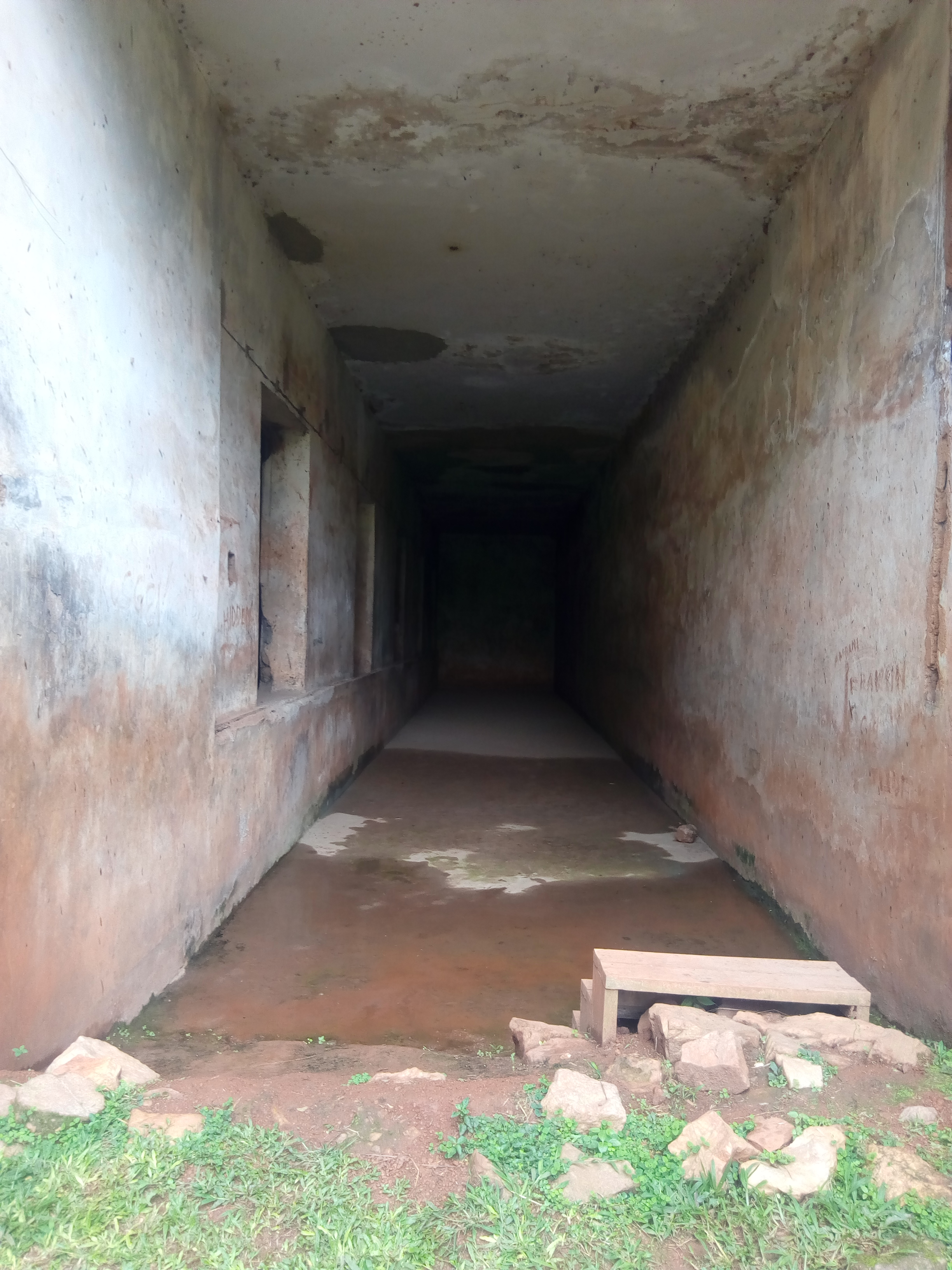
Many victims of Amin's regime perished in torture chambers during his reign. One such chamber is pictured.

Amin retaliated against the attempted invasion by Ugandan exiles in 1972 by purging the Uganda Army of Obote supporters, predominantly those from the Acholi and Lango ethnic groups. In July 1971, Lango and Acholi soldiers had been massacred in the Jinja and Mbarara barracks. In this atmosphere of violence, many other people were killed for criminal motives or simply at will. Bodies were often dumped into the River Nile.

The killings, motivated by ethnic, political, and financial factors, continued throughout Amin's eight years in control. The exact number of people killed is unknown. The International Commission of Jurists estimated the death toll at no fewer than 80,000 and more likely around 300,000. An estimate compiled by exile organisations with the help of Amnesty International puts the number killed at 500,000.

In his 1977 book State of Blood: The Inside Story of Idi Amin, Henry Kyemba (who was Minister of Health for three years in Amin's cabinet) states that "Amin's bizarre behavior derives partly from his tribal background. Like many other warrior societies, the Kakwa, Amin's tribe, are known to have practiced blood rituals on slain enemies. These involve cutting a piece of flesh from the body to subdue the dead man's spirit or tasting the victim's blood to render the spirit harmless. Such rituals still exist among the Kakwa. Amin's practices do not stop at tasting blood: on several occasions he has boasted to me and others that he has eaten human flesh." (Kyemba 109–110)

Among the most prominent people killed were Benedicto Kiwanuka, a former prime minister and chief justice; Janani Luwum, the Anglican archbishop; Joseph Mubiru, the former governor of the central bank of Uganda; Frank Kalimuzo, the vice-chancellor of Makerere University; Byron Kawadwa, a prominent playwright; and two of Amin's own cabinet ministers, Erinayo Wilson Oryema and Charles Oboth Ofumbi.

Amin recruited his followers from his own ethnic group, the Kakwas, along with South Sudanese, and Nubians. By 1977, these three groups formed 60 percent of the 22 top generals and 75 percent of the cabinet. Similarly, Muslims formed 80 percent and 87.5 percent of these groups even though they were only 5 percent of the population. This helps explain why Amin survived eight attempted coups. Largely a mercenary force, the Ugandan military grew from 10,000 to 25,000 by 1978. Half the soldiers were South Sudanese and 26 percent were Congolese, with only 24 percent being Ugandan, mostly Muslim and Kakwa.

We are determined to make the ordinary Ugandan master of his own destiny and, above all, to see that he enjoys the wealth of his country. Our deliberate policy is to transfer the economic control of Uganda into the hands of Ugandans, for the first time in our country's history.

— Idi Amin on the persecution of minorities

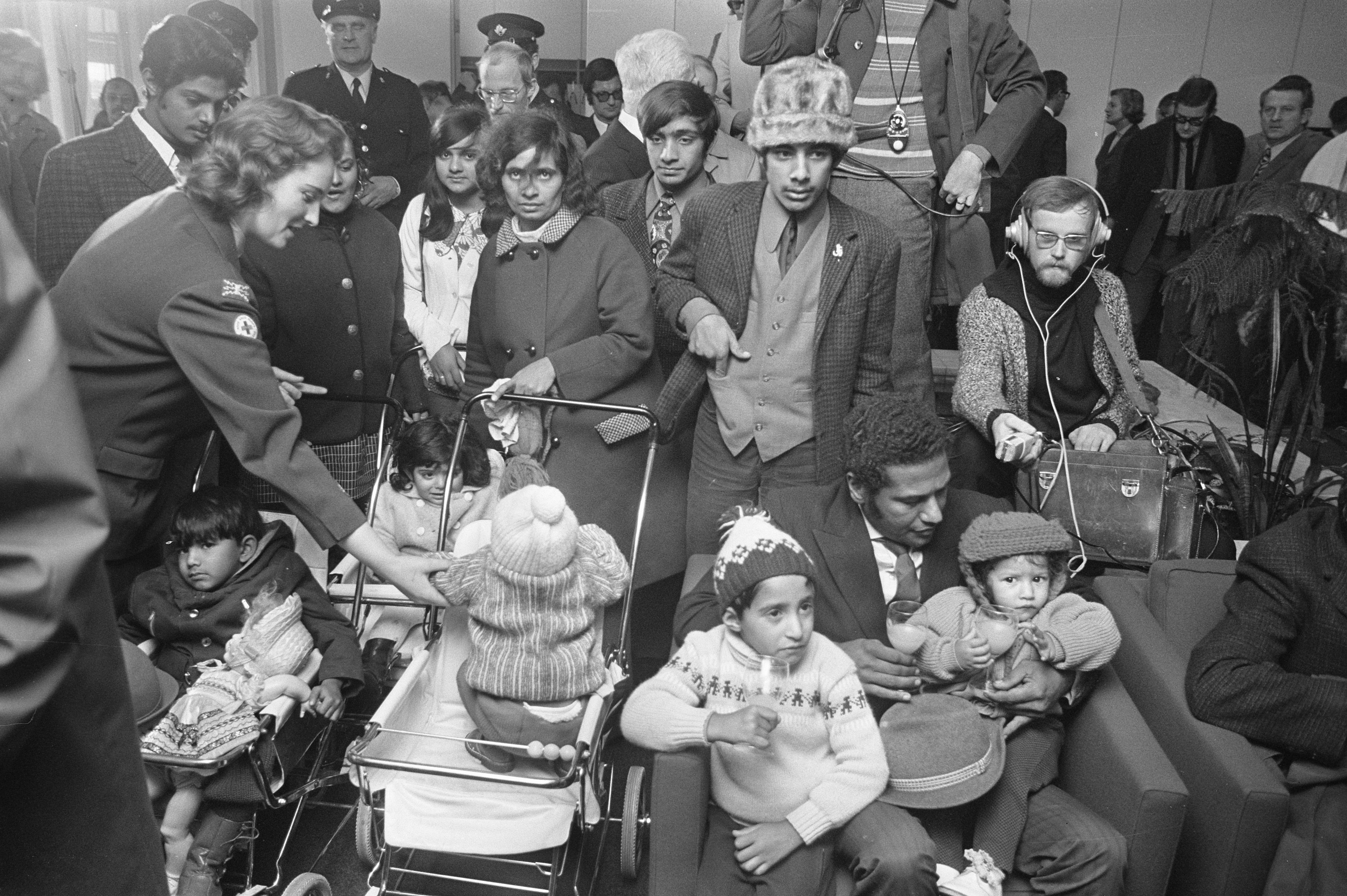
Refugees of Uganda's Asian Community in the Netherlands, November 1972

On August 4, 1972, Amin declared what he called an "economic war", a set of policies that included the expropriation of properties owned by Asians and Europeans. Uganda's 80,000 Asians were mostly from the Indian subcontinent and born in the country, their ancestors having come to Uganda in search of prosperity when India was still a British colony. Many owned businesses, including large-scale enterprises, which formed the backbone of the Ugandan economy. He referred to Asians as the "Brown Jews" because of their dominance in commerce and their perceived economic control.

On 4 August 1972, Amin issued a decree ordering the expulsion of the 50,000 Asians who were British passport holders. This was later amended to include all 60,000 Asians who were not Ugandan citizens. Amin claimed that he had a dream in which God told him he must expel all Asians for the welfare of Uganda. Furthermore, he believed that Asians were sabotaging the economy of Uganda. Additionally, the reasons articulated by Amin suggest a racial basis for the expulsion. Around 30,000 Ugandan Asians emigrated to the UK. Others went to Commonwealth countries such as Australia, South Africa, Canada, and Fiji, or to India, Kenya, Pakistan, Sweden, Tanzania, and the United States. Amin expropriated businesses and properties belonging to the Asians and the Europeans and handed them over to his supporters. Without the experienced owners and proprietors, businesses were mismanaged and many industries collapsed from lack of operational expertise and maintenance. This proved disastrous for the already declining Ugandan economy. At the time, Asians accounted for 90% of the country's tax revenue; with their removal, Amin's administration lost a large chunk of government revenue. The economy all but collapsed.

Idi Amin murdered an estimated 500 Yemeni Hadrami Arab merchants.

In 1975, Emmanuel Bwayo Wakhweya, Amin's finance minister and longest-serving cabinet member at the time, defected to London. This prominent defection helped Henry Kyemba, Amin's health minister and a former official of the first Obote regime, to defect in 1977 and resettle in the UK. Kyemba wrote and published A State of Blood, the first insider exposé of Amin's rule.

On 25 June 1976, the Defense Council declared Amin president for life.

=== International relations ===
Amin during the inauguration of William Tolbert, 20th president of Liberia, in 1976

Initially, Amin was supported by Western powers such as Israel, West Germany, and, in particular, the United Kingdom. During the late 1960s, Obote's move to the left, which included his Common Man's Charter and the nationalisation of 80 British companies, had made the West worried that he posed a threat to Western capitalist interests in Africa and could make Uganda an ally of the Soviet Union. Amin, who had served with the King's African Rifles and taken part in Britain's violent suppression of the Mau Mau uprising prior to Ugandan independence, was known by the British as "intensely loyal". This made him an obvious choice as Obote's successor. Although some have claimed that Amin was being groomed for power as early as 1966, the plotting by the British and other Western powers began in earnest in 1969, after Obote had begun his nationalisation programme.

Throughout the first year of his presidency, Amin received key military and financial support from the United Kingdom and Israel. In July 1971 he visited both countries and asked for advanced military equipment, but the states refused to provide hardware unless the Ugandan government paid for it. Amin decided to seek foreign support elsewhere and in February 1972 he visited Libya. Amin denounced Zionism, and in return Libyan leader Muammar Gaddafi pledged Uganda an immediate $25 million loan to be followed by more lending from the Libyan–Ugandan Development Bank. Over the following months Amin successively removed Israeli military advisers from his government, expelled all other Israeli technicians, and broke diplomatic relations. Gaddafi also mediated a resolution to long-standing Ugandan–Sudanese tensions, with Amin agreeing to stop backing Anyanya rebels in southern Sudan and instead recruit the former guerilla fighters into his army.

In 1972, Ugandan–Israeli relations dramatically worsened. To ally Uganda with Libya, Amin expelled 500 Israelis from Uganda and severed diplomatic ties with Israel. Uganda had also owed Israel between $13 million to $18 million that it could not pay. Later that year, Amin sent a telegram to UN Secretary-General Kurt Waldheim, Israeli prime minister Golda Meir, and Palestinian leader Yasser Arafat stating that "the Israelis are not people working in the interest of the people of the world". He praised the Munich massacre, expressed sympathy with Adolf Hitler, approved of the Holocaust, and envisioned the ethnic cleansing of Jews from the Middle East. The United States responded by delaying a US$3 million loan to Uganda.

Following the expulsion of Ugandan Asians in 1972, most of whom were of Indian descent, India severed diplomatic relations with Uganda. The same year, as part of his "economic war", Amin broke diplomatic ties with the United Kingdom and nationalised all British-owned businesses. The United Kingdom and Israel ceased all trade with Uganda, but this commercial gap was quickly filled by Libya, the United States, and the Soviet Union.

The Soviet Union under Leonid Brezhnev grew increasingly interested in Uganda as a strategic counterbalance to perceived Chinese influence in Tanzania and Western influence in Kenya. It dispatched a military mission to Uganda in November 1973. While it could not supply the financial level available from the Western powers, the Soviet Union opted to provide Amin with military hardware in exchange for his support. The Soviet Union quickly became Amin's largest arms supplier, sending Uganda tanks, jets, artillery, missiles, and small arms. By 1975, it was estimated that the Soviets had provided Amin's government with $12 million in economic assistance and $48 million in arms. Amin also sent several thousand Ugandans to Eastern Bloc countries for military, intelligence, and technical training, especially Czechoslovakia. East Germany was involved in the General Service Unit and the State Research Bureau, the two agencies that were most notorious for terror. During the Ugandan invasion of Tanzania in 1979, East Germany attempted to remove evidence of its involvement with these agencies.

In December 1973, Amin launched a sarcastic 'Save Britain Fund' during the 1973–1975 recession to "save and assist our former colonial masters from economic catastrophe", while offering emergency food supplies and urging Ugandans to donate. In 1974, he offered to host and mediate negotiations to end the conflict in Northern Ireland, believing that Uganda's position as a former British colony made it apt to do so.

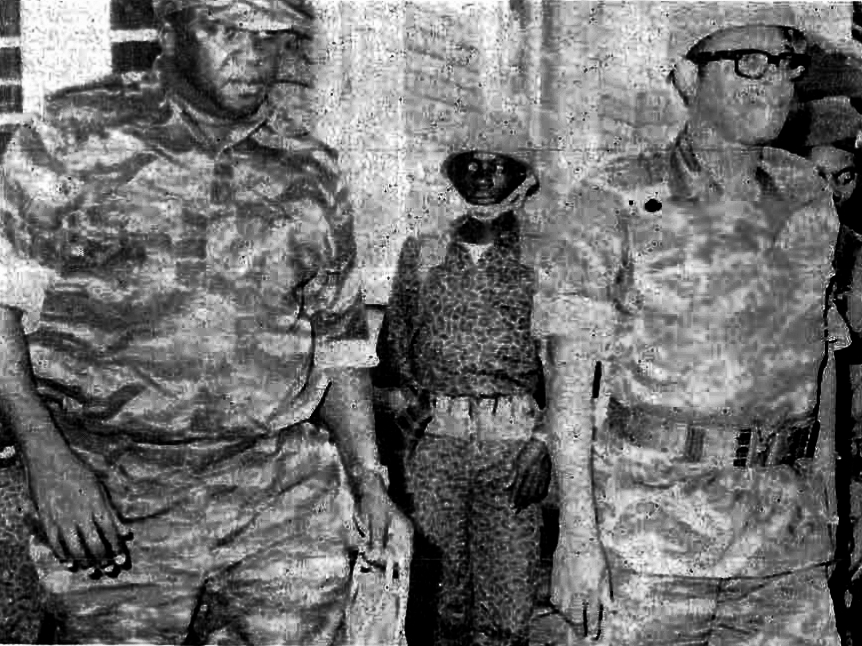
Amin visits the Zairian dictator Mobutu during the Shaba I conflict in 1977.

In June 1976, Idi Amin allowed an Air France airliner that had been scheduled to fly from Tel Aviv to Paris but had been hijacked by two members of the Popular Front for the Liberation of Palestine – External Operations and two members of the German Revolutionäre Zellen to land at Entebbe Airport. The hijackers were joined there by three more. Soon after, 156 non-Jewish hostages who did not hold Israeli passports were released and flown to safety, while 83 Jews and Israeli citizens, as well as 20 others who refused to abandon them (among whom were the captain and crew of the hijacked jet), continued to be held hostage. In the subsequent Israeli rescue operation, codenamed Operation Thunderbolt (popularly known as Operation Entebbe), on the night of 3–4 July 1976, a group of Israeli commandos flew in from Israel and seized control of Entebbe Airport, freeing nearly all the hostages. Three hostages died during the operation and 10 were wounded; seven hijackers, about 45 Ugandan soldiers, and one Israeli soldier, Yoni Netanyahu (the commander of the unit), were killed. A fourth hostage, 75-year-old Dora Bloch, an elderly Jewish Englishwoman who had been taken to Mulago Hospital in Kampala before the rescue operation, was subsequently murdered in reprisal. The incident further soured Uganda's international relations, leading the United Kingdom to close its High Commission in Uganda. In retaliation for Kenya's assistance in the raid, Amin also ordered the killing of hundreds of Kenyans living in Uganda.

Uganda under Amin embarked on a large military build-up, which raised concerns in Kenya. Early in June 1975, Kenyan officials impounded a large convoy of Soviet-made arms en route to Uganda at the port of Mombasa. Tension between Uganda and Kenya reached its climax in February 1976, when Amin announced that he would investigate the possibility that parts of southern Sudan and western and central Kenya, up to within 32 kilometres (20 mi) of Nairobi, were historically a part of colonial Uganda. The Kenyan Government responded with a stern statement that Kenya would not part with "a single inch of territory". Amin backed down after the Kenyan army deployed troops and armoured personnel carriers along the Kenya–Uganda border. Amin's relations with Rwanda were tense, and during his tenure he repeatedly jeopardised its economy by denying its commercial vehicles transit to Mombasa and made multiple threats to bomb Kigali.

=== War with Tanzania and deposition ===
In January 1977 Amin appointed General Mustafa Adrisi Vice President of Uganda. That year, a split in the Uganda Army developed between supporters of Amin and soldiers loyal to Adrisi, who held significant power in the government and wanted to purge foreigners, particularly Sudanese, from the military. The growing dissatisfaction in the Uganda Army was reflected by frequent coup attempts; Amin was even wounded during one of them, namely Operation Mafuta Mingi in June 1977. By 1978, the number of Amin's supporters and close associates had shrunk significantly, and he faced increasing dissent from the populace within Uganda as the economy and infrastructure collapsed as a result of the years of neglect and abuse. After the killings of Bishop Luwum and ministers Oryema and Oboth Ofumbi in 1977, several of Amin's ministers defected or fled into exile. In early 1978, Adrisi was severely injured in a car accident and flown to Cairo for treatment. While he was there, Amin stripped him of his positions as Minister of Defense and Minister of Home Affairs and denounced him for retiring senior prison officials without his knowledge. Amin then proceeded to purge several high-ranking officials from his government and took personal control of several ministerial portfolios. The shakeup caused political unrest and especially angered Adrisi's followers, who believed that the car accident was a failed assassination attempt.

In November 1978, troops loyal to Adrisi mutinied. Amin sent troops against the mutineers, some of whom had fled across the Tanzanian border. Fighting consequently broke out along that border, and the Uganda Army invaded Tanzanian territory under unclear circumstances. According to several experts and politicians, Amin directly ordered the invasion in an attempt to distract the Ugandan military and public from the crisis at home. Other accounts suggest, however, that Amin had lost control of parts of the Uganda Army, so Amin's sanction for the invasion was a post-facto action to save face regarding troops who had acted without his orders. In any case, Amin accused Tanzanian President Julius Nyerere of initiating the war against Uganda after the hostilities had erupted, and proclaimed the annexation of a section of Kagera when the Ugandan invasion initially proved to be successful. However, as Tanzania began to prepare a counter-offensive, Amin reportedly realised his precarious situation, and attempted to defuse the conflict without losing face. The Ugandan President publicly suggested that he and Nyerere participate in a boxing match which, in lieu of military action, would determine the outcome of the conflict. (Note: Amin also proposed that Muhammad Ali could act as referee. Researcher Alicia C. Decker reasoned that the suggestion of a boxing match was supposed to "bolster [Amin's] masculinity" and thereby showcase that he remained a strong leader in the face of mounting opposition to his regime. Accordingly, the proposal was mostly directed toward a Ugandan audience, and part of Amin's "performative" ruling style.) Nyerere ignored the message.

In January 1979, Nyerere mobilised the Tanzania People's Defence Force and counterattacked, joined by several groups of Ugandan exiles who had united as the Uganda National Liberation Army. Amin's army retreated steadily, despite military help from Libya's Muammar Gaddafi and the Palestine Liberation Organisation. The President reportedly made several trips abroad to other countries such as Saudi Arabia and Iraq during the war, attempting to enlist more foreign support. He made few public appearances in the final months of his rule, but spoke frequently on radio and television. Following a major defeat in the March 1979 Battle of Lukaya, parts of the Uganda Army command reportedly urged Amin to step down. He angrily refused and declared: "If you don't want to fight, I'll do it myself." He consequently fired chief of staff Yusuf Gowon. Amin personally oversaw the defence of Kampala's environment, and reportedly came close to being killed by the Tanzanians. However, Amin fled the Ugandan capital by helicopter on 11 April 1979, when Kampala was captured. After a short-lived attempt to rally some remnants of the Uganda Army in eastern Uganda which reportedly included Amin proclaiming the city of Jinja his country's new capital, he fled into exile. By the time of his removal from power, Amin had become deeply unpopular in Uganda. The symbols of his rule, his pictures, and buildings associated with him were subject to vandalism during and after the war.

== Bounty ==
Upon Amin's fleeing into exile, the October 1979 issue of the American magazine Soldier of Fortune offered a bounty of $10,000 in gold to anyone providing information that resulted in the live capture of Amin. Robert K. Brown, the magazine's publisher, was quoted as saying, "We take exception to the kind of individual Amin is. He should be brought to trial and, after being tried by a jury of his peers, punished."

== Exile ==
Idi Amin first escaped to Libya, where he stayed until 1980, and ultimately settled in Saudi Arabia, where the Saudi royal family allowed him sanctuary and paid him a generous subsidy in return for staying out of politics. Amin lived for a number of years on the top two floors of the Novotel Hotel on Palestine Road in Jeddah. Brian Barron, who covered the Uganda–Tanzania War for the BBC as chief Africa correspondent, together with cameraman Mohamed Amin (no relation) of Visnews in Nairobi, located Amin on 4 June 1980, and secured the first interview with him since his deposition. While in exile, Amin funded remnants of his army that fought in the Ugandan Bush War. Though he continued to be a controversial figure, some of Amin's former followers as well as several rebel groups continued to fight in his name for decades and occasionally advocated for his amnesty and even his restoration to the Ugandan Presidency. During interviews he gave during his exile in Saudi Arabia, Amin held that Uganda needed him and never expressed remorse for the brutal nature of his regime.

In January 1989, Amin left his exile without authorisation by the Saudi Arabian government and flew alongside one of his sons to Zaire. There, he intended to mobilise a rebel force to reconquer Uganda which was engulfed in another civil war at the time. The rest of his family stayed in Jeddah. Despite using a false Zairean passport, Amin was easily recognised upon arriving via Air Zaïre at N'djili Airport and was promptly arrested by Zairean security forces. The Zairean government reacted unfavourably to Amin's arrival and attempted to expel him from the country. At first, Saudi Arabia refused to allow him to return, as its government was deeply offended that he had "abused their hospitality" by leaving without permission, and doing so for political reasons. The Zairean government wanted neither to extradite Amin to Uganda where the ex-president faced murder charges nor keep him in Zaire, thereby straining international relations. As a result, Amin was initially expelled to Senegal from where he was supposed to be sent to Saudi Arabia, but the Senegalese government sent him back to Zaire when Saudi Arabia continued to refuse Amin a visa. Following appeals by Moroccan King Hassan II, the Saudi Arabian government finally relented and allowed Amin to return. In return, Amin had to promise to never again participate in any political or military activities, nor give interviews. He consequently spent the remainder of his life in Saudi Arabia.

In the final years of his life, Amin reportedly ate a fruitarian diet. His daily consumption of oranges earned him the nickname "Dr Jaffa" among Saudi Arabians.

== Illness and death ==
On 19 July 2003, Amin's fourth wife, Nalongo Madina, reported that he was in a coma and near death at the King Faisal Specialist Hospital and Research Centre in Jeddah, Saudi Arabia, from kidney failure. She pleaded with the Ugandan president, Yoweri Museveni, to allow him to return to Uganda for the remainder of his life. Museveni replied that Amin would have to "answer for his sins the moment he was brought back". Amin's family eventually decided to disconnect life support and Amin consequently died at the hospital in Jeddah on 16 August 2003. He was buried in Al Ruwais Cemetery in Jeddah in a simple grave, without any fanfare.

After Amin's death, David Owen revealed that during his term as the British Foreign Secretary (1977 to 1979), he had proposed having Amin assassinated. He has defended this, arguing: "I'm not ashamed of considering it, because his regime goes down in the scale of Pol Pot as one of the worst of all African regimes".

== Family and associates ==
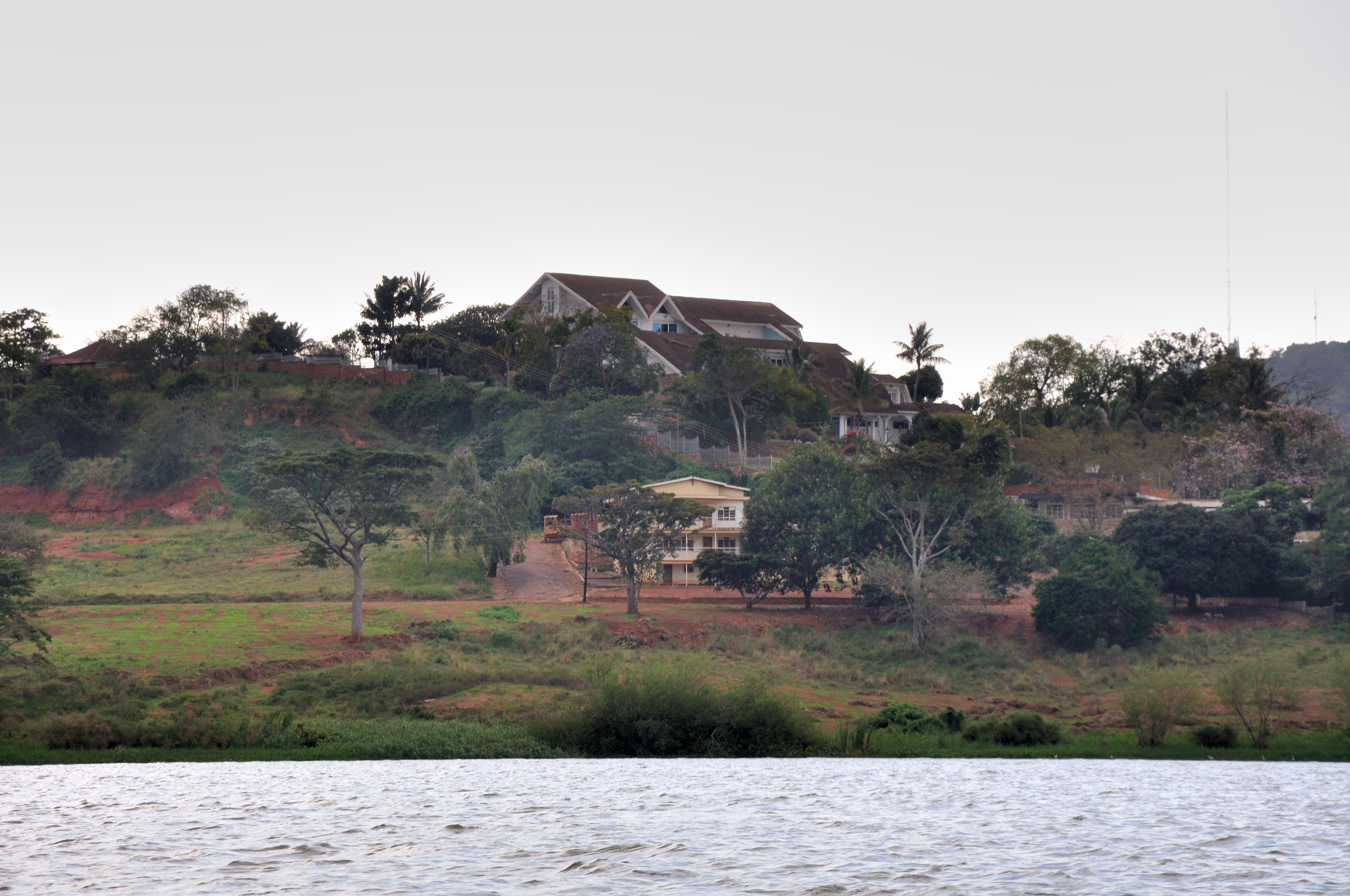
Remnants of Amin's palace near Lake Victoria

Idi Amin married at least six women, three of whom he divorced. He married his first wife, Malyamu, in March 1962 and his second wife, Kay, in May 1966. In 1967, he married Nora, and then married Nalongo Madina in 1972. On 26 March 1974, he announced on Radio Uganda that he had divorced Malyamu, Kay and Nora. Malyamu was arrested in Tororo on the Kenyan border in April 1974 and accused of attempting to smuggle a bolt of fabric into Kenya. In 1974, Kay Amin died under mysterious circumstances, with her body found dismembered. Nora fled to Zaire in 1979; her current whereabouts are unknown.

In July 1975, Amin staged a £2 million wedding to 19-year-old Sarah Kyolaba, a go-go dancer with the Revolutionary Suicide Mechanised Regiment Band, nicknamed "Suicide Sarah". The wedding was held during the Organisation of African Unity summit in Kampala, and the chairman of the Palestine Liberation Organisation, Yasser Arafat, served as Amin's best man. Before she met Amin, Sarah was living with a boyfriend, Jesse Gitta; he vanished and it is not clear if he was beheaded, or detained after fleeing to Kenya. The couple had four children and enjoyed rally race driving Amin's Citroën SM, with Sarah as navigator. Sarah was a hairdresser in Tottenham when she died in 2015.

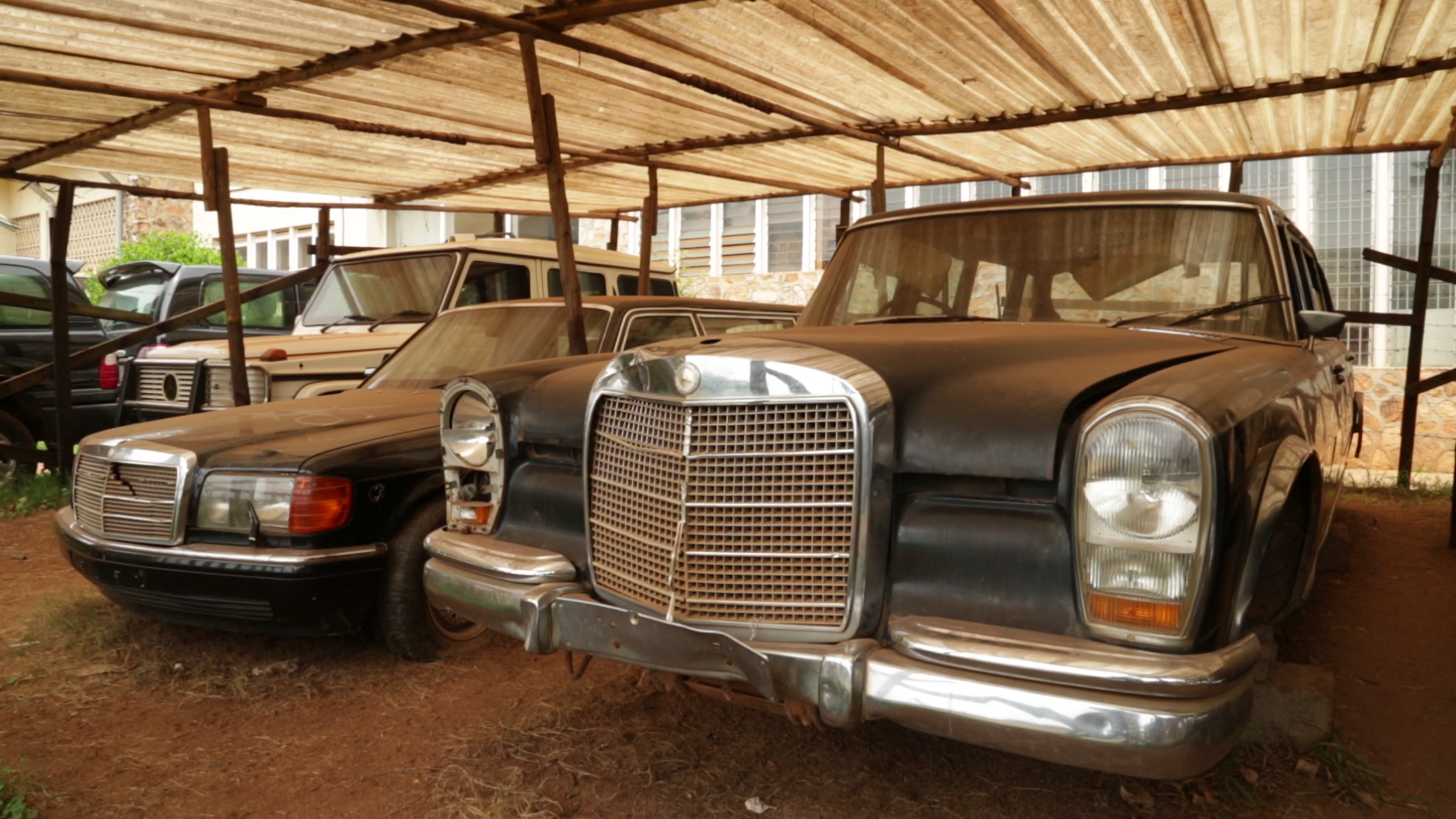
Amin's Mercedes Benz that he owned between 1972 and 1979

By 1993, Amin was living with the last nine of his children and one wife, Mama a Chumaru, the mother of the youngest four of his children. His last known child, daughter Iman, was born in 1992. According to the Daily Monitor, Amin married again a few months before his death in 2003.

Amin fathered as many as 60 children. (Note: A report in the Daily Monitor says he was survived by 45 children, while another in the BBC gives the figure of 54. Some members of his family estimated that he had near 60 children.) Until 2003, Taban Amin (born 1955), Amin's eldest son, was the leader of the West Nile Bank Front, a rebel group opposed to the government of Yoweri Museveni. In 2005, he was offered amnesty by Museveni, and in 2006, he was appointed Deputy Director General of the Internal Security Organisation. Another of Amin's sons, Haji Ali Amin, ran for election as chairman (i.e. mayor) of Njeru Town Council in 2002 but was not elected.

Sarah Kyolaba's third child, Faisal Wangita (born in 1983 in Uganda; according to himself born in 1981 in Saudi Arabia) was involved in a brutal gang murder in Camden, North London, in 2006. In connection with this, he was sentenced to five years' detention in 2007, for conspiracy to wound, conspiracy to possess offensive weapons and violent disorder. He had been convicted for possession of offensive weapons, theft and fraud in the years before.

In early 2007, the award-winning film The Last King of Scotland prompted one of his sons, Jaffar Amin (born in 1967), to speak out in his father's defence. Jaffar Amin said he was writing a book to rehabilitate his father's reputation. Jaffar is the tenth of Amin's 40 official children by seven official wives.

Among Amin's closest associates was the Briton Bob Astles. Isaac Maliyamungu was an instrumental affiliate and one of the more feared officers in Amin's army.

== Character ==
=== Nicknames ===
Over the course of his career, Amin gained numerous nicknames, many of them derogatory:

- "Big Daddy": affectionate nickname
- kijambiya ("the machete"): attributed to Ugandan security forces often murdering their victims with machetes
- "Butcher of Uganda"
- "Butcher of Africa"
- "Butcher of Kampala"
- "Black Hitler"
- "Dada": It is disputed whether this was part of Amin's family name or a nickname. Some observers have claimed that it originated as a nickname for Amin's "cowardly" behaviour, as it can be translated as "sister", though this has been strongly disputed by others. Amin's family has stated that "Dada" was simply an alternative name for the Lugbara people which is occasionally used as a personal name. Researcher Mark Leopold judged this to be more likely than the nickname theory.
- "Dr. Jaffa": he earned this nickname in exile in Saudi Arabia due to his daily consumption of oranges, especially after allegedly transitioning to fruitarianism.

=== Erratic behaviour, self-bestowed titles and media portrayal ===
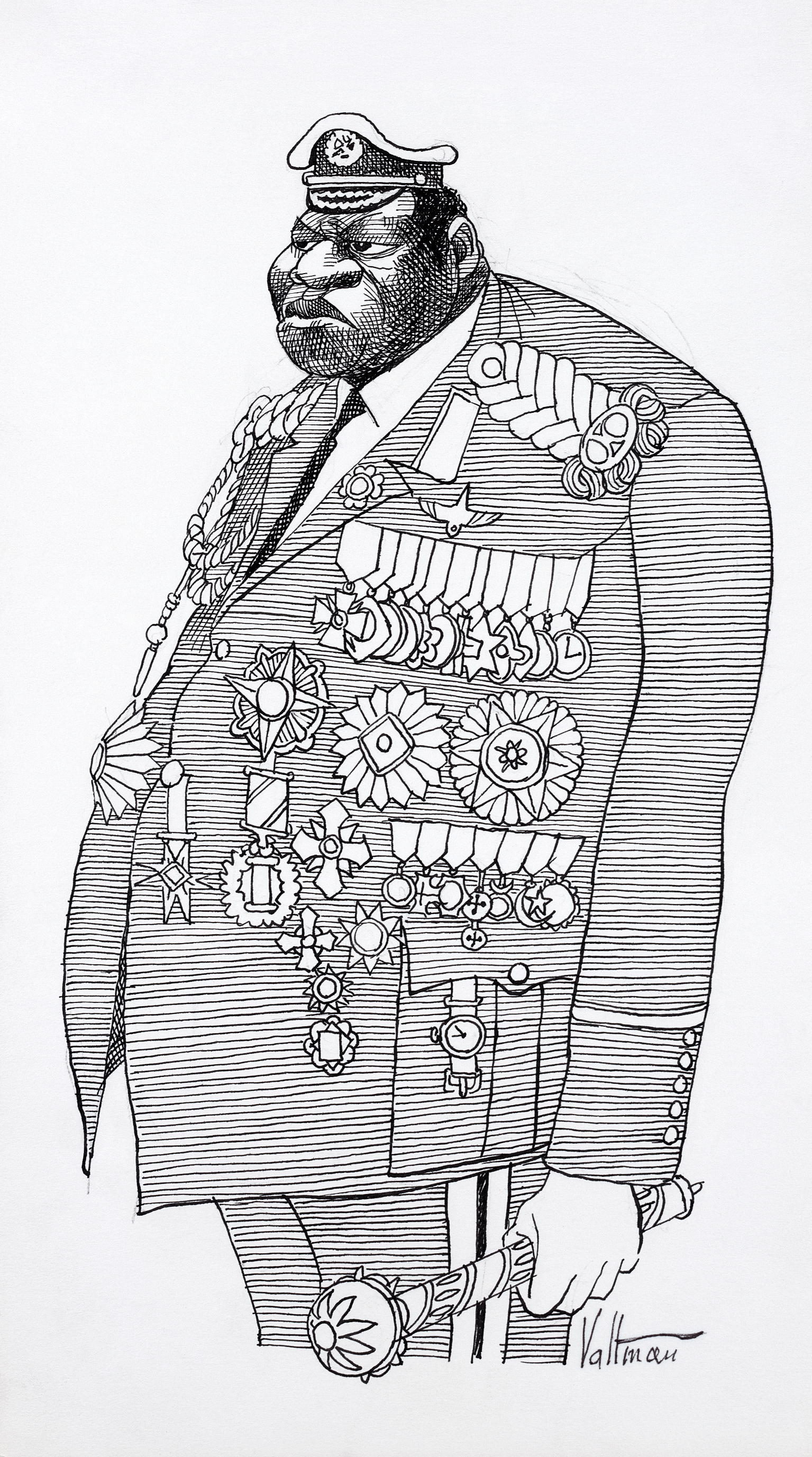
A 1977 caricature of Amin in military and presidential attire by Edmund S. Valtman

As the years progressed, Amin's behaviour became more erratic, unpredictable, and strident. After the United Kingdom broke off all diplomatic relations with his regime in 1977, Amin declared that he had defeated the British, and he conferred on himself the decoration of CBE (Conqueror of the British Empire). His full self-bestowed title ultimately became: "His Excellency, President for Life, Field Marshal Al Hadji Doctor Idi Amin Dada, VC, DSO, MC, CBE, Lord of All the Beasts of the Earth and Fishes of the Seas and Conqueror of the British Empire in Africa in General and Uganda in Particular", in addition to his officially stated claim of being the uncrowned king of Scotland. He never received the Distinguished Service Order (DSO) or the Military Cross (MC). He conferred a doctorate of law on himself from Makerere University as well as the Victorious Cross (VC), a medal made to emulate the British Victoria Cross.

Amin became the subject of rumours, including a widespread belief that he was a cannibal. Amin reportedly also boasted that he kept the severed heads of political enemies in his freezer, although he said that human flesh was generally "too salty" for his taste.

During Amin's time in power, popular media outside of Uganda often portrayed him as an essentially comic and eccentric figure. Julius Harris emphasised Amin's allegedly clownish side in Victory at Entebbe, while Yaphet Kotto drew more praise for projecting Amin's sinister nature in Raid on Entebbe. In a 1977 assessment typical of the time, a Time magazine article described him as a "killer and clown, big-hearted buffoon and strutting martinet". The comedy-variety series Saturday Night Live aired four Amin sketches between 1976 and 1979, including one in which he was an ill-behaved houseguest in exile, and another in which he was a spokesman against venereal disease. In 1979, radio host Don Imus made multiple on-air telephone calls in an attempt to talk to Amin, and later hosted a phony interview with him that was deemed "very dirty". In a Benny Hill Show episode transmitted in January 1977, Hill portrayed Amin sitting behind a desk that featured a placard reading "ME TARZAN, U GANDA".

The foreign media were often criticised by Ugandan exiles and defectors for emphasizing Amin's self-aggrandizing eccentricities and taste for excess while downplaying or excusing his murderous behaviour. Other commentators even suggested that Amin had deliberately cultivated his eccentric reputation in the foreign media as an easily parodied buffoon in order to defuse international concern over his administration of Uganda. Ugandan soldier and rebel Patrick Kimumwe argued that Amin's "clowning conceal[ed] a ruthless extinction of human rights" in Uganda. Journalists Tony Avirgan and Martha Honey wrote, "facile explanations of Amin's regime, as either a one-man show or a lawless and ruthless band of killers, do not get at the heart of the power structure".

== Legacy ==
Gender historian Alicia Decker wrote that the "deeply embedded culture of militarism in Uganda is undoubtedly Amin's most enduring legacy". In the immediate aftermath of his deposition, war correspondent Al J Venter stated that Ugandans still spoke about Amin "with a certain amount of awe, now laced with venom". His reputation in Uganda has been viewed over the decades following his rule in more complex ways than in the international community. Some Ugandans have praised him as a "patriot" and supported his decision to expel Asians from the country. At the time of his death, he was particularly well-regarded in north-western Uganda. One of Amin's sons, Jaffar Remo, criticised the negative public perception of his father and called for a commission to investigate the veracity of the abuses committed under his rule.

The Ugandan academic Mahmood Mamdani, himself a deportee of Idi Amin's expulsion of Ugandan Asians, asserted in 2025 that despite his brutality and extravagance, Amin was chiefly an anti-colonial moderniser who resisted the influence of the British Empire. He contrasted Amin's project to create a Black African country with Yoweri Museveni's appeals to tribalism and fragmentation of Uganda's national identity. Mamdani's conclusions were criticised by Ugandan author Arthur Gakwandi who argued that Mamdani appeared to mainly uplift Amin to denigrate Yoweri Museveni, downplaying contemporary reports regarding Amin's policies and unpopularity despite the arguments of "leading Ugandan historians who have portrayed Amin's rule as a dark chapter in Uganda's history".

== In popular culture ==
During the 1970s, while Amin was at the height of his infamy, British comic actor John Bird starred on the album The Collected Broadcasts of Idi Amin, with lyrics based on Alan Coren's anti-Amin Punch columns. In 1975 the satirical single "Amazin' Man", from the album, was released on the Transatlantic label. The record stayed for 12 weeks in the Australian Singles Chart, peaking at number 26.

A 1974 documentary film General Idi Amin Dada: A Self Portrait by director Barbet Schroeder was made with the support and participation of Idi Amin. Rise and Fall of Idi Amin (1981) is a Kenyan film that details the history of Idi Amin's reign. This film popularised many rumours about Amin's brutality, such as his alleged mutilation of one of his wives. Amin is played by Joseph Olita, who reprised this role in Mississippi Masala (1991), a film about romance between African and Asian-Americans following Amin's 1972 expulsion of Asians from Uganda.

Amin is the subject of English journalist Giles Foden's novel The Last King of Scotland (1998), which focuses on Idi Amin's Uganda through the eyes of a young Scottish physician. The book was adapted into a 2006 feature film, starring Forest Whitaker as Amin. For his performance, Whitaker was named the Best Lead Actor at the Academy Awards, BAFTA Awards, Screen Actors Guild Awards, Golden Globes and Critics Choice Movie Awards.

In 2012, British synth-pop duo Pet Shop Boys released a song called Hell, which mentions a whole host of people who have made a name for themselves in history through acts of violence, including Idi Amin.

== See also ==
- Notable adherents of fruitarianism

== Sources ==
- Avirgan, Tony; Honey, Martha (1983). War in Uganda: The Legacy of Idi Amin. Dar es Salaam: Tanzania Publishing House. ISBN 978-9976-1-0056-3.
- Cooper, Tom; Fontanellaz, Adrien (2015). Wars and insurgencies of Uganda 1971–1994. Solihull: Helion And Company. ISBN 978-1-910294-55-0. OCLC 898052235.
- Cotton, Fran (Ed., 1984). The Book of Rugby Disasters & Bizarre Records. Compiled by Chris Rhys. London. Century Publishing. ISBN 0-7126-0911-3.
- Day, Christopher R. (July 2011). "The Fates of Rebels: Insurgencies in Uganda". Comparative Politics. 43 (4): 439–458. doi:10.5129/001041511796301623. JSTOR 23040638.
- Decalo, Samuel (1989). Psychoses of Power: African Personal Dictatorships. Boulder, Colorado: Westview Press. ISBN 0-8133-7617-3.
- Decker, Alicia C. (2014). In Idi Amin's Shadow: Women, Gender, and Militarism in Uganda. Athens, Ohio: Ohio University Press. ISBN 978-0-8214-4502-0.
- Gwyn, David (1977). Idi Amin: Death-Light of Africa. Boston: Little, Brown and Company. ISBN 0-316-33230-5.
- Hansen, Holger Bernt (1977). Ethnicity and Military Rule in Uganda: a study of ethnicity as a political factor in Uganda, based on a discussion of political anthropology and the application of its results (PDF). Uppsala: Scandinavian Inst. of African Studies. Archived (PDF) from the original on 2 April 2020.
- Hansen, Holger Bernt (2013). "Uganda in the 1970s: a decade of paradoxes and ambiguities". Journal of Eastern African Studies. 7 (1): 83–103. doi:10.1080/17531055.2012.755315. S2CID 144443665.
- Hooper, Edward (1999). The River: A Journey Back to the Source of HIV and AIDS. London: Allen Lane. ISBN 978-0-7139-9335-6.
- Kasozi, A. (1994). Social Origins of Violence in Uganda, 1964-1985. McGill-Queen's Press. ISBN 9780773564879.
- Kyemba, Henry (1977). A State of Blood: The Inside Story of Idi Amin. New York: Ace Books. ISBN 978-0441785346.
- Leopold, Mark (2020). Idi Amin: The Story of Africa's Icon of Evil. New Haven, Connecticut: Yale University Press. ISBN 978-0-300-15439-9.
- Leopold, Mark (2005). Inside West Nile. Violence, History & Representation on an African Frontier. Oxford: James Currey. ISBN 0-85255-941-0.
- Lloyd, Lorna (2007). Diplomacy with a Difference: The Commonwealth Office of High Commissioner, 1880–2006. University of Michigan: Martinus Nijhoff. ISBN 978-90-04-15497-1.
- Mambo, Andrew; Schofield, Julian (2007). "Military Diversion in the 1978 Uganda–Tanzania War". Journal of Political and Military Sociology. 35 (2): 299–321. ISSN 0047-2697.
- Melady, Thomas P.; Margaret B. Melady (1977). Idi Amin Dada: Hitler in Africa. Kansas City: Sheed Andrews and McMeel. ISBN 0-8362-0783-1.
- Nugent, Paul (2012) [1st pub. 2004]. Africa since Independence (2nd ed.). London: Red Globe Press. ISBN 978-0-230-27288-0. Archived from the original on 18 July 2020.
- Orizio, Riccardo (2004). Talk of the Devil: Encounters with Seven Dictators. Walker & Company. ISBN 0-436-20999-3.
- Palmowski, Jan (2003). Dictionary of Contemporary World History: From 1900 to the Present Day (Second ed.). Oxford University Press. ISBN 0-19-860539-0.
- Peterson, Derek R. (2025). A Popular History of Idi Amin's Uganda. New Haven & London: Yale University Press. ISBN 978-0300278385.
- Reid, Richard J. (2017). A History of Modern Uganda. Cambridge: Cambridge University Press. ISBN 978-1-107-06720-2. Archived from the original on 22 October 2020.
- Rice, Andrew (20 August 2003). "The General" (PDF). Institute of Current World Affairs Letters. AR (12). Archived (PDF) from the original on 23 September 2020.
- Roberts, George (2017). "The Uganda–Tanzania War, the fall of Idi Amin, and the failure of African diplomacy, 1978–1979". In Anderson, David M.; Rolandsen, Øystein H. (eds.). Politics and Violence in Eastern Africa: The Struggles of Emerging States. London: Routledge. pp. 154–171. ISBN 978-1-317-53952-0.
- Seftel, Adam, ed. (2010) [1st pub. 1994]. Uganda: The Bloodstained Pearl of Africa and Its Struggle for Peace. From the Pages of Drum. Kampala: Fountain Publishers. ISBN 978-9970-02-036-2.
- Singh, Madanjeet (2012). Culture of the Sepulchre: Idi Amin's Monster Regime. New Delhi: Penguin Books India. ISBN 978-0-670-08573-6. Archived from the original on 18 November 2016.
- Venter, Al J. (October 1979). "The War is over – What next?". Soldier of Fortune. 4 (10). Soldier of Fortune: 58–59, 77, 84–85.

Political offices
Preceded by Milton Obote	President of Uganda; 1971–1979	Succeeded by Yusufu Lule
