= Vurra =

- Location on the DRCongo–Uganda border Placement on map is approximate
- Coordinates: 02°53′11″N 30°52′46″E
- Country: Uganda
- Region: Northern Region
- Sub-region: West Nile
- District: Arua District
- Counties of Arua District: Vurra County
- Elevation: 1,333 m (4,373 ft)

Vurra is a town in Uganda.

== Location ==
The town is in the northwestern corner of Uganda, close to the international border with the Democratic Republic of the Congo (DRC). Vurra is in Arua District of the West Nile sub-region. It is approximately 33 kilometres (21 mi), by road, south-west of Arua, the location of the district headquarters and the largest city in the sub-region. Vurra is approximately 480 kilometres (298 mi), by road, north-west of Kampala, the capital and largest city of Uganda. The coordinates of Vurra are 2°53'11.0"N, 30°52'46.0"E (Latitude:2.886389; Longitude:30.879444).

== Overview ==
Vurra is a small border town, sitting directly on the border with the DRC across from the town of Aru in the DRC. It is the southernmost point along the Vurra-Arua-Koboko-Oraba Road. Vurra is the birthplace of the Ugandan international long-distance champion athlete Dorcus Inzikuru.

== Points of interest ==
- offices of Vurra Town Council
- headquarters of Vurra County
- Vurra central market

== Notable people ==
- Dorcus Inzikuru, athlete
