= Mount Liru =

Mountain in Uganda

Coordinates: 3°20′56″N 31°01′28″E

- Location within Uganda

Highest point
- Elevation: 1,388 m (4,554 ft)

Geography
- Location: Koboko District, Uganda
- Country: Uganda
- Region: West Nile
- Parent range: West Nile sub-region

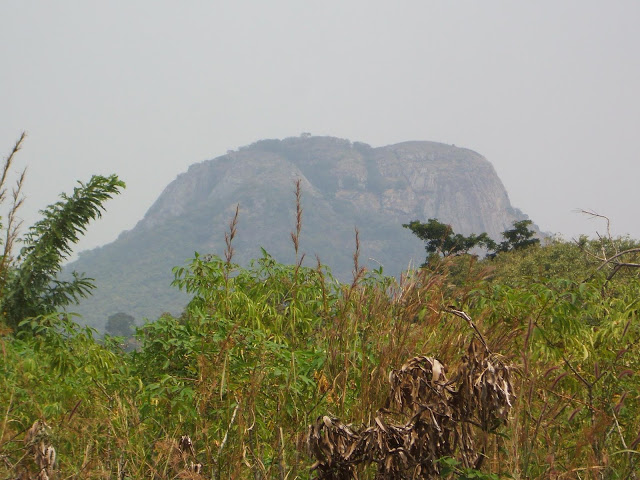
Ancestral hill of the Kakwa

Mount Liru is a Ugandan mountain in Koboko District, formerly part of Arua in north western Uganda( near borders with the democratic republic of the Congo). The mountain is an important location in the origin myth of the Kakwa people.

== Altitude ==
The elevation above sea level is 1,388 metres (1,388m).

== See also ==
- List of National Cultural Sites in Northern Region, Uganda
- List of mountains in Uganda
- Geography of Uganda
- West Nile sub-region
- Koboko District
