= Evelyn Anite =

Ugandan politician (born 1984)

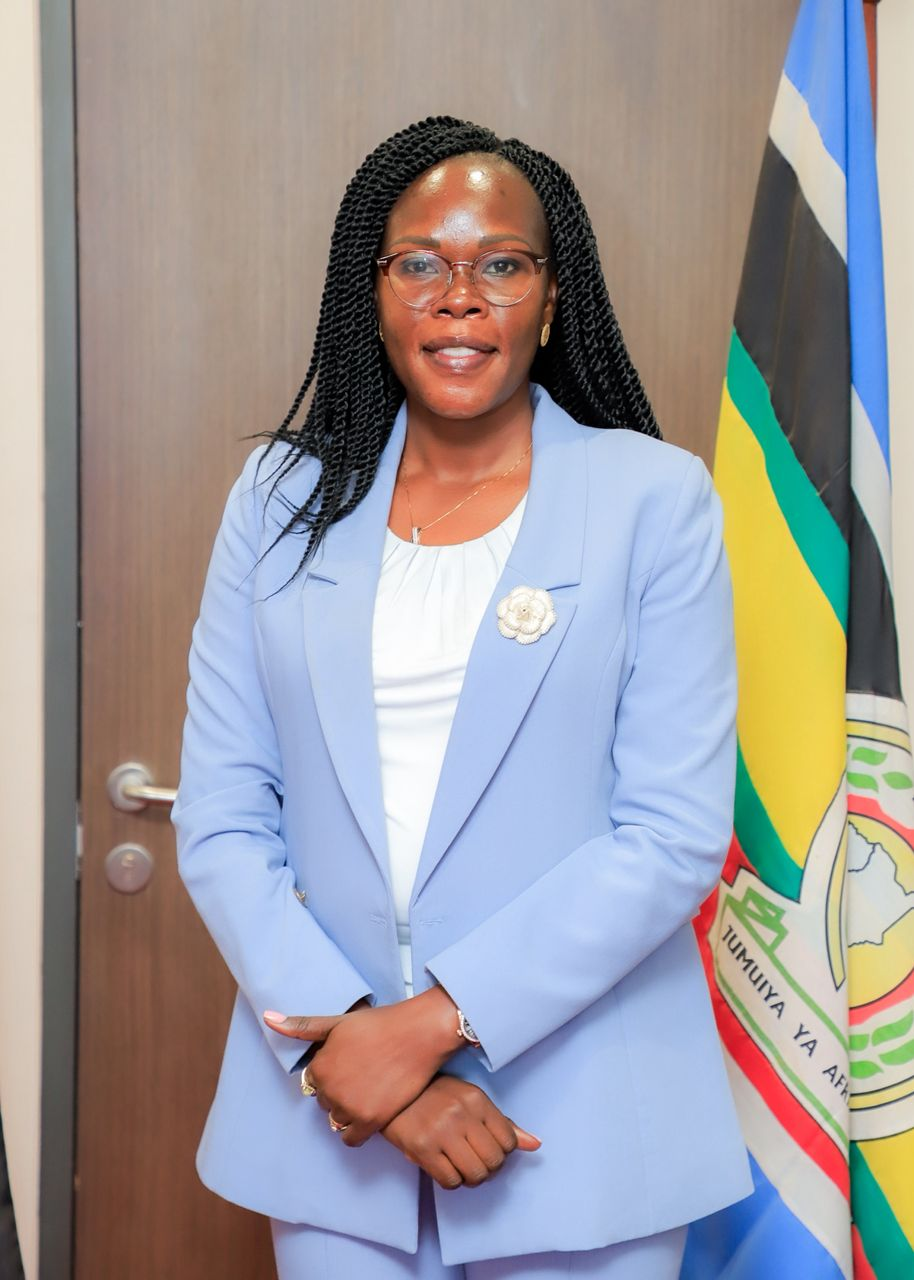
- Anite in 2026
- Born: 11 November 1984 (age 41); Adakado, Koboko District, Uganda
- Citizenship: Uganda
- Education: Uganda Christian University (Bachelor of Arts in Mass Communication); Fletcher School of Law and Diplomacy (Global Master of Arts Programme in International Law and Diplomacy); Harvard Business School (Senior Executive Program Certificate)
- Occupations: Politician, Entrepreneur
- Years active: 2006 – present
- Known for: Politics, Entrepreneur
- Title: State Minister for Investment & Privatization in the Cabinet of Uganda
- Spouse: Married to Allan Kajik since 2011.
- Website: https://www.aniteevelyn.com/

Evelyn Anite Kajik (born 11 November 1984), commonly known as Evelyn Anite, is a Ugandan politician and former journalist. She has served as State Minister of Finance for Investment and Privatization in the Ugandan Cabinet since 6 June 2016.

Anite previously served as State Minister for Youth, a position she held from March 1, 2015, to June 6, 2016. She succeeded Ronald Kibuule, who was then after appointed State Minister for Water Resources.

Anite was also the elected Member of Parliament for Koboko Municipality in the West Nile sub-region of Uganda's Northern Region, serving from 2011 to 2021.

In 2021, Anite didn't participate in the general elections leaving the sest to National Resistance Movement (NRM's) Charles Ayume, son of the late Francis Ayume, a former speaker of the Ugandan Parliament.

== Early life and education ==
Anite was born on 11 November 1984, in Adakado Village, Koboko District, in the West Nile sub-region of Uganda's Northern Region, to Steven Dravu, a civil servant, and Sarah Wokoru Dravu, a businesswoman. She is fluent in both Lugbara and Kakwa languages. She attended Arua Hill Primary School for her elementary school education. She studied at Saint Mary's Ediofe Secondary School for her O-Level studies. She transferred to Muni Girls' Secondary School for her A-Level education. She holds a Bachelor of Arts in Mass Communication from Uganda Christian University in 2008.

In 2018–2019, she earned a Master of Arts in International Law and Diplomacy from Fletcher School of Law and Diplomacy of Tufts University, in Medford, Massachusetts, in the United States. She has also completed a Senior Executive Program Certificate from Harvard Business School.

== Career ==
Anite began her career in media, working as a radio presenter and in news monitoring, scripting, and hosting. From 2008 to 2010, she served as a Public Affairs Assistant for International Relations at the Uganda Media Centre.

. In 2011, she entered politics, winning the parliamentary seat as the Youth Representative for Northern Uganda. She served in that role until 2016, when she successfully contested and won the direct seat for Koboko Municipality, serving until 2021. During her parliamentary tenure, she held positions including Publicity Secretary of the NRM Parliamentary Caucus, Coordinator of Uganda–Qatar relations, board member of the Parliamentary Pension Scheme and Makerere University Business School, and committee member on Equal Opportunities, Foreign Affairs, and Health.

On 1 March 2015, she was appointed State Minister for Youth and Children Affairs. She was reappointed to cabinet on 6 June 2016 as State Minister of Finance for Investment and Privatization, a position she continues to hold as of 2026. In this role, she represents government interests in enterprises under the Privatization Unit and promotes investment in Uganda. .

== Controversies ==
Anite, who represented the Youth of Uganda in the 9th Parliament (2011 to 2016) Koboko Municipality in the 10th Parliament (2016 to 2021), once had a heated debate with the then Woman MP of Koboko District, Margaret Babadiri when the latter accused the former of eyeing her seat. Anite referred to Babadiri as her mother who needs to rest from hectic politics. Anite did not compete with Babadiri for the woman MP seat but went for Koboko municipality and successfully competed with men. In February 2014, during the NRM Parliamentary Caucus, ahead of the 2016 presidential elections, Anite moved a resolution to declare President Yoweri Kaguta Museveni the official party flag bearer. The resolution that came to be known as the Kyankwanzi Resolution, was met with resistance.

In response to her support for the removal of the age limit bill, Anite claimed that she had received multiple death threats. This prompted the government to give her a security detail. She also described fellow legislators who were opposed to the bill as "selfish hooligans".

Speaking in support of the removal of the age limit bill, Anite that the ruling party had "the numbers and the national army on their side". The Uganda People's Defence Force (UPDF) has since distanced itself from this utterance.

In December 2019, the Inspector General of Government (IGG) cleared Anite of any wrongdoing in the Uganda Telecom (UTL) Saga and dropped investigations against her.

During the opening of a factory in Njeru, Uganda in October 2020 vowed to spearhead Uganda's industrialization and not to be distracted by accusations against her. She dismissed allegations she had fled the country.

Following her admission to Tufts University, a section of Ugandans living in the United States started a petition and carried out a demonstration demanding that her admission to the university be cancelled. They alleged that the United States should not provide refuge for corrupt officials under the guise of further studies. Tufts University rejected the request stating that she had done nothing wrong to warrant her expulsion. They further added that as a student at the school of law, her privacy was protected.

In 2021 after Anite lost the National resistance movement flag bearer elections to Dr Charles Ayume, she withdrew the ambulance she had earlier donated to Koboko Health Center IV.

== Personal life ==
Anite is married to Allan Kajik, a Ugandan diplomat serving as ambassador (or chargé d&#39;affaires) to Canada. The couple has 2 children.

== See also ==
- Koboko District
- The Lugbara
- Lugbara Language
- Ugandan Cabinet
