= Al J Venter =

South African journalist and writer (born 1938)

Al J. Venter
- Born: Albertus Johannes Venter; 25 November 1938 (age 87); Kroonstad, South Africa
- Education: City College of London
- Occupations: Writer; journalist; film producer
- Spouse: Madelon Anne McGregor (m. 1977)
- Children: 3 sons and 2 daughters
- Writing career
- Language: English
- Period: 1965–present

Al J. Venter (born Albertus Johannes Venter, 25 November 1938) is a South African war journalist, documentary filmmaker, and author of more than fifty books who also served as an Africa and Middle East correspondent for Jane's International Defence Review. The surname is pronounced "fen-ter".

== Career ==
Venter has reported on a number of wars in Africa, starting with the Nigerian Civil War in 1967 where he spent time covering the conflict with colleague Frederick Forsyth, who was working in Biafra for the BBC at the time. He has published two books on nuclear proliferation, in particular from South Africa to Iran.

In the 1970s, Venter also reported in Uganda while under the reign of Idi Amin. The most notable consequence of this assignment was an hour-long documentary titled Africa's Killing Fields, ultimately broadcast nationwide in the United States by PBS. In 1974, he wrote Africa at War, a book about the conflicts on the continent that had resulted from post-independence.

In-between, Venter cumulatively spent several years reporting on events in the Middle East, fluctuating between Israel and a beleaguered Lebanon torn by factional Islamic/Christian violence. He was with the Israeli invasion force when they entered Beirut in 1982. From there he covered hostilities in Rhodesia, the Sudan, Angola, the South African Border War, the Congo as well as Portuguese Guinea, which resulted in a book on that colonial struggle published by the Munger Africana Library of the California Institute of Technology.

In 1985, Venter made a one-hour documentary that commemorated the Soviet invasion of Afghanistan. He also spent time in Somalia with the US Army helicopter air wing in the early 1990s, three military assignments with the mercenary group Executive Outcomes (Angola and Sierra Leone) and a Joint-STAR mission with the United States Air Force over Kosovo. Venter was active in Sierra Leone with South African mercenary pilot Neall Ellis flying combat in a Russian helicopter gunship. That experience formed the basis of the book on mercenaries published in 2003 and titled War Dog: Fighting Other People's Wars.

Venter served in the South African Navy from 1956 to 1960, achieving the rank of Acting Leading Seaman. He has been twice wounded in combat; once by a Soviet anti-tank mine in Angola, an event that left him partially deaf, and by submachine gun fire. By his own account, by virtue of his reporting he is persona non-grata in Angola, Ethiopia, Iran, Libya, Syria, the former Soviet bloc (including Afghanistan), Tanzania, Zimbabwe.

Venter originally qualified as a Fellow of the Institute of Chartered Shipbrokers at the Baltic Exchange in London.

== Publications ==
Venter has published over 50 books with a number of publishers. He wrote one of the first books on the developing guerrilla wars in Central and Southern Africa. That was The Terror Fighters, published by the British company Purnells in Cape Town in 1969. It dealt with Lisbon's escalating guerrilla war in Angola during the 1960s and 1970s that eventually led to the downfall of the government in the Metropolis. In the 1970s and 1980s, he found a wide readership with articles on Africa in England, the United States, and Europe, including Soldier of Fortune (Boulder, CO), Bulletin for Atomic Scientists, Middle East Policy, and Great Britain's Daily Express and Sunday Express, and the short-lived Eagle magazine (New York, NY).

Venter also wrote Coloured - A Profile of Two Million South Africans (Human & Rosseau, Cape Town 1974) which served as an indictment of Pretoria's racial policies and was penned before it became fashionable to be anti-Apartheid. Unusually progressive for its time, the book highlighted the contribution of Coloured people against apartheid – some of whom went into exile or chose violent resistance. While he opposed the political system, he got on extremely well with the South African military who subsequently developed a much more realistic approach against racial discrimination. The anti-apartheid figure Robert McBride found the book to be one of the most influential toward starting his political activism.

Venter has contributed to Britain's Jane's Information Group publications for over 30 years. He was published, inter alia, by Jane's Defence Weekly, Jane's Intelligence Review, Jane's Terrorism and Security Review, Jane's Islamic Affairs Analyst. Before 9/11, he was reporting in considerable depth on nuclear, chemical and biological warfare developments in both the former Soviet Union and the Middle East. Venter subsequently wrote three books on related nuclear issues.

Venter has written six books on underwater diving. His major work on free-diving (out of cages) with sharks, was published in 2012.

=== Books ===
- The Terror Fighters (Purnell, Cape Town, 1969)
- Coloured - A Profile of Two Million South Africans (Human & Rosseau, Cape Town 1974)
- Iran's Nuclear Option (Casemate Publishers, Philadelphia, 2005 and also published in India)
- War Dog: Fighting Other People's Wars (Casemate Publishers, 2005)
- Allah's Bomb: The Islamic Quest for Nuclear Weapons (Lyons Press, New Haven, 2007)
- How South Africa Built Six Atom Bombs (Ashanti, South Africa 2009)
- Barrel of a Gun (Casemate Publishers, 2010)
- Gunship Ace (Casemate Publishers, 2012)
- Shark Stories, (Protea Boekhuis, 2012)
- Guerrilla Wars in Africa – Lisbon's Campaigns in Angola, Mozambique and Portuguese Guinea (also to be translated into Portuguese) (Helion and Company, 2013))
- Mercenaries: Putting the World to Rights with Hired Guns (Casemate Publishers, 2014)
- Biafra's War, 1967-70 (Helion and Company, 2016)
- The Chopper Boys: Helicopter Warfare in Africa (Helion and Company, 2016)
- Battle for Angola (Helion and Company, 2017)
- Portugal's Bush War in Mozambique (Casemate Publishers, 2022)
- Takka Takka Bom Bom: An Intrepid War Correspondent's 50 Year Odyssey (Casemate Publishers, 2023)
