= Abairo Falls =

Waterfall in Uganda

Abairo Falls is a Ugandan tourist attraction found in Oyufi Cell, Ayivu Division, Arua City. Located on River Asa, which starts at Ragem (about 8 kilometers from the central business district), Abairo is a unique feature within a small rift valley area in Oluko. The waterfalls are visited by more than 20 people per day and this number increases to over 50 during weekends.

Abairo visitors

Also known as Oluko Falls, the site offers swimming activities in a plunge pool created from accumulated water from the river. Its waters weave gently through villages and farmland before narrowing into rocky channels that gather pace. At Abairo, it plunges gracefully into a natural gorge, transforming from a quiet stream into a living spectacle of spray and sound.

== International Development ==

After being managed by the members of the Abairo Clan for more than 4 years under Arua District, officials in Arua City took up the initiative to plan for the extension of piped running water and electricity, plus upgrading the road from Arua City center to the waterfalls. Sam Wadri Nyakua (Mayor of Arua City) said that the City Authority is ready to develop infrastructure at Abairo, but calls on the locals in the area to desist from selling away land in the area and rather rent it to private developers.

John Acile, the current manager of the site, says the main challenge the city needs to address is that of the road and electricity, adding that the locals are ready to partner with government to develop the area into a major tourist site. Four humanitarian and church-related organizations have already purchased and developed over 10 acres of land around Abairo Waterfalls and are said to have discovered this unique volcanic activity area from space during a flight to Arua more than 7 years ago.

On a rock near the cascade is written: Welcome visitors to the beauty of GOD's creation.

== Directions ==
It takes about 15 minutes by vehicle from Arua City to get near Abairo Falls. From Alua Primary School football field on Oluko Road (which starts at Weatherhead Park Lane), one turns right and follow the road for 2 kilometres until one crosses the River Asa bridge. Shortly after, the river turns right towards Ambeko, but one should go straight on the left road until one reaches a slope. Ask people to direct one when lost or hire a bodaboda motorcyclist to take one directly to the site! one will see homes, a camping site, Shine office with roofed car-park and finally Arise Center before John's home on this tour.

== See also ==
- Miriadua Falls
- Murchison Falls
