= Koboko =

Town in Koboko District, Northern Region, Uganda

- Location in Uganda
- Coordinates: 03°24′36″N 30°57′36″E
- Country: Uganda
- Region: Northern Region
- Sub-region: West Nile sub-region
- District: Koboko District
- Elevation: 3,870 ft (1,180 m)

Population (2024 Census)
  - Total: 67,727

Koboko is a town in Northern Region of Uganda. It is the main municipal, administrative, and commercial centre of Koboko District. Koboko is also the hometown of former dictator Idi Amin who ruled Uganda from 1971 to 1979.

== Location ==
Koboko is approximately 55 kilometres (34 mi), by road, north of Arua, the largest city in the West Nile sub-region. This location is approximately 484 kilometres (301 mi), by road, northwest of Kampala, the capital and largest city of Uganda. The coordinates of the town are 3°24'36.0"N, 30°57'36.0"E (Latitude:3.4100; Longitude:30.9600).

== Population ==
The 2002 national census estimated the population of Koboko at 29,730. In 2010, the Uganda Bureau of Statistics (UBOS) estimated the population at 48,200. In 2011, UBOS estimated the mid-year population at 51,300. In 2014, the national census put Koboko's population at 37,825.

== Points of interest ==
The following points of interest lie within the town limits or close to the edges of town:

- Headquarters of the Koboko District administration
- Offices of the Koboko Town Council
- Koboko Central Market
- Tripoint where the borders of Uganda, South Sudan, and the Democratic Republic of the Congo converge
- Vurra–Arua–Koboko–Oraba Road passes through town, in a south/north direction, intersecting with the Koboko–Yumbe–Moyo Road, in the center of Koboko.

== Notable people ==
- Idi Amin 3rd president of Uganda from 1971–1979. He is known as the Butcher of Uganda because of his influence
- James Baba Ugandan politician
- Evelyn Anite Ugandan politician and journalist

== Schools in Koboko ==
- Koboko Parents
- Queens and Kings
- Koboko Town College
- Nyarilo Primary school
- Teremunga Primary School
- Obamchi Parents
- Obamchi Primary School
- St. Charles Luwanga Secondary school
- Nyangilia Secondary School
- Day Star Secondary School

== Climate ==
The climate is tropical in Koboko. The summers here have a good deal of rainfall, while the winters have very little. The climate is classified as Aw according to Köppen and Geiger. The average temperature in Koboko is 23.6 °C | 74.6 °F. In a year, the rainfall is 1403 mm | 55.2 inch.

This region, situated near the equator line, is characterized by difficult-to-define summer seasons. The best time to visit is January, February, March, April, May, June, October, November, December.

== Climate Koboko: Monthly Averages ==
| Month | Jan | Feb | Mar | Apr | May | Jun | Jul | Aug | Sep | Nov | Oct | Dec | Year |
|---|---|---|---|---|---|---|---|---|---|---|---|---|---|
| Record high °C (°F) | 37.0(98.6) | 37.0(98.6) | 38.0(100.4) | 37.0(98.6) | 33.0(91.4) | 31.0(87.8) | 32.0(89.6) | 32.0(89.6) | 33.0(91.4) | 33.0(91.4) | 33.0(91.4) | 35.0(95.0) | 38.0(100.4) |
| Average high °C (°F) | 32.65(90.77) | 33.5(92.3) | 32.04(89.67) | 29.66(85.39) | 28.1(82.58) | 27.21(80.98) | 26.75(80.15) | 26.91(80.44) | 27.49(81.48) | 27.39(81.3) | 27.7(81.86) | 30.25(86.45) | 29.14(84.45) |
| Daily mean °C (°F) | 27.95(82.31) | 28.88(83.98) | 27.72(81.9) | 25.61(78.1) | 24.57(76.23) | 23.78(74.8) | 23.33(73.99) | 23.39(74.1) | 23.95(75.11) | 23.96(75.13) | 24.38(75.88) | 26.23(79.21) | 25.31(77.56) |
| Average low °C (°F) | 20.91(69.64) | 22.43(72.37) | 21.87(71.37) | 20.45(68.81) | 19.75(67.55) | 18.98(66.16) | 18.58(65.44) | 18.57(65.43) | 18.95(66.11) | 19.29(66.72) | 19.49(67.08) | 20.15(68.27) | 19.95(67.91) |
| Record low °C (°F) | 16.0(60.8) | 18.0(64.4) | 17.0(62.6) | 17.0(62.6) | 14.0(57.2) | 14.0(57.2) | 12.0(53.6) | 15.0(59.0) | 16.0(60.8) | 17.0(62.6) | 16.0(60.8) | 16.0(60.8) | 12.0(53.6) |
| Average precipitation mm (inches) | 6.49(0.26) | 38.62(1.52) | 105.33(4.15) | 246.51(9.71) | 318.18(12.53) | 313.07(12.33) | 308.68(12.15) | 374.99(14.76) | 380.9(15.0) | 456.25(17.96) | 221.42(8.72) | 33.94(1.34) | 233.7(9.2) |
| Average precipitation days (≥ 1.0 mm) | 1.64 | 5.18 | 13.91 | 20.55 | 26.45 | 27.09 | 29.0 | 29.73 | 28.91 | 28.64 | 19.45 | 5.18 | 19.64 |
| Average relative humidity (%) | 37.06 | 38.66 | 54.24 | 69.91 | 77.99 | 79.23 | 80.34 | 81.59 | 80.91 | 80.66 | 74.65 | 52.36 | 67.3 |
| Mean monthly sunshine hours | 11.16 | 11.56 | 11.68 | 12.24 | 12.16 | 12.18 | 12.08 | 12.06 | 10.99 | 10.78 | 11.11 | 11.34 | 11.61 |

== See also ==
- Kakwa people
