= Kay Adroa =

Second wife of Idi Amin (d. 1974)

Khezia Adroa Amin (died August 1979), known as Kay Adroa, was the second wife of Idi Amin, the president of Uganda from 1971 to 1974, having married him in 1966. She was from the same region as Amin, West Nile.

== Education ==
She was among the first Lugbara women to study at Makerere University.

== Personal life ==
She was a Christian and the daughter of Reverend Silas Adroa in Arua district. Idi Amin divorced her in 1973 or 1974.

On 13 August 1974 Ugandan police found her body in the boot of a car belonging to Dr Eter Mbaru, who had died the previous day from poisoning. An autopsy found she was three to four months’ pregnant and had died from bleeding after an incomplete abortion. It was claimed, however, that she had been murdered by Idi Amin along with other alleged killings. Her death was possibly connected to the purges after the Arube uprising.
