= Garuga, Uganda =

Garuga
- Location of Garuga, Uganda; Placement on map is approximate
- Coordinates: 00°03′25″N 32°33′49″E
- Country: Uganda
- Region: Central Region
- District: Wakiso District
- Counties of Wakiso District: Busiro County
- Elevation: 1,132 m (3,714 ft)

Garuga is a neighborhood in Wakiso District, Uganda.

== Location ==
The neighborhood is located on a peninsula along the northern shores of Lake Victoria. The name refers to the villages at the tip of that peninsular, including Bulega, Bugabo, Nakifulube and Ntabwe. The Garuga Peninsula is approximately 21.5 kilometres (13 mi), by road, east of Entebbe International Airport, Uganda's largest civilian and military airport. The coordinates of Garuga are 0°03'25.0"N, 32°33'49.0"E (Latitude:0.056944; Longitude:32.563611). The average elevation of the neighborhood is 1,132 metres (3,714 ft), above sea level.

== Overview ==
As of February 2019, Garuga is an upscale neighborhood, with the most prominent development in the area being the Pearl Marina Resort, under development by Centum Investments, a Nairobi-based private equity firm. The development sits on 389 acres (157 ha) of prime lakeside real estate. The lakeside is dotted with other resorts, including Katomi Kingdom Resort, and Country Lake Resort. Other developments in the neighborhood include Garuga Resort Beach, a private beach. There is a motor race track called Uganda Motocross Track Garuga. Also found here is the Uganda Buddhist Centre.

There are individual private homes closer to Kampala–Entebbe Road, but as one moves further into the neighborhood and gets closer to the lake, the resorts and gated communities become more common.

== Other consideration ==
The Uganda government plans to tarmac the 8 kilometres (5 mi), Garuga Road, that stretches from Mpala, along the Kampala–Entebbe Road to Katomi Kingdom Resort and runs through the middle of the Garuga neighborhood.
