= Casemate Publishers =

American publishing company

Casemate Publishers and Book Distributors LLC
- Founded: 2001
- Founder: David Farnsworth
- Headquarters location: Havertown, Pennsylvania
- Distribution: Books International (US), Orca Book Services (UK), Peribo (Australia)
- Key people: Michaela Goff (SVP US Distribution Services), Julie Gardiner (Publisher, Oxbow Books), Ruth Sheppard (Publisher, Casemate Publishers)
- Imprints: Casemate Publishers, Oxbow Books, Windgather Press, Brookline Books
- No. of employees: 40 (Group) (2019)
- Official website: www.casematepublishers.com

Casemate Publishers and Book Distributors LLC is a publishing company based in the Philadelphia suburbs that specializes in producing printed military history books. They have published over 500 titles on military history. Many of their books are memoirs and historical overviews of specific military events. They also distribute books for other publishing companies and market their products to enthusiasts, hobbyists, students, instructors, and researchers of military history, as well as members of the armed forces and military organizations.

== History ==
Casemate Publishers was established in 2001, when Combined Publishing‘s US operations were sold to Perseus Books Group and rolled into its Da Capo imprint. The running of their distribution operation was taken over by Combined Publishing's sales director David Farnsworth, who created new distribution company Casemate Publishers and Book Distributors LLC. Casemate began distributing books in North America for publishers, specializing in military history. The company also began to publish its own military history books and since 2001 has expanded its publishing output to 75 book titles a year.

In July 2007, Casemate supported a management buyout of the Greenhill Books/Chatham Publishing distribution operation and sales team from Lionel Leventhal Ltd and set up a new company, Casemate UK Ltd. As a result, Casemate UK became responsible for the sales, marketing, and distribution of a number of military history and art book publishers.

In December 2011, Casemate UK's parent company, Casemate Publishers Ltd, bought leading archaeology publisher and bookseller Oxbow Books, together with its US operation, The David Brown Book Company, from its founder, David Brown, on his retirement. Oxbow was founded in Oxford in the UK in 1983, and is still based there. Oxbow Books currently publishes 80 books a year. With the acquisition of Oxbow Books, Casemate also acquired Oxbow's North American distribution arm, The David Brown Company, which was founded in 1991. In 2013 The David Brown Book Company was rebranded as Casemate Academic. Casemate Academic provides specialist sales, marketing, and distribution to leading institutions and publishers from around the world in the US market.

In 2015, Casemate acquired International Publishers Marketing from Books International and merged its existing Athena brand into a new division, Casemate IPM. Casemate IPM is Casemate's general trade distribution arm. In 2019 Casemate acquired the distribution business of US-based Dufour Editions, making Casemate IPM the largest distributor of books for Scottish, Irish, and Welsh publishers in the United States. Dufour continues to publish under its own imprint and is distributed by Casemate IPM.
