= Koboko District =

- District
- District location in Uganda
- Coordinates: 03°25′N 30°58′E
- Country: Uganda
- Region: Northern Region of Uganda
- Sub-region: West Nile sub-region
- Established: 1 July 2006
- Capital: Koboko

Area
  - Total: 759.7 km^{2} (293.3 sq mi)
- Elevation: 1,285 m (4,216 ft)

Population (2012 Estimate)
  - Total: 236,900
  - Density: 311.8/km^{2} (808/sq mi)
- Time zone: UTC+3 (EAT)
- Website: www.koboko.go.ug

Koboko District is a district in the Northern Region of Uganda. The town of Koboko is the site of the district headquarters.

== Location ==
Koboko District is bordered by South Sudan to the north, Yumbe District to the east, Maracha District to the south, and the Democratic Republic of the Congo (DRC) to the west. The district headquarters are located approximately 55 kilometres (34 miles), by road, north of Arua, the largest town in the sub-region. This is approximately 480 kilometres (300 mi), by road, north-west of Kampala, the capital and largest city of Uganda.

== Overview ==
Koboko District consists of two counties namely, Koboko North and Koboko South. The Koboko North County consists of the Aringa Speaking Community Inclined to Lugbara and the South Inclined to the Pure Kakwa Speaking.

== Population ==
The 1991 national census estimated the district population at 62,300. The 2002 national census estimated the population at 129,100, of whom 65,400 (50.6 percent) were female and 63,800 (49.4 percent) were male. The annual population growth rate, between 2002 and 2012, was calculated at 6.4 percent. In 2012, the population was approximately 236,900.

== Landmarks ==
The district is the location of a tripoint, where the international borders of the DRC, South Sudan, and Uganda intersect.

== See also ==
- Kakwa people
- Mt. Liru
- West Nile sub-region.

== Languages used in koboko district ==
1. English.
2. Swahili.
3. Arabic,
4. French.
5. Kakwa.
6. Lugbara.
7. Kiswahili.
8. Lingala.
9. Bantu.
10. Luganda.
11. Lou, and many more others.

== Schools in koboko district ==
=== secondary schools ===
Daystar Secondary School
Francis Ayume Memorial Ss
Koboko Modern Secondary School
Koboko Parents Secondary School
Koboko Public Secondary Schools
Koboko Town College
Kochi Secondary School
Leeds Secondary School
Longira Secondary Schools.
Midland Secondary School
Millenium College
Nyai Secondary Schools
Nyangilia Secondary School
Nyarilo Secondary School
Ombaci Self-help Secondary School
Progressive College School
Progressive High School, midia
Royal High Secondary School
St. Charles Lwanga College Koboko

=== primary schools. ===
Abele Primary School
Adrumaga Primary School
Alipi Primary School
Anyakalio Primary School
Anyangaku Primary School
Anyau Islamic Primary School
Apa Primary School
Arinduwe Primary School
Audi Islamic Primary School
Aunga Primary School
Ayipe Cope Centre Primary School
Ayipe Primary School
Bamure Primary School
Bezonga Primary School
Birijaku Primary School
Bright Star Primary School
Busiya Primary School
Capital Hill Primary School
Chakulia Primary School
Dranya Community Primary School
Dricile Primary School
Ebenezer Primary School
Eden Junior Primary School
Eden Primary School
Gbukutu Isl Orphanage Primary School
Ginyako Primary School
Glorius Girls’ Primary School
Golden Brain Primary School
Goya Primary School
Green Valley Primary School
Gurepi Primary School
Happy Angels Primary School
Ifoko Primary School
Indiga Hill Primary School
International Partners For Dev’t
J.bright Primary School
Kagoropa Primary School
Kandio Primary School
Kaya Primary School
Kela Primary School
Kenyibuli Primary School
Kimu Primary School
Kingaba Primary School
Koboko Demonstration Primary School
Koboko Prep. Primary School
Koboko Primary School
Kochu Primary School
Komba Islamic Primary School
Kuduzia Primary School
Kuluba Primary School
Kulumgbi
Kumari Primary School
Kuniro Primary School
Leiko Primary School
Liberty Primary School
Light Star Primary School
Lima Primary School
Lobule Primary School
Lokiri Islamic Primary School
Longira Islamic Primary School
Lunguma Primary School
Lurujo Primary School
Madikini Primary School
Marikulu Primary School
Mbili Primary School
Mena primary School
Metino P.7 School
Midia Primary School
Midrabe Primary School
Modrugoro Primary School
Monodu Primary School
Mother Care Primary School
Mt. Liru Community Primary School
Nile Junior Primary
Noor Islamic Primary School
Nyai Primary School
Nyakaliso Primary School
Nyambiri Primary School
Nyangilia Primary School
Nyarilo Pioneer Primary School
Nyarilo Primary School
Nyori – Cheku Primary School
Ogo Primary School
Ombaci Parents Primary School
Ombaci Self Help Primary School
Oraba Primary School
Padrombu Primary School
Pamodo Primary School
Pearl Primary School
Ponyura Parents Primary School
Queens & Kings Primary School
Queens And Kings Primary School
Ruchuko Primary School
Spring Primary School
St. Catherine – Koboko Primary School
St. Mark Nyarild Primary School
Tendele Primary School
Teremunga Primary School
Tukaliri P.7 School
Ulumgbu Primary School
Usubu Primary School
Uyiga Community Primary School
Shone shine primary

== Radio station in koboko district. ==
Spirit FM Koboko

== Economic activity ==
- Millet
- Construction
- Maize

== Livestock ==
- Cattle
- Goat

== See also ==
- Koboko
- Parliament of Uganda
- Districts of Uganda
