= Isaac Maliyamungu =

Ugandan military officer (died 1984)

- Isaac Maliyamungu inspecting captured Tanzanian vehicles, 1978

General Staff Officer I Grade responsible for training and operations
- In office 1970s–1979
- President: Idi Amin

Personal details
- Died: February 1984 Democratic Republic of Sudan
- Relations: Idi Amin
- Nickname: "Bad omen"

Military service
- Allegiance: Uganda
- Branch/service: Uganda Army (UA)
- Years of service: 1967 – 1979
- Rank: Brigadier
- Commands: VIP Protection Unit; Second Infantry Battalion; Simba Battalion; Eagle Colonel Gaddafi Battalion
- Battles/wars: 1972 invasion of Uganda; Uganda–Tanzania War; Battle of Masaka; Battle of Lukaya; Ugandan Bush War

Isaac Maliyamungu, (Note: His surname has also been spelled Malyamungu, Maiyamungu, and Maliyamunya. "Maliyamungu" can be translated as "God's property".) (died February 1984) also known as Isaac Lugonzo, was a Ugandan military officer who served as one of President Idi Amin's most important officials and supporters during the Ugandan military dictatorship of 1971–79. Born in the Congo, Maliyamungu was one of the members of the 1971 coup that brought Amin to power, and was thereafter responsible for brutally suppressing dissidents throughout the country. Rising through the ranks, Maliyamungu amassed great power and earned a feared reputation. He was responsible for the mass murder of civilians and soldiers suspected of being disloyal to Amin.

As the Ugandan military dictatorship weakened and Amin's support eroded among the country's masses and elite, Maliyamungu was one of his few remaining trusted confidants. After the Uganda–Tanzania War's outbreak in 1978, Maliyamungu held important military commands, but had little success in combat against the Tanzania People's Defence Force. When the Tanzanians and their Ugandan rebel allies overthrew Amin's government in 1979, Maliyamungu fled to Zaire, where he intended to become a businessman. In the following year, he and other Uganda Army (UA) commanders assembled a rebel force with which they invaded northwestern Uganda, starting the Ugandan Bush War. Maliyamungu died of poisoning in Sudan in 1984.

== Biography ==
=== Early life and 1971 coup d'état ===
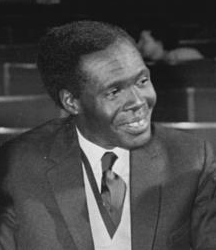
President Milton Obote in 1960

He was born in the western part of the country which later became Zaire and is the present-day Democratic Republic of the Congo. Maliyamungu was a Christian from the Kakwa ethnic group and a cousin or nephew of Idi Amin. At some point, he migrated to Uganda, and got a job as gatekeeper at the Nyanza textile factory in Jinja.

He joined the Uganda Army in 1967, possibly recruited on Amin's orders. By then, Amin had risen to deputy commander of the Uganda Army. In 1970 Maliyamungu was promoted to the rank of corporal and served as pay clerk for the Uganda Army Air Force at Entebbe. At the time, he was aiding Amin in secretly enlisting troops from the West Nile region and southern Sudan. These forces were trained in the Mabira Forest, and were part of Amin's preparations for a coup against President Milton Obote. Maliyamungu eventually learned of Obote's intentions to arrest Amin, and warned his relative, whereupon they accelerated their coup plans. He played a crucial role in Amin's subsequent coup against Obote, and it was later claimed that he had rammed an armoured personnel carrier into an important armoury in the capital Kampala during the coup, ensuring that the putschists had access to necessary weapons. Another putschist, Moses Galla, has disputed this story, and stated that he had been the driver of the APC. Maliyamungu's main task during the coup was to secure Entebbe airport. This he successfully did by driving a tank from the Malire Barracks to Entebbe, and shooting at the airport entrance. He killed two priests by chance, and caused a panic among the airport's guards. The loyalist resistance of Entebbe thus collapsed, allowing Maliyamungu to take control almost unopposed. His takeover of Entebbe impressed Amin, and Maliyamungu consequently won the favor of Uganda's new president.

After the successful coup, Maliyamungu was one of the officers who were entrusted with defeating the remaining militant Obote loyalists and purging the Uganda Army of anti-Amin elements. For this purpose, he was granted "unlimited powers to execute anyone in the army", including superior officers. Alongside Colonel Ali, Colonel Musa, and Major Malera, Maliyamungu succeeded in defeating the armed resistance to the new regime, and proceeded to murder hundreds of political opponents. He later boasted of "single-handedly mastermind[ing]" the mass murder of civilians suspected of being opposed to Amin.

=== Official under Idi Amin ===
==== Rise in the ranks ====
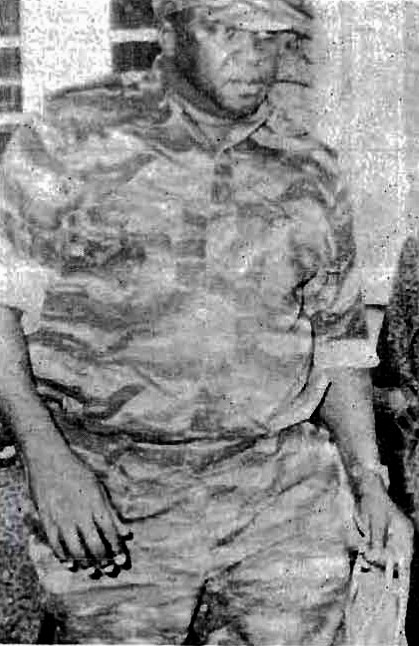
Maliyamungu was one of the closest confidants of President Idi Amin (pictured 1977).

Maliyamungu quickly became Amin's "right-hand man". He was appointed member of the Defence Council, General Staff Officer I Grade responsible for training and operations (de facto army chief of staff), and commander of the Ordnance Depot at Magamaga. In 1972 he served as acting commander of the Second Infantry Battalion based in Masaka. He was appointed the official head of the "Second Simba Mechanized Battalion" at Masaka and promoted from major to lieutenant colonel in May 1973. In 1974, he transferred from head of the Ordnance Depot to commander of the Eagle Colonel Gaddafi Battalion, and was also given command of a mechanised regiment. In April 1975, Maliyamungu left leadership of the Gaddafi Battalion to Hussein Mohammed, and was appointed head of an entire brigade. He consequently oversaw several units from an office in Jinja.

Most importantly of all his commands, Maliyamungu headed the VIP Protection Unit (Amin's bodyguards and enforcers) and played a major role in the State Research Bureau, Uganda's intelligence agency. (Note: According to Somali statesman Hussein Ali Duale, Maliyamungu was the chief of the State Research Bureau, though other sources report that Farouk Minaawa led the intelligence agency during Amin's rule.) Along with Major General Mustafa Adrisi, he was believed to effectively control the entire Ugandan armed forces, and was regarded as the Ugandan President's "power base". Knowing that his power derived from his influence over the soldiers, Maliyamungu reportedly turned down offers of cabinet posts to stay in the barracks. He was generally respected and feared among the common soldiers, and held the power to beat or execute those who disappointed him or were suspected of being disloyal to the Amin regime. By 1977, he claimed to be the de facto heir of Amin due to his loyalty to the regime and reliability in carrying out the President's orders.

In 1976, Maliyamungu was responsible for a major security blunder. Uganda's Ambassador to Lesotho, Isaac Lumago, overheard a conversation by officers of the Kenya Air Force on 4 July. They discussed plans by Israel to carry out a raid against Entebbe to free hostages who were held there by Palestinian and German hijackers with assistance by the Ugandan government. The ambassador informed Maliyamungu, but he regarded the report as "gasiya" (rubbish) and took no action whatsoever. (Note: According to Ugandan commander Bernard Rwehururu, Lumago and Colonel Gad Wilson Toko, who was in Nairobi for non-military reasons, managed to telephone Maliyamungu after failing to reach Army Chief of Staff Mustafa Adrisi. Maliyamungu, who was reportedly drunk at a night club, dismissed the warning and told both men that since they were acting in civilian capacities they both should not involve themselves in military matters.) That same day, Israeli commandos carried out Operation Entebbe, freeing the hostages, and destroying one quarter of the Uganda Army Air Force. While the raid took place, Maliyamungu was allegedly relaxing at a nearby hotel with a prostitute. Following the raid, he had 14 soldiers arrested under suspicion of collaborating with the Israelis. Once they were gathered in a room at Makindye Barracks, Maliyamungu shot 12 of them with his pistol.

Over time, Amin's brutal regime was increasingly destabilized by internal divisions and economic problems despite great repression by state authorities. One of Amin's policies that drew opposition even among his original followers was the great power he gave to Kakwa and Nubians, while leaving officials of other ethnicies underrepresented. As result, a group of officers led by Brigadier Charles Arube attempted to overthrow Amin and kill his Nubian/Kakwa followers, including Maliyamungu. In the end, the so-called Arube uprising failed. Maliyamungu was also regarded as "prime target" for assassination by Ugandan exiles, as he controlled much of the Uganda Army's tank forces. By 1978, Maliyamungu was one of the few remaining people who were regarded as trusted and loyal followers of Amin. He was one of the officers who were responsible for enlisting 10,000 new soldiers for the Uganda Army in Sudan, Kibera (Kenya), and Uganda around September 1978. This mass recruitment followed extensive purges in the military.

==== Involvement in state repression ====
Maliyamungu was known as Idi Amin's "hit man" and "principal hangman". The forces under his command used extreme methods in suppressing suspected dissidents. Though there is no record of Maliyamungu behaving violently before the coup, after Amin's takeover he became one the new regime's most vicious officials. He was reportedly feared by his colleagues on the Defence Council due to his brutality, and by the rest of the army due to his great powers and close connection with President Amin. Maliyamungu preferred to execute his victims by dismembering or disemboweling them and driving military trucks or tanks over them. His reputation was such that people would panic whenever he came to visit an area.

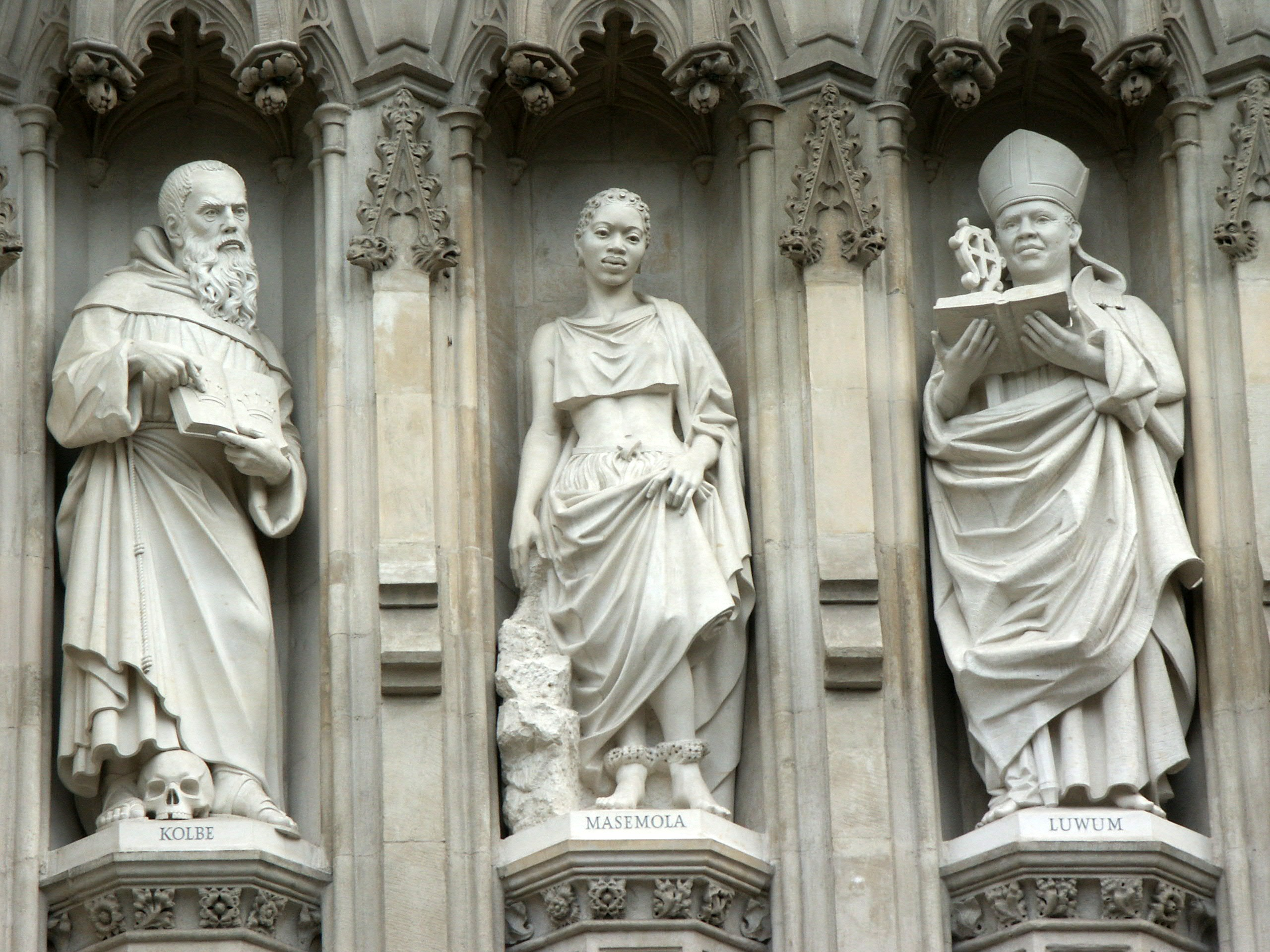
Maliyamungu was probably responsible for the murder of Janani Luwum (right statue, Westminster Abbey).

Maliyamungu was linked to the deaths of several prominent Ugandans during the rule of Amin. In 1972, rebels invaded Uganda. Maliyamungu was entrusted with hunting down and killing rebel stragglers and supporters in Masaka. In course of these purges, he was reportedly responsible for the execution of Francis Walugembe, the popular former Mayor of Masaka. Maliyamungu had previously come into conflict with Walugembe while the latter was mayor as the former tried to exert significant control over Masaka. Maliyamungu first cut off Walugembe's genitals, then paraded him through Masaka's streets, and finally "cut [him] into pieces in the [town's] market in full public view". (Note: Other purported eyewitnesses have implicated Ali Nyege and Abdul Abdallah Nasur, not Maliyamungu, of being responsible for Walugembe's death. Nasur was convicted by a Ugandan court for the murder in 1981.) He also chaired the show trial of Janani Luwum, Archbishop of the Church of Uganda, and other religious leaders in 1977. Luwum as well as his colleagues were murdered shortly after the trial. According to Mustafa Adrisi (Vice President of Uganda at the time) and a Human rights commission, Maliyamungu was directly responsible for their deaths. Intelligence reports also implicate him in the killing of Kung'u Karumba, a friend of Prime Minister of Kenya Jomo Kenyatta and a prominent Kenyan nationalist. Maliyamungu's wife was reportedly indebted to Karumba, and the latter was murdered during a disagreement over the debts in June 1974.

According to George Ivan Smith, President Amin, Vice President Adrisi, and Maliyamungu decided to order a purge of the Langi and Acholi ethnic groups in northern Uganda in 1977. Thousands belonging to these ethnic groups, primarily men, were subsequently murdered. Despite the widespread and brutal suppression of all dissidents, the power of the Amin regime increasingly deteriorated in the late 1970s, as political and economic instability grew in Uganda. In response to these developments, Maliyamungu (by then promoted to brigadier) declared in a 1978 speech to 10,000 civilians that he would use tanks and bulldozers to destroy any area that was opposed to the government, proving to everyone that the regime "is hotter than a heated iron bar and not afraid to act".

==== Corruption ====
Like many other high-ranking officials under Amin, Maliyamungu used his power to enrich himself. When Amin ordered the expulsion of Asians from Uganda, Maliyamungu was placed on a committee to oversee the distribution of their wealth, taking much for himself. He was also involved in coffee smuggling, shipping large amounts of coffee with boats from Uganda across Lake Victoria to Kenya. President Amin ordered his British advisor Bob Astles to clamp down on Maliyamungu's smuggling operations in 1978. According to Indian diplomat Madanjeet Singh, Maliyamungu responded by kidnapping and torturing Astles before releasing him. (Note: Singh stated that Astles' fingernails were pulled out and his face was branded with the Kakwa tribal mark of three parallel scars during the torture. He also claimed that the whole incident was part of a plot by Amin to get rid of Astles by provoking Maliyamungu. In contrast, the Drum magazine argued that Astles' scarification was probably a voluntary sign of honor and was supposed to showcase the latter's loyalty to Amin.)

Maliyamungu also used his national position to intervene in sporting. In late 1975 he interrupted a session of the Uganda Amateur Athletics Association (UAAA) general assembly and declared his desire to lead the organisation. The assembly then unanimously elected him UAAA chairman. During this time he repeatedly intervened in the affairs of Uganda's national sport teams to oversee their preparations for the 1976 Summer Olympics. This came to naught as Uganda boycotted the event.

=== The Uganda–Tanzania War, exile and death ===
Map of the Uganda–Tanzania War, including the Ugandan invasion of Kagera, the Battle of Masaka, and the Battle of Lukaya

When the Uganda–Tanzania War broke out under unclear circumstances in October 1978, the Uganda Army soon began to encounter serious difficulties. The Ugandan Invasion of Kagera was repelled by November 1978, as the Tanzania People's Defence Force (TPDF) launched a large-scale counter-offensive. After retaking Kagera, the Tanzanians advanced into Uganda. At the time, Radio Tanzania falsely claimed that Amin had dismissed Maliyamungu and put him under house arrest.

By February 1979, Maliyamungu was in command of the garrison at Masaka, which was one of the most important towns in southern Uganda, and thus became a target of the advancing Tanzanian troops. Though thousands strong, the Ugandan forces at Masaka were wrought by indiscipline and internal divisions. With the exception of a number of probes against Tanzanian positions around the town, which Maliyamungu ordered on 23 February, the defense of Masaka was ineffective. The TPDF managed to occupy it almost without resistance on 24 February, while the Ugandans fled north. Maliyamungu got lost in the bush for more than a week following the battle at Masaka; according to journalist Felix Ocen, he feared reprisals for his defeat, and eventually returned with an apology.

With Masaka under Tanzanian control, Kampala was threatened, prompting President Amin to order a counter-offensive. It was planned that the Ugandans and allied Libyan forces would first retake Lukaya, and then attack Masaka with the ultimate aim of expelling the TPDF from Uganda. Maliyamungu was one of the commanders entrusted with leading this operation, and prepared the troops under his command well, according to Tanzanian Lieutenant Colonel Ben Msuya. The Ugandan offensive began on 10 March 1979, starting the Battle of Lukaya. Widely differing assessments of Maliyamungu's conduct during this battle exist. Whereas Msuya praised him for smartly executing the initial Ugandan attack which resulted in the rout of the Tanzanian 201st Brigade and capture of Lukaya, Idi Amin's son Jaffar Rembo Amin later claimed that Maliyamungu had been bribed by the Tanzanians to lose the battle, and also accused him of cowardice for placing his command position miles from the frontlines. The battle turned against the Ugandans on 11 March, as the TPDF launched a successful counter-attack. In an attempt to strengthen morale, Maliyamungu and Major General Yusuf Gowon joined their troops on the frontline at Lukaya. For unknown reasons, the positions the two men took were frequently subject to sudden, intense rocket fire. Ugandan junior officers tried to convince their men that the Tanzanians were probably aware of the generals' presence and were targeting them with precise bombardments. The Ugandan troops nonetheless felt that Maliyamungu and Gowon were harbingers of misfortune and nicknamed them bisirani, or "bad omen". The leading Ugandan commander at Lukaya, Godwin Sule, realised the generals were not having a positive effect and asked them to leave the front.

When Amin's regime finally collapsed and Kampala fell to the Tanzanians, Maliyamungu fled with his family across the border to Zaire. He took a substantial amount of his wealth with him, and intended to become a businessman. Maliyamungu subsequently became involved in the pro-Amin rebellion in the West Nile sub-region during the Ugandan Bush War. Having gathered a band of fighters, he invaded the West Nile region from Zaire in coordination with other Amin loyalists. He later moved to Sudan where he died of poisoning in February 1984. (Note: Another source has stated that he died in Zaire in the 1980s.)

== Personal life ==
Maliyamungu was multilingual, and could speak Kakwa, Kiswahili, English, Lusoga, Luganda, Runyoro, Luo, as well as other languages. Although little is known about his education, he was regarded as intelligent. The Drum magazine described Maliyamungu as ruthless, courageous, and highly ambitious. In regard to his brutal suppression of dissidents, historian Richard J. Reid described Maliyamungu as "possibly psychotic", while researcher Samuel Decalo called him "a notoriously sadistic killer". Even Amin once reportedly remarked that Maliyamungu was possibly insane.

Maliyamungu was married, and had a son named Samson.

== Legacy ==
Maliyamungu was one of the most well known and infamous members of the Amin regime. His violent behaviour has remained a critical part of memory of him in Uganda As result of his reputation, Maliyamungu's name was even used as nickname for another infamous soldier, Musa Jammeh, a member of the Gambia's presidential guard under Yahya Jammeh. Both informal narratives and academic works often use him as an example of the foreign "mercenaries" employed by Amin's regime and often imply that his violent behaviour could be explained by either his non-Ugandan origin or his allegedly "psychotic" mental state.

Maliyamungu was portrayed by Ka Vundla in the 1981 biographical film Rise and Fall of Idi Amin. Maliyamungu did not appear in The Last King of Scotland, another historical drama centered on Amin; the non-appearance of Maliyamungu and other close allies of the Ugandan ruler was one of several points of criticism by Ugandan critics of the film.
