= Foreign support of Uganda in the Uganda–Tanzania War =

Aspect of Idi Amin's dictatorship

Foreign support played an important role for Uganda during the Uganda–Tanzania War of 1978–1979. Before this conflict, the Second Republic of Uganda under President Idi Amin had generally strained international relations. Accordingly, only a few states as well as non-state allies provided Uganda with substantial military support during the war, most importantly Libya under Muammar Gaddafi and the Palestine Liberation Organization. The intervention of these two parties was regarded as crucial for Amin's ability to stay in power during the later stages of the war, even though they did not prevent Uganda's eventual defeat. However, there were many claims about other states and groups in Africa, the Arab world, Europe, and Asia covertly supplying Amin with materiel, soldiers, and money, although most of these remain unverifiable.

== Background ==
In course of his rule from 1971 to 1979, Amin's international alignments and alliances repeatedly shifted. He proved to be opportunistic, discarding allies when they were no longer useful. This helped him to stay in power and prevented outside powers from exerting too much influence on Uganda. On the other side, Amin earned a reputation as unpredictable, aggressive, and unreliable strongman. In the years before the Uganda–Tanzania War, he had forged particularly close connections with Libya under Muammar Gaddafi, the Palestine Liberation Organisation (PLO), and the Eastern Bloc. However, his relations with the Soviet Union and its allies worsened in 1978, resulting in a reduction in foreign aid before the Uganda–Tanzania War's outbreak. In addition, Uganda was placed under economic sanctions by the United States in response to the poor human rights record of Amin's government. This greatly weakened his position and further damaged Uganda's already-struggling economy.

== Confirmed support by states ==
=== Libya ===
==== Background and early involvement ====
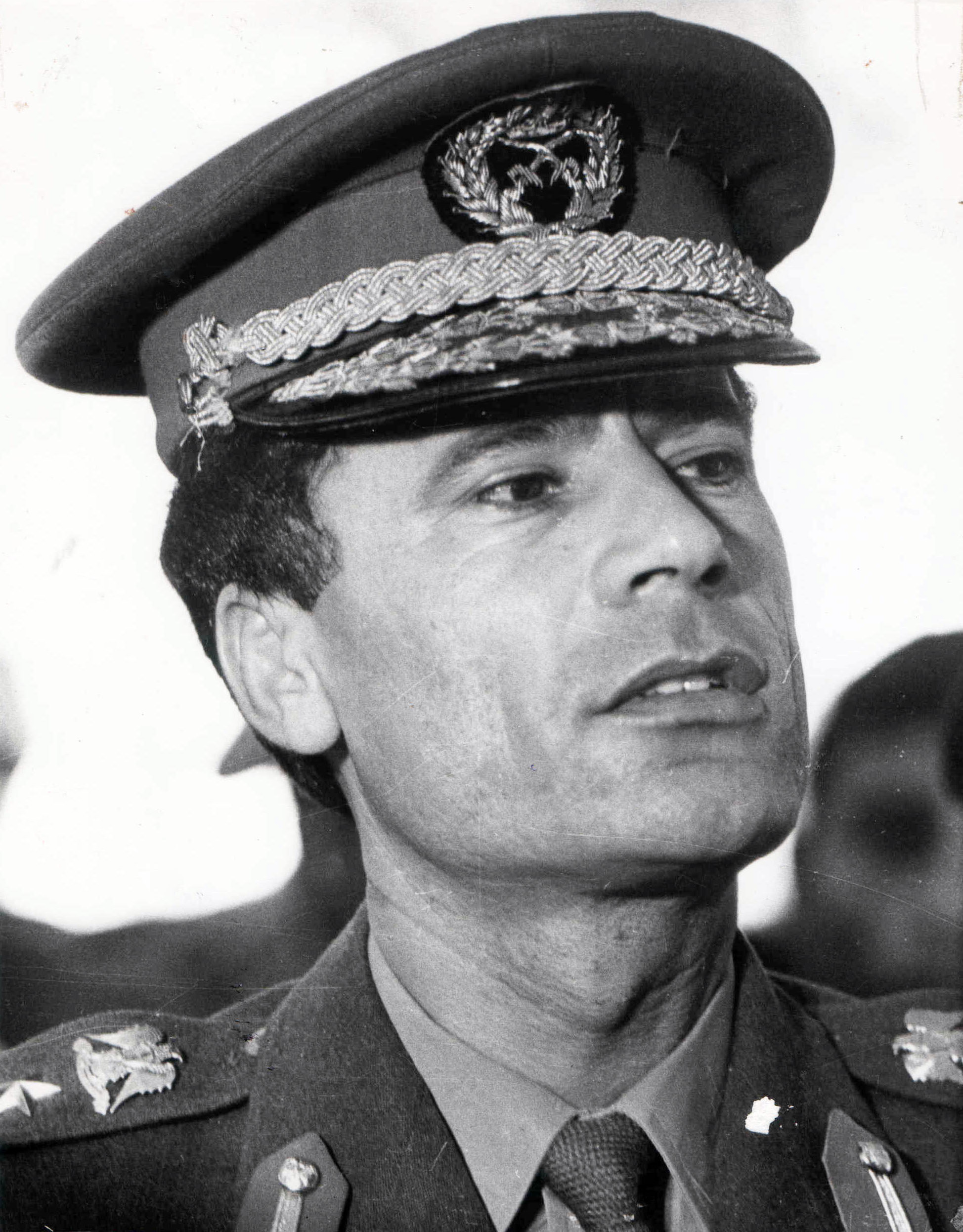
Libyan leader Muammar Gaddafi (pictured) supplied Uganda with troops and materiel during the war.

Libya was Uganda's closest ally at the time of Uganda–Tanzania War. The former had invested financially and politically into Uganda, with Libyan businesses having partially taken over the position of Ugandan Asians who were expelled in 1972. In addition, Gaddafi regarded Uganda as an important base for the Libyan-allied PLO, and as an ally in his rivalry with Egypt and Sudan. Libya "normally" had about 300 to 400 soldiers stationed in Uganda before the 1978–79 war. In 1977, Gaddafi had publicly declared that "whoever declares war on President Amin declares it on Libya".

Shortly before the Ugandan invasion of Kagera, Amin asked Gaddafi to intervene and resolve the "potentially explosive" tensions between Uganda and Tanzania, claiming that Tanzanian forces were moving within 4.8 km (3 mi) of Ugandan border towns. He also requested military support, and Gaddafi reportedly promised Amin to send soldiers. After the Uganda–Tanzania War's outbreak, Libya supported a solution through negotiations. Libya offered to mediate between the two countries in November 1978, and the Ugandan government responded positively to the proposal, but Tanzanian officials dismissed a mediation by Libya. The Observer reported that Libyan troops and arms were being sent to aid Amin as early as 12 November 1978. Journalist Faustin Mugabe stated that Libyan soldiers were being covertly sent to Uganda by December. After the Tanzanians retook the Kagera Salient during Operation Chakaza, they claimed to have captured some Libyan radio technicians serving alongside the Uganda Army. (Note: Journalists Tony Avirgan and Martha Honey noted that the Tanzanians also initially believed to have killed Libyan soldiers during clashes at the Tanzanian-Ugandan border, before identifying the dead as Palestine Liberation Organisation members. Ugandan officer Bernard Rwehururu claimed that "Libyan desert commandos" suffered heavy losses during a clash with the TPDF at Kalisizo in February. Avirgan and Honey stated that the TPDF captured Kalisizo after an artillery bombardment killed about 200 Ugandan soldiers, causing the rest to flee. They did not mention the involvement of any Libyans at the town.)

==== Libyan intervention force ====
Another Libyan mediation attempt in February 1979 failed to bring about any resolution. As a peaceful solution proved unfeasible, Libya began to fully support Amin's government with troops and equipment. According to political scientist René Lemarchand, after the failure of mediation attempts Gaddafi "seems to have found himself obliged to make good on his earlier boasts". Gaddafi felt that Uganda—a Muslim state in his view—was being threatened by a Christian army, and wished to halt the Tanzanians. He reportedly decided to initiate a military intervention without consulting other Libyan officials and over the objections of his army commander, Major Farak Suleiman. In mid-February, Libyan troops were flown into Entebbe to assist the Uganda Army, though in early March the Libyan government denied that its forces were being sent to Uganda.

Over the course of the war a total of 4,500 Libyan troops were deployed in the country. The intervention force included regular units of the Libyan Armed Forces, sections of the People's Militia, and members of the Pan-African Legion. Most of these troops were relatively untrained; few were professionals. Major Suleiman complained that the regular army units were needed at home to guard the border to Egypt; accordingly, the intervention force had to do with second-rate forces. The members of the People's Militia were not even informed that they were being sent into combat. Some of the militiamen were told that they were flown to Tobruk for a celebration parade. Others were made to believe that they would only participate in joint-training exercises with Ugandan troops or were supposed to take part in military exercises in southern Libya. There were also rumours about Libyans being threatened into participating in the intervention force. Most of the militiamen were relatively old. The Pan-African Legion was mostly recruited from Sub-Saharan Africans, mercenaries, and Libyan penal soldiers. The latter were usually criminals who were promised their freedom in return for military service. Regular Libyan soldiers called these fighters the "suicide squads" as they were often selected for dangerous commando operations. According to journalist Edward Cody, the Pan-African Legion contingent in Uganda included a large number of these "suicide squads". An "informed official" commented that "they generally lived up to their name" during the war. American intelligence analyst Kenneth M. Pollack argued that the Pan-African Legion soldiers deployed to Uganda were only half-trained and of comparable combat value as the militia.

Libyan ground equipment in Uganda
Type	Amount	Source(s)
T-55 main battle tanks	15	
T-54 main battle tanks	?	
BTR armoured personnel carriers	12	
Land Rovers with 106 mm (4.2 in) recoilless rifles	dozens	
BM-21 Grad 12-barrel Katyusha rocket launcher variants	12	
122 mm (4.8 in) mortars	?	
D-30 howitzers	2 batteries	

The Libyan force was well equipped with tanks as well as artillery, possessing far more firepower than the Tanzanians. According to Ugandan officer Bernard Rwehururu, however, the Libyan soldiers lacked heavier small arms, being mostly equipped with machine pistols. In addition to the ground forces, Libya also dispatched large quantities of military equipment for the Uganda Army. Much of the supplies and military hardware were stockpiled in Entebbe without ever being used in combat because Ugandan forces did not have the logistical capability to efficiently distribute them. Over the course of the war, Libyan personnel and materiel were mostly brought into Entebbe's international airport in a regular airlift. Some were also transported to Gulu in Uganda's north. There were reports about one Libyan transport aircraft getting lost and crashing in Zaire; the survivors were treated in a hospital in Kinshasa.

Besides ground troops and equipment, Libya also dispatched elements of its air force. However, it is disputed how many and which types of Libyan aircraft were sent to Uganda. The presence of at least two Tupolev Tu-22 bombers was confirmed. There were also claims about Libyan Dassault Mirages and MiG-21s in Uganda, but these were never verified. Researchers Tom Cooper and Adrien Fontanellaz have argued that Libyan short-range combat aircraft were probably not sent to Uganda due to the distance they would have had to cover without refueling. The Libyan Tu-22s were based in Nakasongola Air Base, Entebbe, and Gulu.

The Libyans found the Uganda Army soldiers badly disciplined and unmotivated; they were often left alone to fight the Tanzanians. War correspondent Al J Venter claimed that the Libyans had to repeatedly "haul [the Ugandan soldiers] out of their barracks" and summarily execute several to motivate the rest to fight. Communication between the allies was hampered by language barriers. The Libyans generally did not speak English or Swahili, the common tongues of Uganda. The Ugandan and Libyan troops were often forced to communicate by hand gestures. Many Ugandan soldiers regarded the Libyans' arrival as a chance to desert and flee the country with as much loot as possible.

==== Course of the intervention ====
On 9 March over 1,000 Libyan troops were flown into Uganda. Amin ordered the Libyans, together with some Ugandan troops and PLO guerrillas, to recapture Masaka. This offensive culminated in the Battle of Lukaya which ended in defeat for the pro-Amin forces. About 200 Libyans killed at Lukaya, and many others broke and fled towards Kampala. Following the battle, new military equipment and 2,000 more militiamen were dispatched. These troops included many of those who had been lied to about their destination. According to Mustafa Abuzeid, a Libyan veteran of the war, the militiamen initially assumed to be in a Libyan agricultural project upon arriving in Uganda and seeing the lush green landscape. According to journalist Norman Kirkham, the militiamen became upset upon being informed that they were in Uganda and about to be sent into combat. There were even reports about gunfights and desertions.

The Battle of Lukaya also resulted in the Uganda Army's disintegration; Amin was consequently kept in power mostly due to the continued Libyan support. In an attempt to stem the Tanzanian advance, Gaddafi sent an ultimatum to Nyerere, demanding that he withdraw his forces in 24 hours or face the opposition of Libyan troops. Knowing that Libyan troops were already present in Uganda and had fought at Lukaya, Nyerere was surprised about the ultimatum. Regardless, he officially rejected the threat in a radio broadcast announcing that Libya's entry into the war did not change the Tanzanian government's view of Amin. Following Gaddafi admitting that his forces were involved, the Libyan ambassador to the United Nations officially justified the intervention by stating that the legitimate Ugandan government had requested Libyan aid. By late March, the Libyan press started to openly discuss the intervention, portraying it as a form of jihad against the Tanzanians.

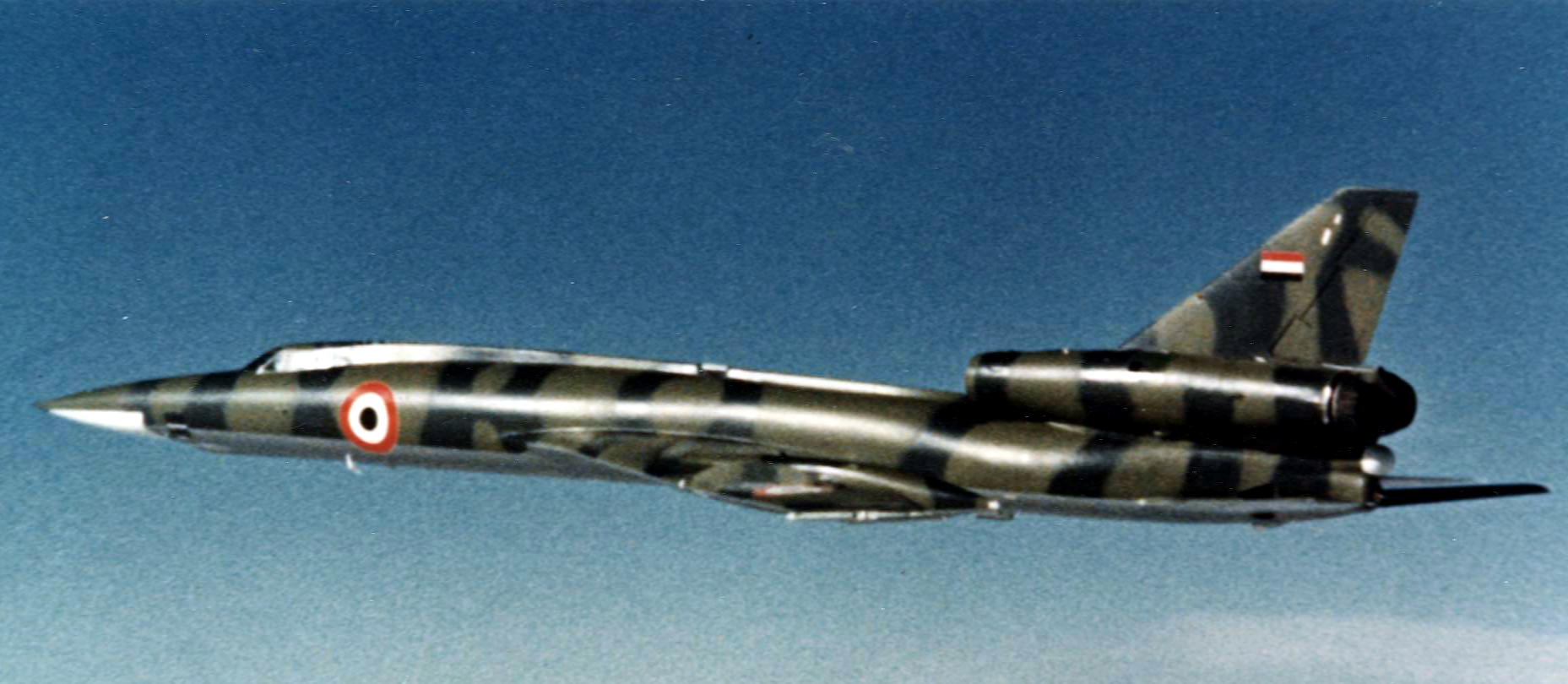
Libyan Tupolev Tu-22 bomber in 1977

The remaining Libyan forces helped to slow down the TPDF advance toward Kampala. The Libyan Tu-22s flew a number of bombing missions, but proved ineffectual. In the course of Operation Dada Idi, several contingents of Libyan troops were destroyed in clashes with the TPDF south of Kampala. On 7 April, the TPDF attacked Entebbe which had been left to be defended by the Libyans after most of the Ugandan garrison had fled. Demotivated, the Libyans offered disorganized resistance, and were easily overwhelmed by the TPDF. Over 300 Libyans were killed, over 40 were captured, and several dozen were wounded. Large stockpiles of Libyan weapons were seized. Many Libyans attempted to evacuate to Kampala but were intercepted and killed. Following the losses at Entebbe, morale among the Libyans was very low. Libyan troops reportedly got increasingly indisciplined, and one group guarding a Kampala power substation reportedly got killed in a shootout with Uganda Army soldiers. Hoping to avoid further Afro–Arab tensions, Nyerere decided to allow the Libyan forces to flee Kampala and quietly exit the war without further humiliation. As the TPDF began to encircle Kampala, it consequently left the eastern road from the city leading to Jinja open. Nyerere sent a message to Gaddafi explaining his decision, saying that the Libyan troops could be airlifted out of Uganda unopposed from the airstrip in Jinja. (Note: According to the German newspaper Der Spiegel, the Libyan government bribed the Tanzanians with $20 million to keep the corridor open.) Lemarchand later argued that Libyan losses would have been much higher without the Jinja corridor.

When the TPDF advanced into Kampala, Libyan units put up little resistance. Some Libyans were killed during the battle, while others hid in the city. The remaining Libyan forces managed to escape in advance or during the battle. Many fleeing Libyans were targeted by Ugandan civilians who misled them, betrayed them to the TPDF or outright murdered them. At least 300 were killed as they attempted to flee the country. The survivors mostly withdrew to Kenya and Ethiopia, from where they were repatriated. Others were evacuated with Boeing 727 and Lockheed C-130 Hercules aircraft from Nakasongola and Natiswera, a dirt strip north of Kampala. Amin and his family also fled to Libya.

About 600 Libyans were killed during the Uganda–Tanzania War, 1,800 were wounded, while 56 or 59 were captured and later released by the Tanzanians. Journalist J. P. Smith argued that these were "serious losses in a country of only 2.7 million people". The Libyans lost more men in Uganda than during the Egyptian–Libyan War of 1977. There were several cases during the war when captured Libyans were executed by Tanzanian soldiers or Ugandan rebels. Tanzanian political officers told their soldiers that the "Arabs" were coming into Sub-Saharan Africa to re-establish slavery, making TPDF troops unwilling to take prisoners. In response to widespread support or sympathy for Amin by the Arab world, members of the Ugandan opposition threatened to kill every captured Arab combatant. In one incident, FRONASA rebels allegedly massacred a group of captured Libyans at a Roman Catholic convent near Kampala. Scattered groups of Libyan soldiers still roamed parts of Uganda after the war was officially over; these stragglers were generally murdered by Ugandan civilians upon being discovered, and their corpses displayed in Kampala's "market center" until the TPDF removed them.

==== Analyses and aftermath ====
Pollack attributed Libyan troops' failures to their low morale and lack of military intelligence. They had no experience operating in Uganda's climate, and most Libyan soldiers were badly trained militiamen who were unprepared for such an operation. Rwehururu also stated that the Libyan uniforms were not fit for jungle warfare. Even under these conditions, however, the combat performance of the Libyans was poor; they generally failed to hold ground even in favorable situations and with access to much better equipment than the Tanzanians. Pollack pointed out that the Libyans failed to use aerial reconnaissance, send out patrols to gather intelligence, and guard their flanks, causing them to "blunder[ ] around Uganda blind". He also faulted their general inability to use their heavy equipment as well as their officers' lack of initiative or adaptability. Security consultant Andrew McGregor also argued that "confusion reigned" among the Libyan intervention force, and that the entire operation was a "military disaster". Lemarchand argued that the intervention force was too small and composed of too many poorly trained as well as poorly motivated troops to make a major impact on the war. As a result of its small size, the lack of an intelligence system, and its poor communications with the native population, the Libyan force was dependent on the Uganda Army to function and thus "shared fully in the organizational collapse of Amin's army". Overall, Lemarchand concluded that "Libyan performance was disastrous".

In contrast to the intervention force's otherwise poor performance, both Pollack and Lemarchand stated that Libyan logistics were a success, pointing out that the Libyan troops never lacked supplies despite the adverse conditions. Pollack singled out the airlift as an "impressive operation for any country, let alone a resource-poor nation desperate for technically competent personnel such as Libya".

The defeat in Uganda caused significant tensions and resentment in Libya. It was a serious setback for Gaddafi's foreign policy, and reportedly caused conflict within the Libyan government. The Libyan Armed Forces were reportedly upset about their "disgraceful rout". There were public protests during and after the war. Many Libyans were buried in mass graves in Uganda. One better known mass grave is located at the King's College Budo. According to the German newspaper Der Spiegel, Gaddafi ordered some of the dead soldiers to be buried in mass graves in Libya's deserts without the families' knowledge. After the conflict, several graffiti appeared on walls in Tripoli's harbor area, stating "Utrudu Katala" ("Killer out") which referenced either Gaddafi or Idi Amin who was living in the city after escaping Uganda. At the time, Libyan civilians who observed Amin without permission or tried to contact him were arrested by Libyan security forces. Amin left the country after his personal guards got into a "violent dispute" with the Libyan authorities.

Libya maintained a presence in Uganda during the following decades, and continued to exert limited economic, political, and military influence. In 2008, Gaddafi was supposed to visit Uganda and unveil a plaque near the Uganda-Tanzania border which honored the Libyan intervention force. The event was cancelled after Gaddafi was told by Ugandan mufti Obeid Kamulegeya that President Yoweri Museveni had allegedly taken part in the massacre committed by FRONASA militants in 1979. In turn, Museveni later criticised Gaddafi's decision to intervene in the Uganda–Tanzania War, arguing that the assumption that Uganda was a "Muslim country" where Amin and other Muslims were threatened by Christian oppression was false.

=== Pakistan ===
Idi Amin had forged links with Pakistan and hired Pakistanis to replace Asian civil servants and technical personnel who had been expelled in 1972. Some Pakistani experts supportive of Amin reportedly saw him as a champion of Islam. About 200–350 Pakistani experts had been stationed in Uganda since early 1978, providing crucial support to Uganda's struggling medical sector, administration, economy, and judicial system.

When Ugandan Minister of Finance Moses Ali (who had close connections with Pakistan) was fired in 1978, Pakistan–Uganda relations worsened significantly and a large number of Pakistani personnel was expelled from the country. However, several Pakistanis continued to stay in Uganda and supported Amin's government during the war. The journal Africa stated that "informed sources" claimed that "Pakistani technicians and air force personnel" were backing the Uganda Army in its operations against the TPDF. The Pakistani chargé d'affaires continued to act as Amin's self-appointed "eyes and ears" until a group of Ugandan soldiers threatened his family amid the deteriorating security situation, prompting him to flee to Kenya. The two most prominent individuals of Pakistani origin in Amin's regime were Faruk Malik, an intelligence officer, and Mohamed Said, chief Justice of Uganda. Both attempted to bolster the Ugandan government during the war, and only fled shortly before the Fall of Kampala.

One Pakistani national was captured by the TPDF during the war. He had been serving with the Libyans. Libya was known to use "Pakistani instructors" to support its allies.

=== Saudi Arabia ===
Amin reportedly travelled to Saudi Arabia twice to ask for financial aid during the Uganda–Tanzania War. According to "intelligence sources", he also asked Saudi Arabia to send troops to aid his government. African Review stated that Saudi Arabia provided "military assistance" to Amin's government in 1978/79. Journalist Mark Yared also claimed that Saudi Arabia supported Amin during the war.

== Confirmed support by non-state actors ==
=== Palestine Liberation Organisation ===
Before the Uganda–Tanzania War, the PLO had a strong presence in Uganda, using the country to train fighters and pilots. About 400 Palestinian fighters were stationed for training in Uganda. In return for the Ugandan support, PLO members operated as pilots in the Uganda Army Air Force and supported the State Research Bureau (SRB), the Ugandan intelligence agency. They also sent medics and teachers to Uganda. The local PLO embassy staff often advised the Ugandan government. According to a Palestinian source, PLO ambassador Khaled El Sheikh was even consulted on the appointment of Ugandan ministers. Palestinians served in Amin's personal guard.

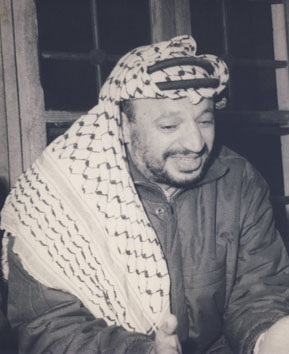
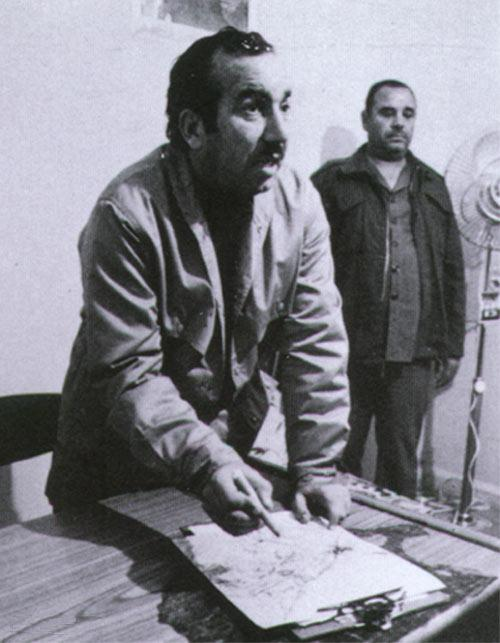
The PLO leadership, including Yasser Arafat (left, pictured 1974) and Khalil al-Wazir (right, pictured 1970) decided to support Amin to maintain the Palestinian presence in Uganda.

Following the Ugandan invasion of Kagera, the PLO sent its troops to serve alongside the Uganda Army at the Tanzanian border. The Palestinians regarded Amin as an important ally, and regarded the war with Tanzania as a possible threat to their own presence in the region. Several PLO troops belonging to Fatah were killed in clashes with the TPDF along the Ugandan-Tanzanian border and south of Masaka. The Tanzanians identified them based on their typical scarves and identity cards. At an early stage of the war, PLO general political commissioner Izzat Abu al-Rub was sent to Uganda to assess the situation. Following a meeting with Amin, he conducted a number of field tours. Izzat Abu al-Rub judged that the Ugandan government was in dire need of military support, while its downfall would harm the PLO's cause. Accordingly, PLO leaders Yasser Arafat, Khalil al-Wazir, and Saad Sayel decided to send further aid to Uganda. They dispatched a team of experts, consisting of Colonel Mutlaq Hamdan (alias "Abu Fawaz"), the head of the PLO Military College, Major Wassef Erekat, artillery commander, Captain Jumaa Hassan Hamdallah, and Captain Ibrahim Awad. They were supposed to assist the Ugandan high command in organizing the war effort. In addition, 40 other PLO guerrillas were sent with a Libyan contingent. Mugabe claimed that PLO commandos were covertly sent to Uganda by December 1978. According to foreign diplomats based in Kampala, the PLO dispatched 15 pilots to aid Amin during the war, but played no role in the conflict due to a lack of available operational aircraft upon on their arrival. PLO agents also helped the SRB to suppress dissidents during the war. At the time, one especially notorious PLO operative in the SRB was "Hassan, the fat Palestinian from Liberia". Despite the widespread reports about the Palestinian presence, the PLO repeatedly denied its involvement in the war, insisting that its forces were on a simple non-combat "training mission" in Uganda.

The PLO commanders were deeply involved in planning a counter-offensive to drive back the TPDF which had occupied southern Uganda. This combined Ugandan-Libyan-Palestinian operation resulted in the Battle of Lukaya during which PLO fighters served in the Ugandan units, with Colonel Hamdan co-commanding tank and infantry forces, while Major Erekat assumed command of part of the artillery. The PLO later claimed that only 1 Palestinian was killed, and 8 wounded, including Hamdan, Erekat, and Awad. The latter were subsequently evacuated, and treated at a hospital in Athens. After the Battle of Lukaya, Amin declared on radio that the PLO was fighting alongside the Uganda Army. Regardless, the Palestinians continued to officially deny their involvement. A PLO envoy told Tanzanian officials on 21 March that his organization wanted to maintain good relations with Tanzania.

Following the defeat at Lukaya, the PLO leadership sent Mahmoud Da'as as new commander with a last batch of 75 guerrillas as reinforcements. As part of this group, Colonel Abd al-Ghaffar Hilmi al-Ghoul sent a platoon of the Fatah's elite Force 17. Realizing that the war was lost, Da'as organized his forces into two groups. One continued to assist the Ugandans in defending Kampala, the other secured evacuation routes from Uganda. At the time of the Tanzanian Operation Dada Idi, PLO troops were stationed at Mpigi south of the Ugandan capital. After resisting some time during the Fall of Kampala, the PLO troops withdrew into northern Uganda. Da'as reportedly managed to safely bring most of his men to Sudan.

Several PLO fighters were killed during the conflict, though their number remains disputed. The PLO admitted to have lost twelve fighters in Uganda, counting the dead and those missing in action. In contrast, Tanzanian officers claimed that 200 Palestinians had been killed during the conflict. According to Mugabe, a number of PLO commandos surrendered to the TPDF, and were repatriated following "long diplomatic negotiations".

Following the Uganda–Tanzania War, the PLO was able to maintain good relations with Tanzania, as President Nyerere believed that the Palestinians had only supported Amin due to their lack of other allies. He even allowed the organization to elevate its office in Dar es Salaam to full embassy. Several PLO officers involved in the Uganda–Tanzania War rose to high positions: Both Erekat as well as Da'as were eventually promoted to major generals; Da'as became head of the PLO's Yarmouk Forces after Saad Sayel's death.

=== Weapons merchants ===
Starting in 1977, Uganda received crucial military support from weapons merchant and ex-CIA agent Frank Terpil. His Paris-based company Intercontinental Technology provided Amin with guns, ammunition, explosives, surveillance equipment and other military hardware. He worked closely with Amin who gave him the nickname Waraki ("white lightning"). Terpil's company also helped to train SRB agents. Based on their investigations, journalists Tony Avirgan and Martha Honey suspected that Terpil had continued to cooperate with the CIA, the U.S. government, and ranking U.S. as well as British military officials during his dealings with Amin's government. Terpil operated in Uganda during the Uganda–Tanzania War and stayed by Amin's side when the latter fled to Libya. The weapons merchant allegedly smuggled "steel trunk-loads of gold" out of the country in April 1979. Terpil maintained links with Idi Amin after the latter had relocated to Saudi Arabia.

George Gregory Korkala was another weapons merchant who provided the Ugandan government with weaponry before and during the Uganda–Tanzania War.

=== U.S. American, British, and Kenyan companies ===
Several U.S. American companies had maintained links with Idi Amin's government until the United States Congress imposed a trade embargo on Uganda in October 1978. Regardless, the United States-based Harris Corporation covertly maintained its presence in Uganda, and even increased its cooperation with Amin's regime. It sold the Ugandan government communications technology, and traded in Ugandan coffee, providing Amin with important funds and equipment. Harris continued to operate in Uganda throughout the Uganda–Tanzania War. Another U.S. company, Page Airways, also continued to aid the Ugandan government in conducting the "Whisky Shuttles" until March 1979. The "Whisky Shuttles" were cargo flights that carried Ugandan exports in coffee and tea as well as imports in luxury goods that were crucial in maintaining the Uganda Army's loyalty to Amin. In doing so, Page Airways also cooperated with the CIA, Israeli Mossad, and British intelligence.

The British company Pye supplied telecommunications equipment to the SRB, and continued to do so until February 1979. The Kenya-based Wilkins Telecommunications channeled weaponry and spy equipment to the SRB until February 1979.

=== Islamic World Bank ===
Supportive of Libya and Amin, the Islamic World Bank provided Uganda with four million dollars on 15 March 1979.

== Disputed or unconfirmed allegations of support ==
=== Kenya ===
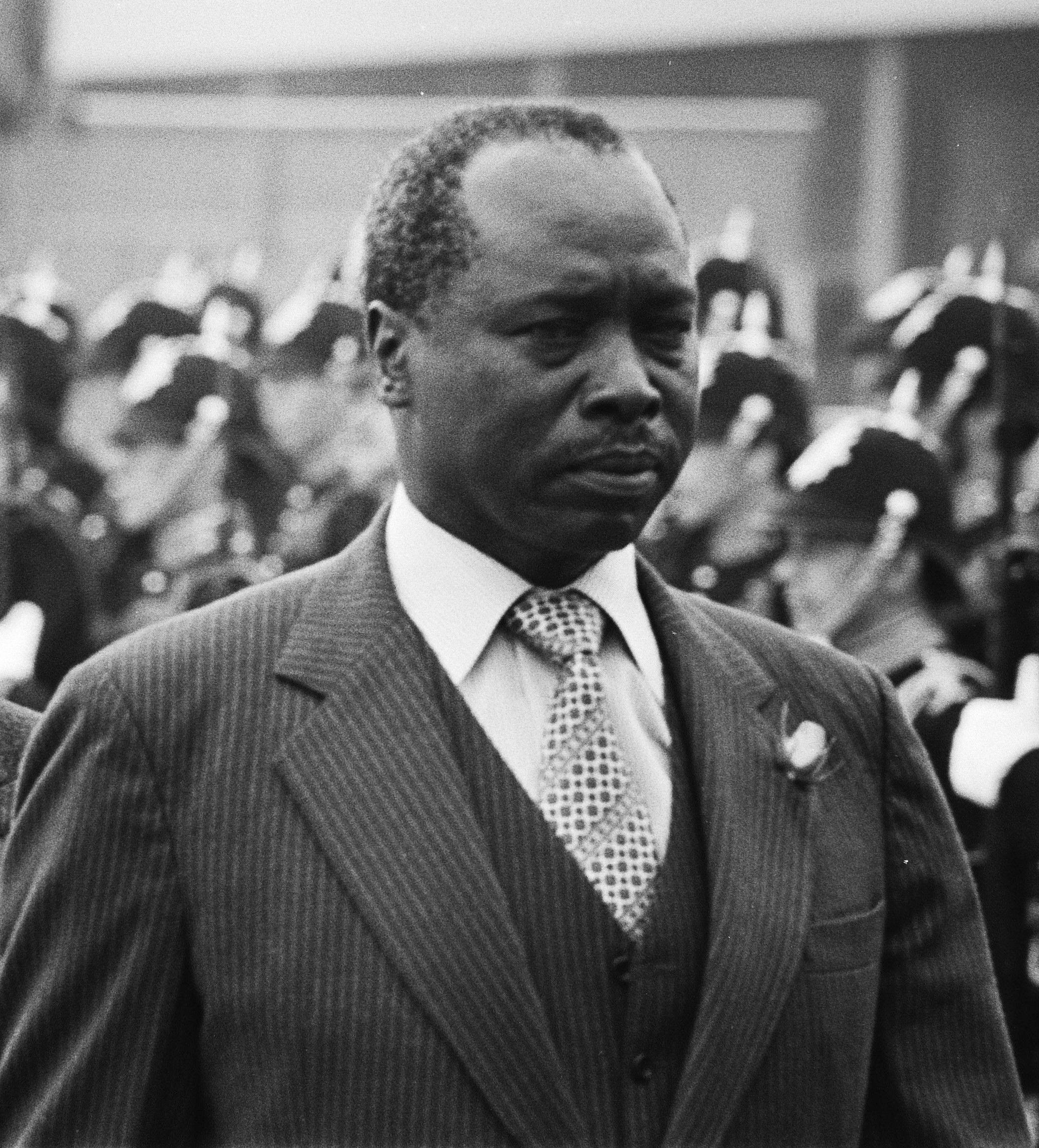
Kenya under President Daniel arap Moi (pictured 1979) maintained crucial economic ties with Uganda during the war.

The relations between Uganda under Amin and Kenya experienced significant ups-and-downs from 1971 to 1979. Despite occasional tensions, however, the two countries maintained strong trade. Amin's hostility to Tanzania was beneficial to Kenya, as Kenyan leaders opposed Tanzania's socialist orientation. Kenyan President Daniel arap Moi concluded in 1978 that the overthrow of Amin would primarily benefit ex-President Milton Obote whom the Kenyan leadership deeply distrusted. As a result, according to journalists Tony Avirgan and Martha Honey, the Kenyan government provided Amin with "support [...] literally until just before Tanzanian troops marched into Kampala". Conversely, political scientist Chris Ikalikha Musambayi characterised Moi's response to the war vis-à-vis Amin's regime as marked by "ambiguity", which the Tanzanians interpreted as support for Uganda. Shortly after the outbreak of war, Nyerere appealed to Kenya to halt shipments of fuel to Uganda, but his request went unheeded. Amin's close adviser, Bob Astles, told Indian diplomat Madanjeet Singh that he had visited Moi in Kenya who had given him assurances that "Kenya shall give Uganda every transit facility that we need, and that he will tell President Nyerere not to interfere in Uganda's internal affairs." Kenyan authorities disrupted efforts of Ugandan exiles to organise in their country, arresting some guerillas and in a few instances turned them over to the Ugandan government. At the beginning of 1979 the Kenyan government restricted the movement of all Ugandan nationals in and out of the country, though some influential Kenyans such as opposition leader Jaramogi Oginga Odinga continued to channel Ugandan rebels through the country.

In February, Amin publicly requested five countries, among them Kenya, to diplomatically intervene in the war and convince Tanzania to stop its invasion. In March Ugandan exiles attempted to leave the country to meet with others in Tanzania for a rebel unity conference but were detained at the border. The Kenyan government soon thereafter released them in Nairobi but refused to allow them to travel to the meeting, citing its "neutrality" in the war. In 1980, The Ugandan Times, a newspaper overseen by Uganda's post-Amin government, accused Moi's government of aiding Amin during the war. The accusation was negatively received in Kenya.

=== Soviet Union ===
The Soviet Union and the Eastern Bloc were Amin's most important suppliers of military equipment, although there were repeated phases of tension between Uganda and the Soviets. The Ugandan President attempted to exploit Soviet aid as much as possible without following a continuous pro-Soviet foreign policy or allowing a pro-Soviet bloc emerge in his military. Relations between Uganda and the Soviet Union soured in 1978 when the latter refused to sell Amin any more military hardware. When the war with Tanzania broke out, the Soviet Union appeared "paralysed", as Amin remained its ally but supporting him seemed to promise few if any rewards. The conflict with Tanzania was especially "awkward", as the Soviet Union was also supportive of Tanzania at the time. At the war's outbreak, the Soviet Union had a team of 250 military experts serve as trainers in Uganda, headed by Colonel Datsenko.

Accordingly, the Soviet reaction to the Uganda–Tanzania War was low-key and muted, with no initial public comment on the war. On 30 October 1978, the Ugandan Foreign Ministry announced that Soviet air force personnel loaned to Uganda were being placed on leave "to keep them out of the situation that does not concern them" in regards to the war with Tanzania. Cuban ambassador Edmundo Romero also claimed that 50 Soviet advisers had been placed on leave to avoid their involvement in the conflict. However, Soviet ambassador to Uganda E.V. Moussikyo dismissed these claims as "nonsense". He claimed that Soviet military advisers based in Mbarara had told him that the Uganda Army had experienced a series of mutinies, and was not fighting Tanzania. On 1 November 1978, Voice of Uganda proclaimed that Amin had met with Moussikyo, clarifying that the Ugandan President wanted to keep Soviet pilots out of the conflict as to avoid a propaganda coup by anti-Soviet "imperialists". He used the occasion to praise the Soviet support of his air force, noting that Ugandan pilot Lieutenant David Omita had survived being shot down by the Tanzanians due to his "good training" by Soviet experts. Amin also claimed that he wanted the Soviets to continue aid Tanzania.

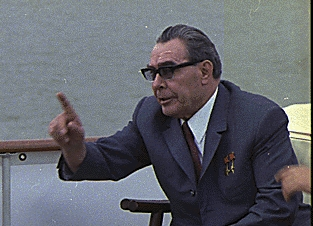
Leonid Brezhnev (pictured 1973) appealed to Idi Amin and Julius Nyerere to make peace.

The first official mention of the conflict in the Soviet Union occurred only on 12 November 1978 when Pravda claimed that the war was exploited by imperialist powers to distract forces involved in the Rhodesian Bush War. The Soviet news agency TASS continued to infrequently cover the war. Soviet General Secretary Leonid Brezhnev sent two private messages to Amin and Nyerere, calling for peace. The Soviet Union reportedly stopped shipping arms to Uganda and announced the withdrawal of all of its military advisers. The Soviet government extended its assurances to Nyerere that no technical assistance would be given to Uganda during the war.

Regardless, there were reports of continued Soviet support for Uganda. Soviet advisers continued to operate in Uganda as of early 1979. In January 1979, Colonel Datsenko was called back to the Soviet Union, and replaced by a new military specialist, Colonel Protassenia. At a party to say goodbye to Colonel Datsenko and welcome Colonel Protassenia, Ugandan Brigadier Taban Lupayi praised the Soviet experts, and their ongoing aid to the Ugandan military. After Tanzanian rockets struck the Lukoma air strip, Soviet military advisers helped to identify the missiles. Journalist James McManus stated in March 1979 that the Soviet advisers "apparently still serve parts of the military machine" of Uganda. According to Ugandan officer Bernard Rwehururu, the Soviets actually offered Amin's government substantial military support during the earlier stages of the war, but were turned down due to the President's distrust about Soviet-Tanzanian links. In contrast, Western journalists and diplomats claimed that the Soviet leadership ignored and rejected appeals by Amin for help in late 1978 and early 1979. In late March, ambassador Moussikyo stated that he had rejected requests by Amin to provide the Uganda Army with spare parts. According to the journal Africa Confidential, however, a Bulgarian Air Force aircraft reportedly arrived at Entebbe carrying weaponry for the Uganda Army shortly before the Fall of Kampala. Researcher Layi Abegunrin noted that "Bulgaria is a member of the Warsaw Pact and thus connected with the Soviet Union." By the later stages of the war, ambassador Moussikyo converted his house in Kampala into "a small fortress" guarded by heavily armed "Russian[s]".

At the same time, the Soviet Union maintained its supportive stance toward Tanzania. It and other Eastern Bloc states declared their willingness to sell the Tanzanians military equipment during the war, but demanded advance payments. The Soviet Union also did not comment on the Tanzanian invasion of Uganda, while the Soviet leadership allowed students in Moscow to protest against the Libyan intervention. (Note: There were also reports of Soviet advisers "in Mwanza, conferring openly with Tanzanian soldiers in battle dress" and training Tanzanian pilots in late 1978. However, Avirgan and Honey argue that Mozambican soldiers were the only foreigners to serve on Tanzania's behalf. The claims about the presence of foreigners probably stemmed from the diverse ethnic and racial composition of the TPDF.) Regardless, Abegunrin argued that the Tanzanian-Soviet relations were generally "strained" during the war. Soviet media continued to voice tacit support for Amin until late April 1979 when Pravda openly criticized his deposed regime, stating that he had ruined Uganda. According to journalist Kevin Klose, this move matched "longstanding Soviet practice of backing winners in the Third World no matter what ideological contortions may be required."

=== Morocco ===
There were reports of Moroccan troops being sent to Amin's aid in 1979. In early February 1979, air traffic controllers claimed that Moroccan advisers had been flown into Uganda. Nairobi-based diplomats opposed to the Ugandan government also stated that Moroccans were among the "thousands of Arab troops" sent to support Uganda. The journal Africa specified that Morocco had sent some troops who had been stationed in Zaire to Uganda to aid Amin. According to journalist Raghida Dergham, Algerian aid to Tanzania "pulled in Morocco on the side of Uganda".

These reports were strongly denied by the Moroccan government. According to researcher Muwonge Magembe, Amin requested assistance from King Hassan II through President Mobutu Sese Seko of Zaire, but the United States Central Intelligence Agency and the United Kingdom Secret Intelligence Service sabotaged his appeal.

=== Zaire ===
Researcher Amii Omara-Otunnu stated that Zaire sent troops to aid Uganda against Tanzania. In February 1979, Zaire was one of the countries of whom Amin requested diplomatic support to stop the Tanzanian invasion.

=== East Germany ===
From 1975 to 1977, East Germany had sent Stasi agents to Uganda to support the State Research Bureau (SRB). According to a Ugandan source, at least two East Germans continued to work at the SRB until the collapse of Amin's regime during the Uganda–Tanzania War. The East German ambassador Gottfried Lessing as well as the East German consul and their wives were killed in an attempt to flee during the fall of Kampala. As other Eastern Bloc-aligned diplomats had left the Ugandan capital before the Tanzanian assault, it remains unclear why the East German group had initially stayed behind and only attempted to flee after the battle had started. Ugandans speculated that the East German contingent had tried to escape the city because they had feared repercussions if the links between East Germany and the SRB were discovered. The South African secret police maintained that Lessing had operated as undercover KGB agent, although this claim was never substantiated.

=== ZANU, Rhodesia, and South Africa ===
Tanzanian statesmen and journalists, Mozambican authorities, and some international observers speculated that the entire war was part of an "imperialist plot" by foreign agents who had influenced Amin. Accordingly, the invasion of Kagera was supposed to draw Tanzania's attention away from other conflicts in southern and western Africa, weakening the so-called Frontline States. Tanzanian Foreign Minister Benjamin Mpaka alleged that the Lonrho Company or Ndabaningi Sithole's ZANU faction might have been involved, though he admitted that he had no proof for these theories. Before the Uganda–Tanzania War, Uganda had financially supported and trained a disputed number of ZANU militants loyal to Sithole. (Note: Despite opposing white minority rule in Rhodesia, Sithole's ZANU faction had joined a coalition government in 1978 and began to tacitly cooperate with the Rhodesian Security Forces, causing observers to link Sithole with the "reactionary" regimes of South Africa, Rhodesia, and others. However, the Rhodesian leadership considered the Ugandan-trained ZANU fighters merely "mafia-type gangs" and at least once massacred a group of them.) Amin called these troops the "Zimbabwe Striking Force". The Rhodesian Air Force reportedly flew 48 of these militants back to Rhodesia to operate as auxiliaries around June 1978, while Catholic missionaries claimed that Sithole loyalists were training in Uganda as late as November 1978. Tanzanian President Julius Nyerere and Mozambican President Samora Machel reportedly concluded during a meeting in November 1978 that Uganda's attack on Tanzania was supposed to strengthen the Rhodesian government and its allies, including Sithole. In the same month, a Tanzanian diplomat inquired whether the British government thought that Sithole had sent his "army" to Uganda just before the war's start. Following the Fall of Kampala, there were reports that members of Sithole's faction (including those present for military training) were fleeing Uganda alongside Amin's loyalists. They reportedly relocated to Ugandan refugee camps in Sudan and Kenya. (Note: There were also claims (possibly spread by Abel Muzorewa's representatives) that ZANLA fighters who were aligned with the non-Sithole ZANU faction fought alongside the Tanzanians. This caused Gaddafi to order the ZANU leadership to withdraw the alleged ZANLA contingent fighting in Uganda, threatening to deploy ZANLA militants training in Libya to fight in an Egyptian border conflict if this demand was not met. Amin was overthrown before the dispute over ZANLA's involvement was solved.)

Several Polish-made T-55 tanks destined for Amin's regime were diverted to Rhodesia by South Africa in 1979.

=== Iraq ===
According to Honey, there were "some indications" that Iraq supplied Uganda with weaponry in 1978–1979. Ugandan officials including the minister of defense made several trips to Iraq during the conflict. Yared also claimed that Iraq supported Amin during the war. After the Fall of Kampala, "Arab diplomatic sources" claimed that Amin travelled to Iraq in his private jet, reportedly asking for "arms and assistance". Unspecified "intelligence sources" stated that Amin had requested Iraq to send soldiers to turn the war in his favor. After his exile in Libya, Amin relocated to and lived in Iraq before permanently settling Saudi Arabia.

=== Syria, Kuwait, United Arab Emirates, Sudan, Egypt ===
Yared stated that Syria, Kuwait, the United Arab Emirates, Sudan, and Egypt provided Amin with "multiform aid" during the war. Amin requested military assistance in Egypt during a visit in October 1978. Mugabe stated that Egyptian President Anwar Sadat reportedly offered Amin military equipment. According to Honey, "intelligence sources" stated that Amin had requested Syria to send soldiers to turn the war in his favor.

=== North Korea ===
North Korea had supplied Uganda with weaponry and trained some of its troops during Idi Amin's rule. According to researcher Andrea Berger, this "relationship" endured until Amin was overthrown during the Uganda–Tanzania War. In contrast, researcher Benjamin Young contends that North Korean advisers aided Tanzania in overthrowing Amin.
