= Lukaya =

Lukaya may refer to:

- Lukaya, Uganda, a town in Kalungu District, Central Uganda
  - Battle of Lukaya, 1979
- Lukaya District, a district in Bas-Congo province, in the Democratic Republic of the Congo
- Lukaya River, a river in the Democratic Republic of the Congo
