= Taban Lupayi =

Sudanese-Ugandan military officer

- Born: Southern Sudan
- Military career
- Allegiance: Uganda
- Branch: Uganda Army
- Service years: ? – 1979
- Rank: Brigadier
- Commands: Marine Regiment
- Conflicts: Arube uprising; Uganda–Tanzania War

Taban Lupayi, often just called Taban, (Note: Also known as Flassan Taban, Taban Lupavi, Taban Lupayigana, and Taban Lopayi) was a high-ranking Sudanese-born Ugandan military officer during the dictatorship of Idi Amin. He rose to commander of the Marine Regiment and deputy chief of staff of the Uganda Army following the 1971 Ugandan coup d'état, and became a member of Amin's inner circle. Taban deserted his post during the Uganda–Tanzania War in 1979, fleeing to southern Sudan.

== Biography ==
=== Early life and rise to power ===
An ethnic Nubian and/or Pojulu, Taban was a Muslim and nephew of Idi Amin. He was born in southern Sudan. In his early life, he worked as a houseboy and had very little education. Africa Confidential claimed that Taban was illiterate. He eventually joined the Uganda Army, and served as a private during the presidency of Milton Obote. When tensions rose between Obote and army commander Idi Amin, the latter organized a bodyguard of trusted soldiers, including Taban.

Following the 1971 Ugandan coup d'état which allowed Amin to seize the presidency, Taban was promoted to officer in the Uganda Army. His rise was the result of his connections to Amin and his lowly background, as the new president feared that better-educated officers could eventually overthrow him and wanted to check their influence. According to researcher Samuel Decalo, Taban was a "particularly nasty and rowdy commander". Taban became part of the Libyan-trained Marine Regiment. He was promoted to major and second-in-command of the unit in January 1974. Later that year, he became its chief commander, holding this position until 1979. In March 1974, dissident soldiers attempted to overthrow Amin in the Arube uprising; Taban was one of the Amin loyalists whom the rebels intended to kill or arrest. Under his leadership, the Marines played a major role in defeating the coup attempt.

At some point, Taban became a member of the Defense Council which factually governed Uganda under Amin. Like many high-ranking officers, Taban was engaged in smuggling on Lake Victoria. He consequently clashed with the Anti-Smuggling Unit (ASU), threatening and possibly murdering ASU agents to maintain his criminal activities. Over time, he developed a rivalry with Vice President Mustafa Adrisi; the two were even engaged in a shootout at some point. Adrisi was removed from power by Amin in April 1978. Taban was promoted from lieutenant colonel to brigadier in the following month. He eventually became deputy chief of staff as well. By late 1978, Taban was one of the few remaining members of Amin's inner circle after repeated purges.

=== Uganda–Tanzania War and exile ===
Tensions between Uganda and the neighboring country of Tanzania were high during Amin's rule. Taban was among the Uganda Army officers who called for a preemptive attack. In late 1978, the Uganda–Tanzania War broke out under unclear circumstances. After an initial Ugandan invasion of Tanzanian territory was defeated, the Tanzania People's Defence Force (TPDF) launched a counter-invasion and overran the border town of Mutukula on 21–22 January 1979. Although the garrison had been promised immediate reinforcements, these never arrived. Shortly after the battle, Taban and Lieutenant Colonel Godwin Sule arrived with a helicopter at nearby Sanje, to where the Mutukula garrison had retreated. They informed the local commander, Bernard Rwehururu, that the reinforcements had halted in Lukaya, 120 kilometres (75 mi) to the north. This information was received badly by the local troops; Sule sensed that the soldiers could possibly revolt and instructed Taban to order the reinforcements to advance so that they could relieve Rwehururu's men. Regardless, the troops remained restitive. A warrant officer informed Taban that some angry infantrymen might be tempted to shoot the officers, causing Sule and Taban to quickly leave in their helicopter. At some point in January, Taban attended a party for the Soviet military advisers to Uganda, using the occasion to praise their aid to the Ugandan military.

The Marines were among the last elements of the Uganda Army that stayed loyal to Amin in the Uganda–Tanzania War's later sages. According to Amin's son Jaffar Rembo, however, Taban and many of the Sudanese soldiers in the Marine Regiment fled the frontlines around the time of the Battle of Lukaya. Jaffar accused Taban and other high-ranking Ugandan commanders of having been bribed by the Tanzanians to mishandle the army. Taban initially fled north from Kampala to Arua before ultimately escaping to Sudan and settling down in Yei. A Drum reporter later encountered him there by chance, describing him as a "very frightened man". In 1983, Africa Confidential reported that Taban was still living in "oblivion" in Yei, hoping for Amin's eventual return to power in Uganda.
