= Battle of Mutukula =

1979 Uganda-Tanzania War battle

- Part of the Uganda–Tanzania War
- Battle of Mutukula (Uganda)
Date	21–22 January 1979
Location	Mutukula, Uganda 0°59′51″S 31°24′54″E
Result	Tanzanian victory
Territorial changes	Mutukula captured by Tanzanian forces

Belligerents
Tanzania	Uganda

Commanders and leaders
Mwita Marwa; Salim Hassan Boma	Yefusa Bananuka; Bernard Rwehururu; Abdulatif Tiyua

Units involved
208th Brigade	Gondo Battalion; Suicide Battalion

Strength
1 brigade	Unknown

Casualties and losses
3 killed dozens wounded	14 killed 2 captured 1 tank destroyed 1 tank damaged 1 tank captured 3 APCs destroyed

The Battle of Mutukula (Kiswahili: Mapigano ya Mutukula) took place from 21 to 22 January 1979 near and in the town of Mutukula, Uganda, during the Uganda–Tanzania War. After repulsing a Ugandan invasion of the Kagera Salient in 1978, Tanzanian commanders feared that Ugandan forces stationed upon the high ground in Mutukula, a town located along the Tanzania–Uganda border, still posed a threat to their territory. On the night of 21 January 1979 the Tanzanian 208th Brigade crossed the border and surrounded the town. The following morning it attacked, and the Ugandan garrison—including the Gondo and Suicide Battalions—fled. Afterwards the Tanzanians razed the locale in revenge for the damage wrought by the Ugandans in Kagera.

== Background ==
In 1971 Colonel Idi Amin launched a military coup that overthrew the President of Uganda, Milton Obote, precipitating a deterioration of relations with the neighbouring state of Tanzania. Amin installed himself as president and ruled the country under a repressive dictatorship. In October 1978 he launched an invasion of Tanzania. On 1 November he announced the annexation of the Kagera Salient, an 1,800 square kilometre (694.9839 square mile) strip of land between the Ugandan border and the Kagera River. Ugandan troops subsequently pillaged the area they occupied, murdering civilians, stealing cattle, and destroying property, triggering the flight of 40,000 inhabitants southward. In November the Tanzania People's Defence Force (TPDF) launched a counterattack, retaking the salient, while the Ugandans withdrew to the border. Tanzanian commanders nevertheless felt that as long as Ugandan troops controlled the high ground at Mutukula along the frontier they posed a threat to the salient. Tanzanian President Julius Nyerere toured Kagera in late November. Able to see Ugandan troops encamped on the high ground through binoculars, Nyerere was moved to agree with his officers and ordered them to capture Mutukula.

While sporadic clashes occurred along the border over the next two months, the TPDF made preparations to attack Mutukula. The TPDF's Southern Brigade was renamed the 208th Brigade and its command was handed to Brigadier Mwita Marwa. In late December, the TPDF began launching heavy rocket attacks against Ugandan positions along the border, continuing into the next month. Despite the ongoing fighting, the Ugandan high command did not believe that the Tanzanians would cross the border and thus left just 3,000 troops on the entire frontline. On the night of 21 January 1979 several battalions of the TPDF'S 208th Brigade crossed the Ugandan border and covertly assumed positions north and west of Mutukula. The Mutukula garrison included the Uganda Army's Gondo Battalion, led by Lieutenant Colonel Yefusa Bananuka, and the Suicide Battalion, led by Lieutenant Colonel Bernard Rwehururu.

== Battle ==
Tanzanian and Ugandan troops began exchanging fire at 22:00 on 21 January during a rainstorm. Rwehururu attempted to telephone the Uganda Army Chief of Staff, Major General Yusuf Gowon, but was unable to reach him. Early in the morning of 22 January, Rwehururu telephoned Amin and informed him of the attack. Amin later told Rwehururu that Mutukula would be provided heavy air support and reinforcements. At dawn, a TPDF battalion commanded by Lieutenant Colonel Salim Hassan Boma and equipped with tanks advanced down the main road from Tanzania towards Mutukula in an attempt to draw the Ugandans' attention. The Ugandan troops concentrated their fire on Boma's battalion, including bombarding them with artillery stationed to the rear of Kikanda Hill further north. With the Ugandan flanks left exposed, the other TPDF battalions initiated their attack, launching Katyusha rockets at the Ugandans, who were caught by surprise. Most of the Ugandan troops, including the Suicide Battalion, panicked and fled, leaving their weapons behind.

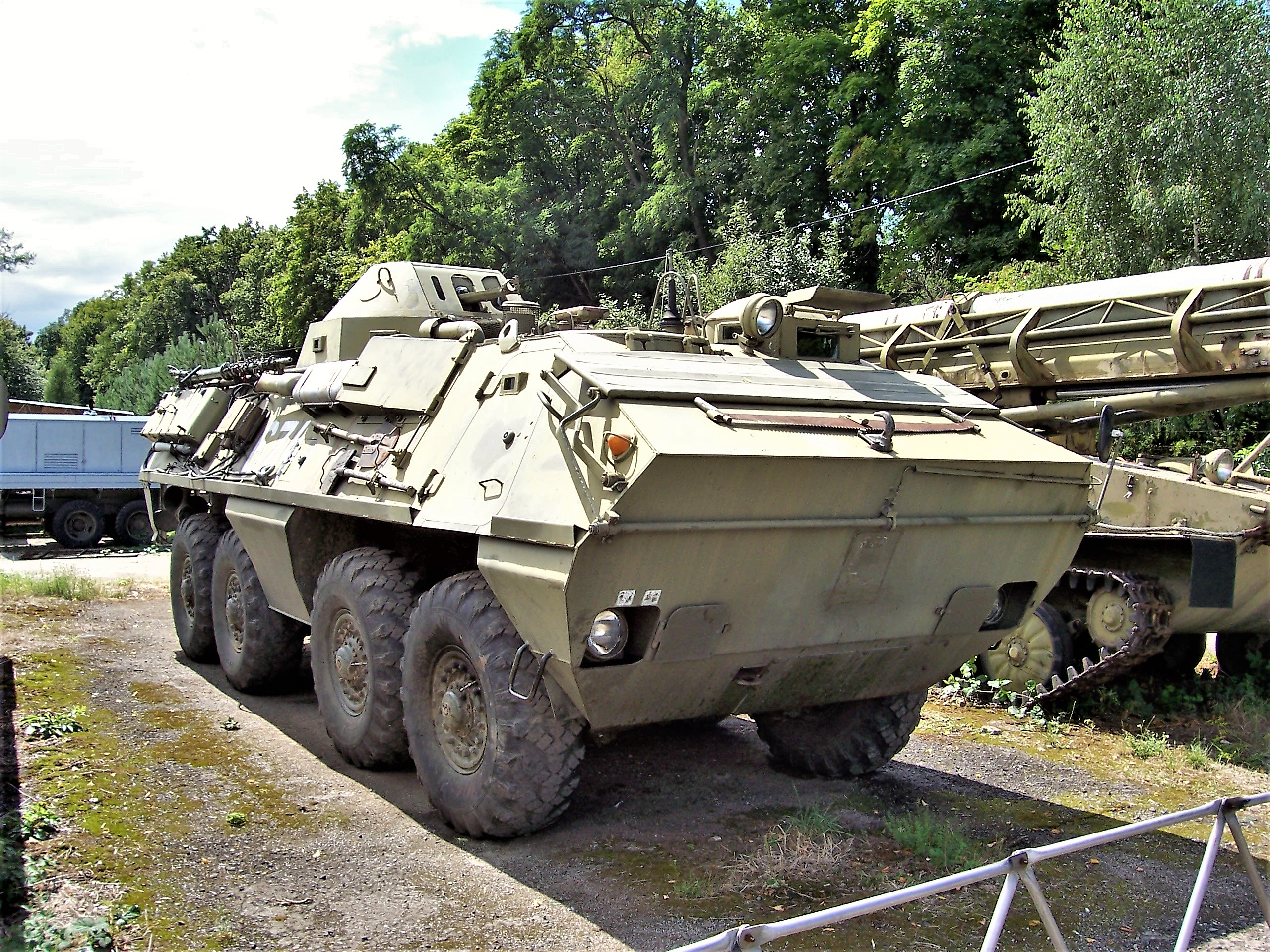
Three OT-64 SKOT armoured personnel carriers (example pictured) were destroyed during the battle.

Artillery struck near Bananuka's trench, burying him in soil. The soldiers in his vicinity believed him to be dead and subsequently fled while his deputy, Lieutenant Colonel Abdulatif Tiyua, allegedly issued orders to the Gondo Battalion to retreat, stating that the orders had been given by Bananuka. Bananuka was able to dig himself out and escape to his temporary headquarters in Kakuuto. In the town Tanzanian tanks encountered a platoon of Ugandan M4 Sherman tanks. In a short battle, the Tanzanians destroyed one of the Shermans, whereupon the rest quickly withdrew. The Ugandan tank commander, Captain Muzamir Amule, was able to tow his damaged tank away from the battle. By 11:00, Mutukula was overrun. Following a meeting with his officers, Rwehururu decided to move his battalion away from the frontlines to its headquarters in Sanje.

=== Casualties ===
According to journalists Tony Avirgan and Martha Honey, three soldiers from Boma's battalion were killed in the attack, while several dozen were wounded. A Ugandan tank and three OT-64 SKOT armoured personnel carriers were destroyed. The hasty Ugandan retreat left large caches of weapons and ammunition abandoned; the Tanzanians seized a tank, three 160 mm mortars, and three 120 mm mortars. (Note: The Tanzanian state-owned newspaper, Daily News, stated that two tanks, six armoured personnel carriers, three Land Rovers, and several jeeps and lorries were captured.) Rwehururu stated that 14 Ugandan soldiers were killed, while his artillery officer was wounded and two sergeants were taken captive. (Note: The Daily News reported that "Mutukula was littered with the dead bodies of [Ugandan] soldiers.") Despite this defeat, the Ugandans subsequently claimed to have killed "hundreds" of Tanzanians at Mutukula. (Note: Rwehururu wrote that his men had inflicted "hundreds" of casualties on the Tanzanians, and that "their bodies littered the Mutukula Prison grounds". He wrote that furthermore, "intercepted messages revealed that they needed at least 10 lorries to transport the dead and the wounded".) The claim of high Tanzanian losses was described as unrealistic by historian Charles G. Thomas who argued that the Tanzanians likely lost "a handful" dead and "several dozen" wounded.

== Aftermath ==
According to Rwehururu, at around 16:00 on 22 January, a helicopter carrying Brigadier Taban Lupayi and Lieutenant Colonel Godwin Sule touched down in Sanje. The two Ugandan commanders informed Rwehururu that the reinforcements Amin had promised him were coming from Lukaya, 120 kilometres (75 mi) north of Mutukula. The men of the Suicide Battalion were furious, and Lupayi and Sule quickly left. The First Infantry Brigade reached Sanje in the evening, but Rwehururu withdrew his battalion to its barracks in Masaka. The Gondo Battalion also withdrew to Masaka, while Bananuka was arrested for apparently ordering a retreat against higher instruction. Amin later released him. Demoralised by their defeat, elements of the Gondo Battalion fled from the frontline all the way back to their base at Moroto. Other Ugandan forces retreated to the hills around Kakuuto. Ugandan planes conducted sporadic, ineffectual attacks against Tanzanian forces along the border.

After capturing Mutukula, the Tanzanians razed the town in revenge for the destruction wrought by the Uganda Army in Kagera. Bulldozers demolished homes, while soldiers shot elderly civilians who had been unable to flee. Nyerere was pleased by news of Mutukula's capture, but was horrified at his commanders' boastful reports of its destruction. He immediately ordered the TPDF to refrain from harming civilian lives and property from that point forward. As of 1998, the border signpost at Mutukula remained riddled with bullet holes from the battle. Tanzanian Prime Minister Edward Sokoine toured Mutukula on 23 January 1979.

Later, Radio Uganda reported that Amin sent a message to the United Nations Secretary-General, stating that Tanzanian troops had occupied Mutukula and area three miles beyond the border and requesting that the UN Security Council intervene and call for a Tanzanian withdrawal. The Tanzanian government first admitted to Mutukula's capture in the 26 January edition of the state-owned newspaper, the Daily News. The paper reported that the attack had been made following a Ugandan artillery attack, and printed pictures of celebratory TPDF soldiers and the Minister of Defence, Rashidi Kawawa, posing with seized armoured vehicles.

=== Course of the war ===
Nyerere did not initially intend on expanding the war beyond defending Tanzanian territory. After Amin failed to renounce his claims to Kagera and the Organisation of African Unity offered only limited criticism of the Ugandan invasion, he decided that Tanzanian forces should occupy southern Uganda. War correspondent Al J Venter argued that the Battle of Mutukula was the "first decisive Tanzanian blow" in the war, precipitating the later TPDF victories in Uganda.

The Tanzanians constructed an air strip in Mutukula so transport aircraft could resupply the troops at the front lines. Much of the military equipment captured at Mutukula was directly pressed into service by the TPDF and played a role in subsequent fighting. In February the TPDF was ordered to capture Masaka and Mbarara. Both towns were subsequently seized by Tanzanian and Ugandan rebel forces and destroyed with explosives. (Note: Political scientist Daniel Acheson-Brown wrote that this "seems to be a contradiction of Nyerere's earlier order not to destroy civilian areas.") Shortly thereafter Ugandan MiG-21s attempted to bomb the Mutukula air strip, but were repulsed by anti-aircraft missiles. Nyerere originally planned to halt his forces in Masaka and Mbarara and allow the Ugandan rebels to attack Kampala and overthrow Amin, as he feared that scenes of Tanzanian troops occupying the city would reflect poorly on his country's image abroad. However, Ugandan rebel forces did not have the strength to defeat the Libyan units coming to Amin's aid, so Nyerere decided to use the TPDF to take Kampala. The city fell on 11 April. The TPDF withdrew from Uganda in 1981.
