= Godwin Sule =

Sudanese-Ugandan military officer

- Born: Southern Sudan
- Died: 11 March 1979; Near Lukaya, Uganda
- Military career
- Allegiance: Anyanya; Uganda
- Branch: Uganda Army
- Service years: ? – 1979
- Rank: Lieutenant Colonel (Note: Most sources state that Sule was still a lieutenant colonel at the time of his death, but researcher Thomas Lowman described him as "general".)
- Commands: Malire Battalion; Uganda Army Air Force; Paratroopers Military School
- Conflicts: First Sudanese Civil War; Uganda–Tanzania War; Battle of Lukaya

Godwin Sule (died 11 March 1979) was a high-ranking Sudanese-born Ugandan military officer who held important commands in the Uganda Army during the dictatorship of President Idi Amin. A native of southern Sudan, he fought as a rebel in the First Sudanese Civil War before migrating to Uganda. There he rose to command the Malire Battalion and later the Paratroopers Military School. Regarded as one of the most talented soldiers and commanders in the Uganda Army during Amin's rule, Sule was tasked with leading the last major Ugandan counter-offensive during the Uganda–Tanzania War of 1978–79. This operation culminated in the Battle of Lukaya of 10–11 March 1979, during which Sule was killed under unclear and disputed circumstances. His death resulted in the collapse of the Ugandan offensive, contributing to the eventual overthrow of Amin's regime.

== Biography ==
=== Rebel activity and rise in the Uganda Army ===
Sule originated from southern Sudan. He was Christian as well as an ethnic Sudanese-Nubian and/or Kakwa. At some point, he joined the Anyanya rebels to fight against the Sudanese government in the First Sudanese Civil War. Sule eventually fled Sudan, and moved to Uganda, where he joined the Uganda Army, and rose in the ranks. His case was not uncommon, as many Sudanese rebels opted to join the Uganda Army instead of laying down their weapons in Sudan. President Amin regarded the ex-Anyanya troops as loyal to his government and therefore useful, although they factually acted as mercenaries.

In January 1974, Sule was promoted from major to lieutenant colonel and appointed commander of the Uganda Army's Malire Battalion. In that year, he and Air Force quartermaster Zeddy Maruru were sent to Europe by President Amin to assess the state of Uganda's embassies and the living situation of Ugandan exchange students. While there, the two heard stories of how Prince Mutebi had fought off an assassin who had attacked another student. Upon returning to Uganda, the two recommended that Amin recruit the prince into the Uganda Army, as they were impressed by his bravery.

In 1976 Sule served as commander of Entebbe Air Base and acting commander of the Uganda Army Air Force. He was not present at the facility during Operation Entebbe—a nighttime Israeli attack which destroyed a significant portion of the Uganda Army Air Force—having left early to meet a female companion at Lake Victoria Hotel. Uganda Army Chief of Staff Mustafa Adrisi reportedly wanted to incarcerate or execute Sule for his lapse in responsibility, but his closeness to Amin guaranteed his safety. From at least 1977 to his eventual death in combat, he headed the Paratroopers Military School in Uganda's capital Kampala.

=== Uganda–Tanzania War ===
In late 1978, the Uganda–Tanzania War broke out under unclear circumstances. After an initial Ugandan invasion of Tanzanian territory was defeated, the Tanzania People's Defence Force (TPDF) launched a counter-invasion and overran the border town of Mutukula on 21–22 January 1979. Although the garrison had been promised immediate reinforcements, these never arrived. Shortly after the battle, Sule and Brigadier Taban Lupayi arrived with a helicopter at nearby Sanje, to where the Mutukula garrison had retreated. They informed the local commander, Bernard Rwehururu, that the reinforcements had halted in Lukaya, 120 kilometres (75 mi) to the north. This information was received badly by the local troops; Sule sensed that the soldiers could possibly revolt and instructed Lupayi to order the reinforcements to advance so that they could relieve Rwehururu's men. Regardless, the troops remained restive. A warrant officer informed Lupayi that some angry infantrymen might be tempted to shoot the officers, causing Sule and Lupayi to quickly leave in their helicopter. In the next months, the Uganda Army was repeatedly defeated by the TPDF and allied Ugandan rebels.

In an attempt to reverse the Tanzanian victories, Amin placed Sule in charge of a large-scale counter-offensive that included Ugandan units as well as allied Libyan and Palestine Liberation Organisation forces. At the time, Sule was regarded as one of the Uganda Army's most competent commanders. While most foreign-born soldiers in the Uganda Army proved to be unreliable and unmotivated during the conflict, Sule was genuinely interested in driving the TPDF from Uganda. He emphasized mobile assaults instead of the previous defensive tactics of the Uganda Army, and personally led the operation. The initial offensive of the Ugandan-Libyan-Palestinian force targeted Lukaya, overwhelming the Tanzanian defenders and retaking the town on 10 March 1979. On the next day, the Tanzanian-led forces launched a counter-attack, surprising the Ugandan-led troops and driving them back. Sule attempted to rally his troops, assuming command of several tanks and driving toward the frontline. He was subsequently killed amid the fighting. His death prompted the collapse of the Ugandan command structure, and the remaining Ugandan troops abandoned their positions and fled, allowing the Tanzanians to secure the town.

The circumstances surrounding Sule's death remain unclear. Lieutenant Colonel Rwehururu overheard conflicting radio reports that Sule had either been killed by enemy fire or had been crushed by one of his tanks. When Rwehururu asked for clarification, he was told that he should focus on his own affairs, and the radio in Lukaya was subsequently turned off. When another Ugandan commander at Lukaya, Abdu Kisuule, could not determine Sule's whereabouts, he asked Amin to instruct soldiers to look for his corpse among the bodies brought back to Kampala. Amin later told him that Sule was found among them, his face crushed. Amin's son, Jaffar Rembo, claimed that Sule was shot from behind in a "so-called 'friendly fire' " incident. According to journalist Faustin Mugabe, other "insiders" have said that his death was "treacherous". Lieutenant Muzamir Amule dismissed these claims and supported the assertion that Sule was crushed by one of his tanks, and that this was not understood until the day after the battle. He stated that the commander had been directing tank fire at the Tanzanian positions when it was still dark, resulting in his accidental death when a tank reversed to circumnavigate a ditch. In contrast, researcher Richard J. Reid stated that Sule was "apparently killed by his own mutinous troops".

Sule's death had a detrimental impact on the Uganda Army which disintegrated after the Battle of Lukaya. Amin was overthrown when Tanzanian-led forces captured Kampala in April 1979.
