= South Asia Foundation =

Organization promoting regional cooperation among 8 countries

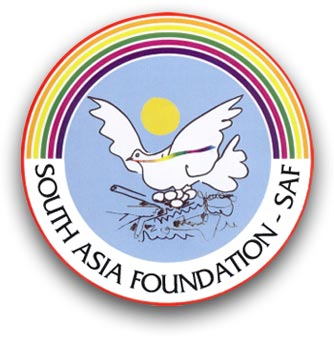
South Asia Foundation

South Asia Foundation (SAF) was founded by UNESCO Goodwill Ambassador Madanjeet Singh in 2000. The South Asia Foundation (SAF) is a secular, non-profit and non-political international organization, comprising eight autonomous chapters: Afghanistan, Bangladesh, Bhutan, India, Maldives, Nepal, Pakistan and Sri Lanka.

SAF's core objective is to promote regional cooperation through many UNESCO Madanjeet Singh Institutions of Excellence or International Institutions in the eight SAARC countries, offering the following international courses:

- UNESCO Madanjeet Singh Centre for Preservation of Afghanistan's Cultural Heritage (UMCPACH)
- UNESCO Madanjeet Singh South Asian Institute of Advanced Legal and Human Rights Studies (UMSAILS) Dhaka, Bangladesh
- UNESCO Madanjeet Singh Centre for South Asia Forestry Studies (UMCSAFS), Bumthang, Bhutan The UNESCO Madanjeet Center for South Asia Forestry Studies (UMCSAFS) at Ugyen Wangchuck Institute for Conservation and Environment (UWICE), Bumthang, Bhutan is pleased to announce the Madanjeet Singh scholarship for four years bachelor's degree program in Forestry to be undertaken at College of Natural Resources (CNR), Royal University of Bhutan (RUB) in Lobesa, Punakha, Bhutan from July 2015 to July 2019. The selected candidates each from SAARC countries are encouraged to apply for the program in their respective SAARC Country chapter
- UNESCO Madanjeet Singh Centre of South Asian Journalism (UMCSAJ) Chennai, India Details of the ACJ's academic course and activities can be accessed at its web site: Asian College of Journalism. Applications for the SAF Madanjeet Singh group scholarship at ACJ should go through the secretary of the board of your respective country and get the approval of the chairperson.In an innovative move designed to promote regional cooperation, the South Asia Foundation (SAF) has instituted 8 full scholarships for young people (women and men) from the eight SAARC countries to study at the UNESCO Madanjeet Singh Centre of South Asian Journalism (UMCSAJ), Chennai.
- UNESCO Madanjeet Singh Institute of Kashmir Studies (UMIKS), Srinagar, India. Total Number of scholars benefited so far 43. The course is discontinued from 2016
- UNESCO Madanjeet Singh Institute for South Asia Regional Cooperation (UMISARC), Puducherry, Pondicherry University, India The UMISARC promotes interaction among SAARC students and offers diploma and degree in South Asian Studies, arts and cultures. Since 2024 this centre is non functional and the course is
- UNESCO Madanjeet Singh School of Green Energy Technology (UMSGET) Green Energy Technology (Pondicherry),
- Climate Research (Maldives), Development Studies (Kathmandu),
- Visual Arts (Lahore),
- Water Management (Moratuwa, Sri Lanka).

== SAF Alumni Meet in Nepal ==
4-6 December 2024, the Alumni meet brought together around 300 scholars and professionals from across the region. The three-day event, held from December 4 to 6, underscored the importance of fostering regional cooperation and the pivotal role of Bangladesh in advancing South Asian unity and collaboration.

Since the 26 October 2010, Mme Irina Bokova, UNESCO Director-General announced that the 12 SAF Institutions of Excellence will be able to use UNESCO logo and named UNESCO Madanjeet Singh Institutions of Excellence.

South Asia Foundation
- Established: year 2000.
- Founder: Madanjeet Singh
- Type: Apex Body of SAARC
- Headquarters: 33-A, Vasant Vihar; New Delhi
- Website: www.southasiafoundation.org

SAF has been admitted into official relationship with the United Nations Educational, Scientific and Cultural Organization (UNESCO). It is an apex body of South Asian Association for Regional Cooperation. The organization's objective is to "uphold its core values of regional cooperation and peace through education and cultural interaction between the eight SAARC countries."
