= Bernard Rwehururu =

Ugandan military officer (1941–2015)

- Born: c. 1941; Ruhoko, Ntungamo District, Protectorate of Uganda
- Died: 26 February 2015 (aged 73–74); Jinja, Uganda
- Spouse: Rosemary Rwehururu (m. 1969)
- Military career
- Allegiance: Uganda
- Branch: Uganda Army (1965–1980); Former Uganda National Army (1980–?); Uganda National Liberation Army (1985–1986); National Resistance Army (1986–1995); Uganda People's Defence Force (1995–2013)
- Service years: 1965–2013
- Rank: Brigadier
- Service number: RO-03284
- Commands: Suicide Battalion; Kabamba Military Academy
- Conflicts: Uganda–Tanzania War; Battle of Mutukula; Battle of Masaka; Western Uganda campaign of 1979; Ugandan Bush War

Bernard Rwehururu (c. 1941 – 26 February 2015) was a Ugandan military officer and author. He served in various Ugandan militaries from 1965 until 2013, including under the governments of Milton Obote, Idi Amin, Tito Okello, and Yoweri Museveni.

After initially studying to become a Catholic priest, Rwehururu became a soldier to financially support his family. In the Uganda–Tanzania War of 1978–79, he rose to command a Uganda Army battalion and fought in several battles. Alongside other remnants of the Ugandan military, he retreated into exile in 1979 and subsequently became part of a rebel group attempting to overthrow the government in Uganda. In 1985, the new Ugandan government was overthrown by its own military; Rwehururu subsequently returned from exile and joined the Uganda National Liberation Army (UNLA). In the following year, the UNLA-backed regime was also overthrown, whereupon Rwehururu became part of the National Resistance Army (NRA). He rose through the ranks of the NRA and its successor, the Uganda People's Defence Force (UPDF), over the next decades. In 2002, he authored an autobiography, titled Cross to the Gun, which detailed his experience in the various Ugandan militaries, particularly the 1971–79 period.

== Biography ==
=== Early life ===
Bernard Rwehururu was born to Nathan Kyamwonyo around 1941 in Ruhoko, Rugarama Sub-county, Ntungamo District. His parents were Protestant Christians, but he defied them to convert to Catholicism when he was 15. Initially, Rwehururu wanted to become a priest and began studying for the priesthood.

After completing secondary school at Kitabi Minor Seminary in Bushenyi District, Rwehururu realized that he had to earn money to pay the school fees for his brothers and sisters. If he continued his education to become a priest, he would only be able to make any money after seven years; as a result, he abandoned his studies and enlisted as an officer cadet in the Uganda Army (UA) in 1965. At first, he attended a four-month training course in Jinja. One of his teachers during this period was David Oyite-Ojok. After completing the course at Jinja, he was sent on a training mission in India. He graduated from the Indian Military Academy. Upon returning to Uganda, he served at Moroto Town.

=== Service under Idi Amin ===
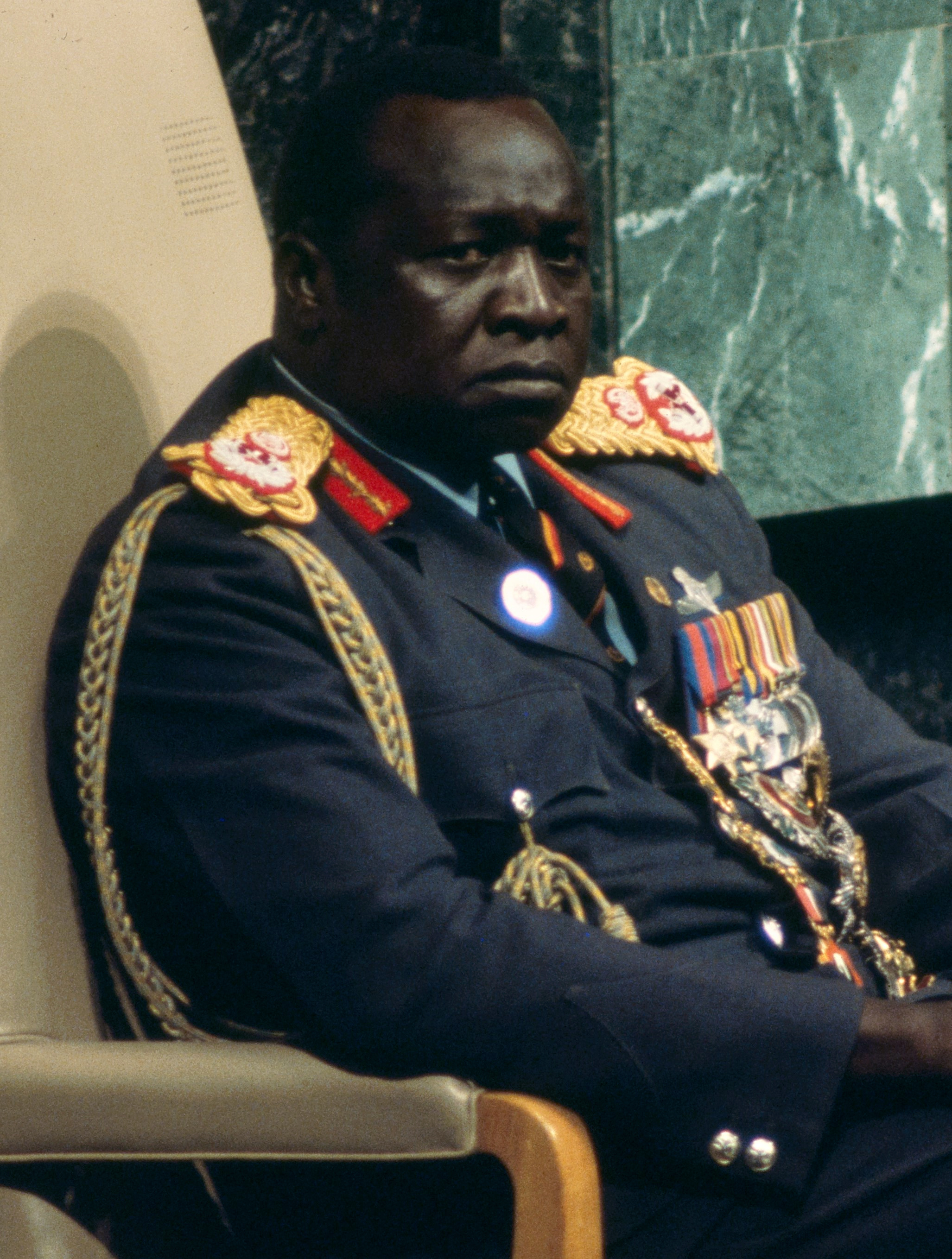
From 1971, Rwehururu served under President Idi Amin (pictured 1975)

In 1971, parts of the military overthrew Ugandan President Milton Obote in a coup d'état. Idi Amin subsequently assumed the presidency and established a military dictatorship. Rwehururu continued to serve under the new regime. He was eventually appointed head of a military tribunal against economic sabotage in Busoga and the eastern provinces. Regarding the crimes committed by Amin's government and why he had continued to support this regime, Rwehururu maintained that a military officer "should do [their] part" and not be "swayed by the wind that is blowing"; instead, officers should try to improve the situation from within the system. He also argued that he himself was a victim of Amin's regime, referencing an incident when he was almost sentenced to death during Amin's rule.

By 1973, Rwehururu was a Company Sergeant Major, and took part in military exercises at the border of a neighboring state, Tanzania. In October 1978, the Uganda Army launched an invasion of Tanzania under disputed circumstances, resulting in open war. A few weeks later, Rwehururu was called by Lieutenant Colonel Tom Asiki in Masaka; he was ordered to oversee the "guarding and patrolling the border as well as training the recruits" in the border town of Mutukula. This effectively placed him in command of the Suicide Battalion. Rwehururu was among the small number of military officers of non-West Nile origin who stayed loyal to Amin's government during the Uganda–Tanzania War. He was regarded as one of the most competent Ugandan commanders during the war, with then-rebel leader and later Ugandan President Yoweri Museveni describing Rwehururu as one of the Uganda Army officers who gave the Tanzanians and their rebel allies a "lot of trouble".

Map of the battles of the Uganda–Tanzania War

By December 1978, the Tanzania People's Defence Force (TPDF) had repelled the initial Ugandan invasion and was preparing a counter-invasion. By this point, the border had become the frontline. Rwehururu attempted to improve the defenses along the border to prepare for the upcoming Tanzanian operation. He was frustrated by his superior officers such as UA chief of staff Yusuf Gowon who did not take his warnings and planning seriously. In addition, the TPDF subjected the Ugandan troops at the border to heavy artillery fire; Rwehururu "pleaded" for weaponry to counter these attacks, but the Ugandan high command never acted upon these requests. On 21 January 1979, the Tanzanians launched a cross-border attack on Mutukula, where Rwehururu's battalion was stationed. After some fighting, Mutukula was overrun by the Tanzanians, whereupon Rwehururu relocated his headquarters to Sanje.

On 22 January, a helicopter carrying Brigadier Taban Lupayi and Lieutenant Colonel Godwin Sule reached Sanje; the officers informed Rwehururu that the reinforcements which had been promised to him were coming from Lukaya, 120 kilometres (75 mi) north of Mutukula. The men of the Suicide Battalion were furious, and Lupayi and Sule quickly left. Rwehururu subsequently withdrew his battalion to its barracks in Masaka. There, he and other officers set up new defensive positions, expecting a Tanzanian attack. The Battle of Masaka began on 23 February 1979. Many of the Ugandan defenders quickly melted away, leaving the Suicide Battalion to defend the city alone. The TPDF stormed Masaka on the next day, and what remained of the Ugandan garrison was routed; Rwehururu later argued that he "lost control" of the situation. There were also accounts that the Suicide Battalion mutinied during the battle. The unit rallied outside Masaka, and then retreated to the north.

In his autobiography, Rwehururu claimed that he and the Suicide Battalion were later involved in the Battle of Sembabule from March to April 1979, a claim endorsed by his family members, the Daily Monitor, Museveni, and Tanzanian commander Steven Isaac Mtemihonda, a veteran of the battle. However, journalists Tony Avirgan and Martha Honey –who accompanied Tanzanian troops during the war– stated that the Ugandan Tiger Regiment, not the Suicide Battalion, had fought at Sembabule. Journalist Joshua Kato also claimed that the Suicide Battalion was involved in the Battle of Lukaya during March 1979.

On 11 April, Uganda's capital of Kampala fell to the Tanzanians and their rebel allies; Amin subsequently fled into exile. Unlike most of the Uganda Army soldiers, Rwehururu and his troops did not surrender or flee upon hearing of this. He opted to keep fighting, later stating that he "was not defending [Amin's] government. I was defending Uganda from invasion." (Note: This account was disputed by Kasirye Gwanga, a staff sergeant in the Uganda Army during the war. According to him, "Rwehururu and other officers ran from the frontline". Gwanga claimed that he and his comrades eventually encountered Rwehururu in Kampala where he had "already disguis[ed] himself as a businessman" and denied ever being a soldier.) Alongside the Suicide Battalion and other Uganda Army contingents, he retreated to the western city of Masindi. When the Uganda Army troops in Masindi heard that the TPDF had also captured Hoima, most of them panicked and fled for Kigumba. Believing that he had to delay the Tanzanian advance to ensure a more orderly retreat of the UA troops, Rwehururu rallied the Suicide Battalion and set up an ambush on the Masindi-Hoima Road. For this plan, he placed his troops at Bulindi and successfully ambushed the TPDF forces. After this delaying action, he and his remaining troops fled into exile.

=== Later military career ===
Rwehururu first moved to Sudan before relocating to Zaire (present-day Democratic Republic of the Congo). In 1980, the remnants of the exiled Uganda Army invaded the West Nile District in an attempt to topple the new Ugandan government, starting the Ugandan Bush War. Rwehururu was among these forces, but the ex-Uganda Army troops were never able to substantially expand their operations beyond West Nile District. When the ex-UA troops split into rival factions, he became part of the Former Uganda National Army (FUNA). For a time, he was even considered a potential leader of FUNA. Rwehururu ultimately settled as a refugee in Zaire. In 1982, his wife Rosemary attempted to visit him; she was almost raped by Zairian soldiers during her journey. Rwehururu later commented that he could not "stop admiring his wife for her love and courage".

In 1985, the government of Milton Obote's second presidency was overthrown by its own armed forces, the Uganda National Liberation Army (UNLA). Rwehururu subsequently returned from exile, and joined the UNLA under the new President Tito Okello. However, Okello's regime was toppled by Museveni's National Resistance Army (NRA) in 1986, whereupon Rwehururu defected to the NRA. He served in various positions in the NRA and its successor organization, Uganda People's Defence Force (UPDF), including Defence Attaché at the Uganda High Commission in Nairobi, Kenya. He was eventually appointed Commandant of the Uganda Military Academy in Kabamba, the "most respected infantry training schools" in Uganda. In 2002, he published an autobiography, titled Cross to the Gun, in which he detailed his experiences during Amin's rule and, according to the Daily Monitor, attempted to "decipher what went wrong with the country's political and military class". From July 2009 to 2011, he served as the chairman of the General Court Martial in Makindye. His last military post was chief advisor to UPDF commander Aronda Nyakairima.

=== Retirement and death ===
Rwehururu retired from the military with the rank of brigadier in November 2013. He had long suffered from hypertension and diabetes, and these ailments worsened in his last years. On 26 February 2015, he died of heart and diabetic complications in his home in Jinja. He was buried in his birthplace of Ruhoko. He was survived by his wife Rosemary and eight children. His eldest son, Paul, had died three months before him.

After his death, Rwehururu was lauded by UPDF spokesperson Paddy Ankunda as someone "who spoke his mind". Ankunda also highlighted the importance of his book Cross to the Gun as detailing Uganda's historical development. UPDF commander Katumba Wamala praised Rwehururu as "a knowledgeable, humourous [sic] and smart officer".

== Personal life ==
Rwehururu married his wife Rosemary in 1969; the two were temporarily separated from 1979 into the 1980s due to his exile.

None of Rwehururu's children opted to join the military, a decision he respected. By 2009, two of his sons were "doing private work", one worked as a physician, one studied in Egypt, and one was a Catholic priest in Europe. In his later life, he also reconciled with his parents over his conversion to Catholicism.
