= Battle of Lukaya =

1979 battle of the Uganda–Tanzania War

Coordinates: 0.150833°S 31.874444°E

- Part of the Uganda–Tanzania War
- Libyan and Tanzanian troop movements during and after the battle
| Date | 10–11 March 1979 |
| Location | Lukaya and surrounding area, Uganda |
| Result | Tanzanian–Ugandan rebel victory |
| Territorial changes | Lukaya occupied by Tanzanian forces |

Belligerents
| Tanzania; Ugandan rebels | Uganda; Libya; Palestine Liberation Organisation |

Commanders and leaders
| (Tanzania) David Musuguri (Tanzania) Imran Kombe (Tanzania) Mwita Marwa; David Oyite-Ojok | (Second Republic of Uganda) Godwin Sule † (Second Republic of Uganda) Isaac Maliyamungu (Second Republic of Uganda) Yusuf Gowon (Second Republic of Uganda) Abdu Kisuule (Palestine) Mutlaq Hamdan (WIA) (Palestine) Wassef Erekat (WIA) |

Units involved
| (Tanzania) 201st Brigade (Tanzania) 208th Brigade (Uganda) Kikosi Maalum | (Second Republic of Uganda) Uganda Army; Artillery & Signals Regiment; Chui Regiment; Suicide Battalion (disputed); (History of Libya under Muammar Gaddafi) Libyan Armed Forces; Regular Army elements; Pan-African Legion; People's Militia; (Palestine) Fatah |

Strength
| 2 Tanzanian brigades 1 Ugandan rebel battalion (7,000 total soldiers); 3 tanks | 2,000 Ugandan soldiers (Tanzanian estimate); ~1,000 Libyan soldiers Several Palestinian guerrillas 18 tanks 12+ armoured personnel carriers |

Casualties and losses
| 8 Tanzanian soldiers killed 1 Ugandan rebel killed | ~200 Ugandan soldiers killed ~200 Libyan soldiers killed 1 Palestinian killed, 8 wounded (PLO claim); 1 Libyan soldier captured |

The Battle of Lukaya (Kiswahili: Mapigano ya Lukaya) was a battle of the Uganda–Tanzania War. It was fought on 10 and 11 March 1979 around Lukaya, Uganda, between Tanzanian forces (supported by Ugandan rebels) and Ugandan government forces (supported by Libyan and Palestinian troops). After briefly occupying the town, Tanzanian troops and Ugandan rebels retreated under artillery fire. The Tanzanians subsequently launched a counterattack, retaking Lukaya and killing hundreds of Libyans and Ugandans.

President Idi Amin of Uganda had attempted to invade neighbouring Tanzania to the south in 1978. The attack was repulsed, and Tanzania launched a counterattack into Ugandan territory. In February 1979, the Tanzania People's Defence Force (TPDF) seized Masaka. The TPDF's 201st Brigade was then instructed to secure Lukaya and its causeway to the north, which served as the only direct route through a large swamp to Kampala, the Ugandan capital. Meanwhile, Amin ordered his forces to recapture Masaka, and a force was assembled for the purpose consisting of Ugandan troops, allied Libyan soldiers, and a handful of Palestine Liberation Organisation guerrillas, led by Lieutenant Colonel Godwin Sule.

On the morning of 10 March, the TPDF's 201st Brigade under Brigadier Imran Kombe, bolstered by a battalion of Ugandan rebels, occupied Lukaya without incident. In the late afternoon the Libyans attacked the town with rockets, and the unit broke and fled into the nearby swamp. Tanzanian commanders ordered the 208th Brigade to march to the Kampala road to flank the Ugandan-Libyan force. At dawn on 11 March the 208th Brigade reached its target position and the Tanzanian counterattack began. The regrouped 201st Brigade assaulted the Libyans and Ugandans from the front and the 208th from their rear. Sule was killed, precipitating the collapse of the Ugandan defences, while the Libyans retreated. Hundreds of Ugandan government and Libyan troops were killed. The Battle of Lukaya was the largest engagement of the war. Amin's forces were adversely affected by the outcome, and Ugandan resistance crumbled in its wake. The TPDF was able to proceed up the road and later attack Kampala.

== Background ==
In 1971, Colonel Idi Amin launched a military coup that overthrew the President of Uganda, Milton Obote, precipitating a deterioration of relations with neighbouring Tanzania. Tanzanian President Julius Nyerere had close ties with Obote and had supported his socialist orientation. Amin installed himself as President of Uganda and ruled the country under a repressive dictatorship. Nyerere withheld diplomatic recognition of the new government and offered asylum to Obote and his supporters. He tacitly supported a failed attempt by Obote to overthrow Amin in 1972, and after a brief border conflict he and Amin signed a peace accord. Nevertheless, relations between the two presidents remained tense, and Amin made repeated threats to invade Tanzania.

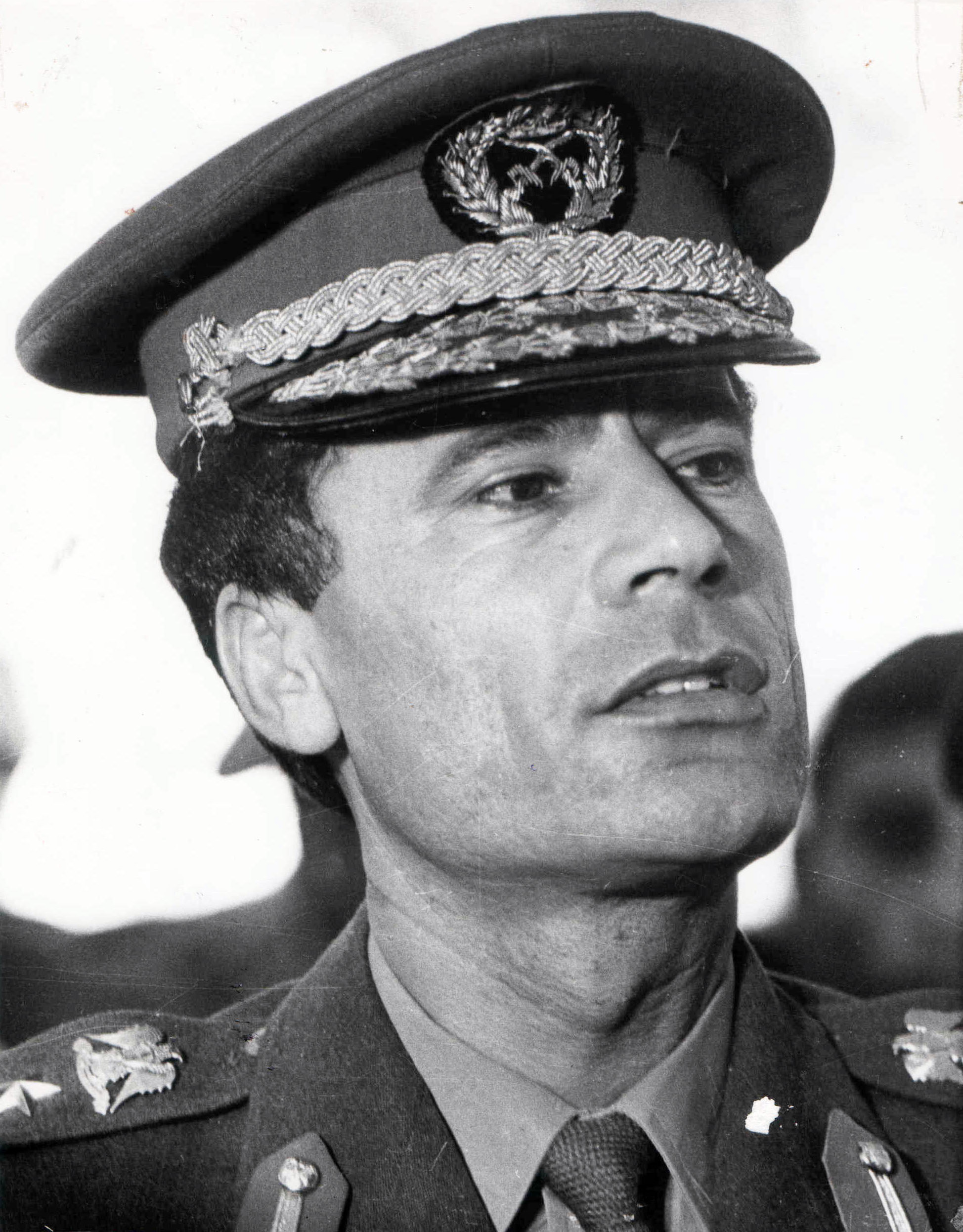
Libyan leader Muammar Gaddafi (pictured) aided Idi Amin's regime during the Uganda–Tanzania War.

Uganda's economy languished under Amin's corrupt rule, and instability manifested in the armed forces. Following a failed mutiny in late October 1978, Ugandan troops crossed over the Tanzanian border in pursuit of rebellious soldiers. On 1 November Amin announced that he was annexing the Kagera Salient in northern Tanzania. Tanzania halted the sudden invasion, mobilised anti-Amin opposition groups, and launched a counteroffensive. Nyerere told foreign diplomats that he did not intend to depose Amin, but only "teach him a lesson". The claim was not believed; Nyerere despised Amin, and he made statements to some of his colleagues about overthrowing him. The Tanzanian Government also felt that the northern border would not be secure unless the threat presented by Amin was eliminated. After the Tanzania People's Defence Force (TPDF) retook northern Tanzania, Major General David Musuguri was appointed commander of the 20th Division and ordered to push into Ugandan territory. In-mid February, Libyan troops were flown into Entebbe to assist the Uganda Army. Libyan leader Muammar Gaddafi felt that Uganda, a Muslim state in his view, was being threatened by a Christian army, and wished to halt the Tanzanians.

On 24 February 1979, the TPDF seized Masaka. Nyerere originally planned to halt his forces there and allow Ugandan exiles to attack Kampala, the Ugandan capital, and overthrow Amin. He feared that scenes of Tanzanian troops occupying the city would reflect poorly on the country's image abroad. However, Ugandan rebel forces did not have the strength to defeat the incoming Libyan units, so Nyerere decided to use the TPDF to take the capital. The fall of Masaka surprised and troubled Ugandan commanders, who felt that the defeat made Kampala vulnerable to attack. They mobilised additional forces and began planning for a defence of the city. The Uganda Army also showed first signs of disintegrating, as various high-ranking commanders disappeared or were murdered. One Ugandan soldier stated in an interview with Drum, a South African magazine, that "the situation is worsening every day and therefore our days are numbered". Meanwhile, the TPDF's 20th Division prepared to advance from Masaka to Kampala.

== Prelude ==
The only road from Masaka to Kampala passed through Lukaya, a town 39 kilometres (24 mi) to the north of the former. From there, the route continued on a 25-kilometre (16 mi) causeway that went through a swamp until it reached Nabusanke. The swamp was impassable for vehicles, and the destruction of the causeway would delay a Tanzanian attack on Kampala for months. Though the TPDF would be vulnerable on the passage, Musuguri ordered his troops to secure it. The TPDF's 207th Brigade was dispatched through the swamp to the east, the 208th Brigade was sent west to conduct a wide sweep that would bring it around the northern end of the swamp, and the 201st Brigade under Brigadier Imran Kombe was to advance up the road directly into the town. The 201st consisted almost entirely of militiamen, many of whom had not seen combat. However, the unit was bolstered by a battalion of Ugandan rebels, led by Lieutenant Colonel David Oyite-Ojok.

A plan to destroy the causeway was presented to Amin in Kampala, but he rejected it, saying that it would inhibit his army's ability to launch a counteroffensive against the Tanzanians. He also believed that with Libyan support the TPDF would soon be defeated, and thus destroying and then rebuilding the causeway later would be unnecessary. According to diplomats, Amin initially planned to make a defensive "last stand" at Mpigi, a town located south of Kampala and north of Lukaya. On 2–4 March, the Uganda Army defeated a rebel attack during the Battle of Tororo, heartening Amin. Along with his commanders' urgings, the victory at Tororo persuaded the President to order a counteroffensive. On 9 March over a thousand Libyan troops and about 40 Palestine Liberation Organisation (PLO) guerrillas belonging to Fatah were flown into Uganda. They reinforced the about 400 PLO militants who were already in the country. The Libyan force included regular units, sections of the People's Militia, and members of the Pan-African Legion. They were accompanied by 15 T-55 tanks, over a dozen armoured personnel carriers, multiple Land Rovers equipped with 106 mm (4.2 in) recoilless rifles, one dozen BM-21 Grad 12-barrel Katyusha rocket launcher variants, and other large artillery pieces, such as 122 mm mortars and two batteries of D-30 howitzers. The PLO forces were commanded by Colonel Mutlaq Hamdan (alias "Abu Fawaz"), Major Wassef Erekat, Captain Juma Hassan Hamdallah, and Captain Ibrahim Awad.

Amin ordered the Libyans, together with some Ugandan troops (Note: The Tanzanian state-run paper, News, later estimated that 2,000 Ugandan troops participated in the action. The Lebanese Al Akhbar newspaper, having interviewed PLO veterans of the war, stated that five Ugandan battalions fought in the battle.)—including the Artillery & Signals Regiment, the Chui Regiment, and possibly the Suicide Battalion (Note: There exist conflicting accounts in regard to the Suicide Battalion's activities in March 1979. According to journalist Joshua Kato, the unit fought at Katonga Bridge during the Battle of Lukaya. In contrast, the Suicide Battalion's commander Bernard Rwehururu maintained that his unit was involved in the Battle of Sembabule at the time. Journalists Tony Avirgan and Martha Honey have instead stated that the Ugandan force at Sembabule consisted of the Tiger Regiment.)—and PLO fighters, to recapture Masaka, and a force assembled for the purpose at the northern edge of the swamp between Lukaya and Buganga. (Note: Tanzanian Lieutenant Colonel Ben Msuya reported that 2,500 Uganda Army troops encamped at Bukulula, a location north of Masaka, in preparation for the operation, and that his troops dislodged them over the course of three days, culminating in the seizure of Lukaya.) The Libyan and PLO commanders drew up plans for a counteroffensive in great secrecy due to fears that the Uganda Army included illoyal elements. With the exception of Amin, the Ugandan military leadership was informed of the battle plans only just before the operation began. Lieutenant Colonel Godwin Sule, an Ugandan paratrooper commander, was placed in charge of the operation. The PLO fighters were integrated into the Ugandan units, with Colonel Hamdan co-commanding tank and infantry forces, while Major Erekat assumed command of part of the artillery. The Libyan troops were briefed about the operation at Mitala Maria. Radio Uganda announced the counteroffensive's beginning at noon on 9 March, while the Ugandan forces present in Lukaya withdrew. (Note: According to Radio Uganda announcements, TPDF troops had already reached the outskirts of Mpigi on 8 March, but retreated when Ugandan artillery began shelling them on 9 March.)

== Battle ==
=== 10 March ===
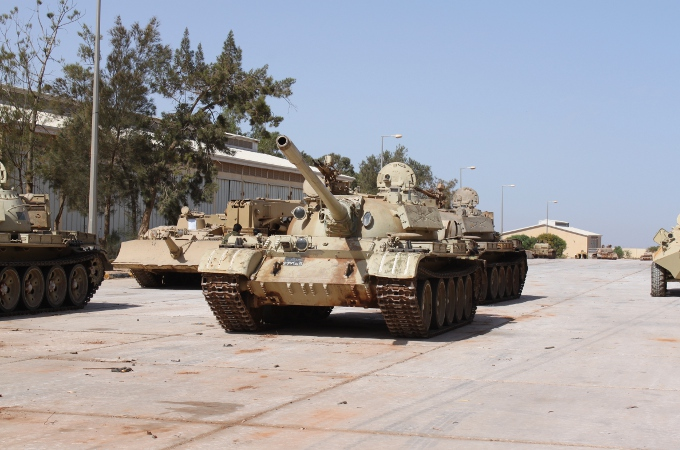
The Ugandans and Libyans used T-55 (example in Libyan service pictured) and M4A1 Sherman tanks during the Battle of Lukaya.

On the morning of 10 March the TPDF conducted a light bombardment of Lukaya, which had been deserted by the populace. The 201st Brigade then occupied the town to await crossing the causeway the next day, and they began to dig trenches as a precautionary measure. The Tanzanians and the Ugandans and Libyans were unaware of each other's positions. In the late afternoon, around three o'clock, the Ugandan-Libyan-Palestinian force began its advance toward Lukaya, with orders to take Masaka within three hours. Upon seeing the Tanzanians at dusk, they initiated a barrage with the Katyusha rockets. The artillery overshot them, but the mostly inexperienced Tanzanian soldiers were frightened, and many of them broke rank and fled. Though others remained at their defensive positions, they were nonetheless surprised and quickly forced to withdraw into the swamp along the Masaka road after seeing the Libyan T-55s and three Ugandan M4A1 Sherman tanks advancing toward them. Nobody was killed in the action. Despite its orders to recapture Masaka, the Ugandan-Libyan force stopped in Lukaya, fearing that the Tanzanians were trying to bait them into an ambush. (Note: According to journalist Baldwin Mzirai, the international media was led to believe that the initial Tanzanian retreat from Lukaya was not a rout but a deliberate strategic action. Reuters reported on 11 March that Ugandan exiles in Nairobi stated that UNLF troops had conducted a "tactical retreat" from the town. Radio Uganda declared that the Uganda Army was conducting a successful counteroffensive.) The Libyans established defensive positions but did not dig any trenches. Instead, the troops were allowed to rest, while the commanders prepared for the next phase of the battle. Only three Tanzanian tanks guarded the road. Kombe and his subordinates tried to reassemble their brigade so it could continue fighting, but the soldiers were shaken and could not be organised.

Tanzanian commanders decided to alter their plans to prevent the loss of Lukaya from turning into a debacle. The 208th Brigade under Brigadier Mwita Marwa, which was 60 kilometres (37 mi) north-west of the town, was ordered to reverse course and as quickly as possible cut off the Ugandans and Libyans from Kampala. The tanks on the Masaka road were instructed to advance and open fire on the Ugandan and Libyan positions. Their drivers were hesitant to do so without infantry support, so Musuguri dispatched one of his officers to the area to ensure that the order was carried out. Volunteers were recruited from the 201st Brigade to infiltrate Lukaya through the swamp and gather intelligence. Overnight the situation was dominated by confusion; the Ugandan-Libyan-Palestinian force and the TPDF's 201st Brigade were disorganised, and troops from both sides moved around in the darkness (there was no moonlight) along the road and in the town, unable to differentiate between each other. In one incident, Oyite-Ojok was leading a band of Kikosi Maalum (KM) fighters down the road when they heard other persons talking in Swahili. Oyite-Ojok and his group assumed they were allies, but then one of them said in Luo—a language not spoken in Tanzania, "Just wait until morning and we'll crush these stupid Acholi". Oyite-Ojok instructed his men to open fire, but in the dark they were unable to verify if they had struck anybody. The Tanzanian patrols were largely unsuccessful in verifying the Ugandan-Libyan positions, so their tanks' fire was ineffective. Over the course of the night eight Tanzanian soldiers and one KM fighter were killed.

=== 11 March ===
The 208th Brigade reached its flanking position at the Kampala road at dawn on 11 March and began the counterattack. The regrouped 201st Brigade attacked from the front and the 208th from behind, thereby putting great pressure on the Ugandan-Libyan force. The Ugandan rebels under Oyite-Ojok aided the attack. (Note: Some Ugandan sources (such as military officer and politician Tito Okello) later claimed that Oyite-Ojok single-handedly turned the tide of the battle by rallying the Tanzanian-led forces, and spearheading the counter-attack against the pro-Amin forces.) Precisely aimed Tanzanian artillery devastated the ranks of the Ugandan-Libyan force, particularly the TPDF's own Katyusha rockets. The Ugandans and Libyans were surprised by the assault and could not muster an effective resistance, their coordination being further hampered by language barriers. Most of the Libyans subsequently began to retreat. The PLO militants and their associated Ugandan soldiers reacted better, and attempted to muster a defense. One group used a 7.5 cm anti-tank gun to fend off the leading Tanzanian tank, slightly damaging it and halting its advance for a short while. The majority of the PLO commanders, including Colonel Hamdan, Major Erekat, as well as Captain Ibrahim Awad were eventually wounded during the fighting. At his headquarters farther north, Ugandan Lieutenant Colonel Abdu Kisuule, commander of the Artillery & Signals Regiment, was awakened by the withdrawing Libyans. He ordered Major Aloysius Ndibowa to block the Kampala road to curtail the retreat. He then moved towards the front from Kayabwe, while Sule assumed command of several tanks and drove towards the battle. Near the Katonga Bridge, Tanzanian forces took up positions in a eucalyptus forest on the western side of the road. They ambushed the Ugandans and Libyans, inflicting heavy casualties. The fighting was bitter, and several tanks as well as APCs were destroyed in the area's groves and plantations. Dozens of jeeps evacuated the wounded to Kampala.

In an attempt to strengthen morale, Ugandan General Isaac Maliyamungu and Major General Yusuf Gowon joined their troops on the front line. For unknown reasons, the positions the two men took were frequently subject to sudden, intense rocket fire. Ugandan junior officers tried to convince their men that the Tanzanians were probably aware of the generals' presence and were targeting them with precise bombardments. The Ugandan troops nonetheless felt that Maliyamungu and Gowon were harbingers of misfortune and nicknamed them bisirani (English: bad omen). (Note: Amin's son, Jaffar Rembo, claimed that "it was alleged" that Maliyamungu and Gowon had been bribed to provide the TPDF with information on Ugandan positions so they could be struck with precise artillery fire.) Sule soon realised the generals were not having a positive effect and asked them to leave the front. Sule was later killed after being accidentally run over by one his tanks while ordering it to reverse course to manoeuvre around a crater created by a Tanzanian artillery shell. Kisuule had lost contact with him and was not aware of his fate until the next day. (Note: The circumstances surrounding Sule's death were not initially clear. Lieutenant Colonel Bernard Rwehururu, commander of the Suicide Battalion, overheard conflicting radio reports that Sule had either been killed by enemy fire or had been crushed by one of his tanks. When Rwehururu asked for clarification, he was told that he should focus on his own affairs, and the radio in Lukaya was subsequently turned off. When Kisuule could not determine Sule's whereabouts, he asked Amin to instruct soldiers to look for his corpse among the bodies brought back to Kampala. Amin later told him that Sule was found among them, his face crushed. Amin's son, Jaffar Rembo, claimed that Sule was shot from behind in a "so-called 'friendly fire' " incident. According to journalist Faustin Mugabe, other "insiders" have said that his death was "treacherous". Lieutenant Muzamir Amule dismissed their claims and supported the assertion that Sule was crushed by one of his tanks, and that this was not understood until the day after the battle. In contrast, researcher Richard J. Reid also stated that Sule was "apparently killed by his own mutinous troops".) His death prompted the collapse of the Ugandan command structure, and the remaining Ugandan troops abandoned their positions and fled.

== Aftermath ==
=== Casualties and losses ===
The Tanzanians later reported that 7,000 TPDF and Ugandan rebel soldiers participated in the battle. After the battle, Tanzanian forces counted over 400 dead soldiers in the area, including about 200 Libyans. More bodies were brought by retreating troops to Kampala. Kayabwe residents later recalled seeing many Libyan bodies strewn across the Kampala road north of Lukaya and along the Katonga Bridge. The Tanzanian soldiers were unwilling to take Libyan soldiers as prisoners, instead shooting those they found, as their political officers in the previous days had told them that the Arabs were coming into Sub-Saharan Africa to re-establish slavery; a single wounded lance corporal was captured. According to Palestinian sources, one PLO fighter was killed, and eight were wounded. Three planes evacuated wounded Libyans from Kampala to Tripoli. Hamdan, Erekat, and Awad were also evacuated and treated at a hospital in Athens. A large number of the surviving Ugandan soldiers were captured by the TPDF. Tanzanian casualties were light.

After the Lukaya engagement, Uganda Radio claimed that 500 Tanzanians were killed and 500 were wounded. Ugandan opposition exiles claimed that 600 Ugandan government soldiers and an unspecified number of Libyans were killed. The Africa Research Bulletin dismissed the statistics, writing, "none of these figures is credible". The Tanzanian government press claimed that two battalions of about 2,000 Ugandan soldiers were "annihilated". Three tanks were also reported destroyed. Independent diplomatic sources acknowledged that immediate details of the battle were unclear, but labeled the inflicted casualties claimed by both belligerents as greatly exaggerated. In a meeting with foreign diplomats on 15 March, Amin stated that his forces had suffered heavy losses, including the death of a lieutenant colonel and five captains. The Ugandan–Libyan force left many weapons behind, as well as a copy of their battle plan, which was seized by the Tanzanians. The document revealed that Amin's troops were to eventually push further past Masaka and drive the TPDF out of Kalisizo.

=== Strategic implications ===
Kisuule later said that Lukaya "was the last serious battle and that's where we lost the war". Indian diplomat Madanjeet Singh stated that "it was essentially the Battle of Lukaya that had shattered the morale of Amin's army". Idi Amin's son, Jaffar Remo Amin, said "The war ended at Lukaya when most of the soldiers and Secret Service personnel either said 'Congo na gawa' or 'Sudan na gawa' or high tailed it out of the country". The historians Tom Cooper and Adrien Fontanellaz concluded that "after the Battle of Lukaya, the Uganda Army de-facto collapsed and ran". Sule was one of the Uganda Army's most competent commanders, and his death had a detrimental impact on the force. After the engagement, many Ugandan commanders withdrew from the front lines. His situation becoming more desperate and his appeals to the United Nations, Arab League, and Organisation of African Unity having little effect, Amin requested that Pope John Paul II intervene and call for an end to the war. The Pope reportedly responded with a letter advising Amin to read passages from the Book of Ezekiel. Charles Njonjo, the Attorney General of Kenya, told journalists in an off-the-record meeting that the TPDF had suffered difficulties at Lukaya and were going to deal with continuous problems in the face of the Libyan intervention.

Map showing the locations of battles of the Uganda–Tanzania War; the Tanzanians' success at Lukaya and Sembabule allowed them to advance further into Uganda and attack Kampala.

The Tanzanians publicly announced that they had complete control over Lukaya. After the victory there and the eventual success at the Battle of Sembabule, the TPDF held the strategic initiative for the rest of the war. Despite the favourable outcome, Tanzanian commanders felt that the Battle of Lukaya had been waged disastrously; had the Ugandans and Libyans pushed beyond the town after occupying it, they could have retaken Masaka and driven the TPDF out of Uganda. On 13 March Tanzanian Junior Minister of Defence Moses Nnauye and Musuguri met with veterans of the engagement to find out more about what happened. Those who had retreated from the Libyans expressed that they were stressed and wanted to be given a month's leave from the front line. Nnauye told them the war was too important for this to be done, as it would be detrimental to the TPDF's operational capability. The 201st Brigade was subsequently reorganised so that its ranks were no longer dominated by militiamen.

=== Course of the war ===
Shortly after occupying Lukaya, the TPDF launched Operation Dada Idi, and in the following days the 207th and 208th Brigades cleared the Kampala road and captured Mpigi on 28 March. Ugandan and Libyan troops fled away from the front line towards the capital. Meanwhile, Ugandan opposition groups met in Moshi. They subsequently created the Uganda National Liberation Front (UNLF) as a unified umbrella organisation and established a cabinet. The successful formation of the UNLF government eased Tanzanian concerns about the aftermath of a seizure of the capital. Despite his troops' failure at Lukaya, Gaddafi further reinforced Amin with large amounts of equipment and 2,000 members of the People's Militia. The personnel and materiel were brought into Entebbe's international airport in a regular airlift. The PLO also sent a last batch of reinforcements, 75 guerrillas under the command of Mahmoud Da'as, to Uganda. Da'as divided the Palestinian fighters into two groups. One took part in aiding the defence of Kampala, whereas the other prepared evacuation routes through northern Uganda to Sudan.

In early April Tanzanian forces began to concentrate their efforts on weakening the Ugandan position in Kampala. Tanzanian commanders had originally assumed that Amin would station the bulk of his forces in the capital, and their initial plans called for a direct attack on the city. But from the high ground in Mpigi they could see the heavy amount of Libyan air traffic over the Entebbe peninsula and a large contingent of Ugandan and Libyan soldiers. Musuguri ordered the TPDF to secure the peninsula, and on 7 April the 208th Brigade captured it. Many Libyan soldiers tried to evacuate to Kampala but were intercepted and killed. Tanzanian commanders then began preparing to attack Kampala. Nyerere requested that they leave the eastern road from the city leading to Jinja clear so Libyan troops could evacuate. He thought that by allowing them to escape, Libya could avoid humiliation and quietly withdraw from the war. Nyerere also feared that further conflict with Libyan troops would incite Afro-Arab tensions and invite armed belligerence of other Arab states. He sent a message to Gaddafi explaining his decision, saying that the Libyans could be airlifted out of Uganda unopposed from the airstrip in Jinja. Most of them promptly vacated Kampala through the open corridor to Kenya and Ethiopia, where they were repatriated. The TPDF advanced into Kampala on 10 April, taking it with minimal resistance. Combat operations in Uganda continued until 3 June, when Tanzanian forces reached the Sudanese border and eliminated the last resistance. The TPDF withdrew from the country in 1981.

=== Legacy ===
The Battle of Lukaya was the largest engagement of the Uganda–Tanzania War. Despite the PLO's overall involvement in the Ugandan war effort, Nyerere did not harbour any ill will towards the organisation, instead citing its isolation on the international stage as the reason for its closeness to Amin. The PLO portrayed the Battle of Lukaya as a de facto victory, claiming that it had inflicted terrible losses on the TPDF and the eventual Ugandan defeat only stemmed from the incapabilities of the Uganda Army. On 7 February 1981 Obote gave Musuguri two spears in honour of "his gallant action in the Battle of Lukaya". Many years after the battle a large plaque was placed in Lukaya to commemorate the Libyan soldiers who were killed there. In the 2000s the Ugandan Government established the Order of Lukaya to be awarded to anti-Amin Ugandan rebels or allied foreigners who participated in the battle.
