= Madanjeet Singh =

Indian Foreign Service
- In office 1953–1984

Personal details
- Born: April 16, 1924 Lahore, Punjab, British India (now Punjab, Pakistan)
- Died: 6 January 2013 (aged 88) Beaulieu-sur-Mer, France
- Education: Government College, Lahore; Punjab University, Lahore
- Profession: Diplomat

Madanjeet Singh (16 April 1924 – 6 January 2013) was an Indian diplomat, painter, photographer, and writer.

== Biography ==
Madanjeet Singh was born on 16 April 1924 in Lahore, British India.

During Mahatma Gandhi's "Quit India" movement in 1942 against colonial rule, Madanjeet Singh was imprisoned. He later migrated to newly partitioned India in 1947 and worked as a volunteer in the refugee camps in Delhi, where those uprooted by partition found temporary refuge. He later joined the Indian Foreign Service in 1953 and served various countries like Italy, Yugoslavia, Greece, Laos, Sweden, Denmark, Spain, USSR, Consul General in South Vietnam. He served with distinction as Ambassador of India in Asia, South America, Africa and Europe before joining UNESCO in 1982, based in Paris.

In 1995, in recognition of his lifelong devotion to the cause of communal harmony and peace, the UNESCO Executive Board created the biennial ‘UNESCO-Madanjeet Singh Prize for the Promotion of Tolerance and Non-Violence’. The decision was adopted at meetings in Paris and Fez (16 May to 4 June), to commemorate the 125th birth anniversary of Mahatma Gandhi. In 2000, he was designated a UNESCO Goodwill Ambassador on the United Nations’ International Day of Tolerance.

Singh became known internationally with his first book, Indian Sculpture in Bronze and Stone, which was published in Rome by the Institute of the Middle and Far East in 1952. At that time he was a student of the orientalist Giuseppe Tucci, and also studied European art history under Lionelllo Venturi at Rome University. Indian Sculpture in Bronze and Stone was followed in 1954 by India, the first volume in the UNESCO world art series published by New York Graphic Society. He want on to write several more books including AJANTA, Paintings of the Sacred and the Secular (1964); Himalayan Art (1968); The White Horse (1976); This, My People (1989); The Sun in Myth and Art (1993); Renewable Energy of the Sun (1996); The Time-less Energy of the Sun (1998); The Time-less Energy of the Sun (1998); The Sasia Story (2005); The Oral and Intangible Heritage of South Asia (2007); and Kashmiriyat (2009).

In 2000, he was designated as a UNESCO Goodwill Ambassador on the United Nations’ International Day of Tolerance, a post he held until his death.

He founded the South Asia Foundation in 2000 as a regional youth movement and it has now grown to have chapters in eight SAARC countries. He was praised as a "freedom fighter. He is a Secular Humanist. The South Asia Foundation (SAF) has offered scholarships to South Asian students under various disciplines in its 8 UNESCO Madanjeet Singh Institutions of Excellence set up by Madanjeet Singh.

The UNESCO Madanjeet Singh Prize for the Promotion of Tolerance and Non-violence was created in 1995 to mark the United Nations Year for Tolerance, proclaimed at the initiative of UNESCO, and the 125th anniversary of the birth of the Mahatma Gandhi.

In recognition of a lifelong devotion to communal harmony and peace, the Prize bears the name of its benefactor Madanjeet Singh, who was a UNESCO Goodwill Ambassador, Indian Artist, Writer and Diplomat.

The UNESCO-Madanjeet Singh Prize for the Promotion of Tolerance and Non-Violence is aimed at advancing the spirit of tolerance in the arts, culture, education, science and communication.

== Death ==
On January 6, 2013, Singh died in Beaulieu-sur-Mer, France, at the age of 88 from a stroke.

== Books ==
His many publications include:

- Culture of the Sepulchre (2012) (his experiences as Indian Ambassador to Uganda at the time of Idi Amin), ISBN 0670085731
- Kashmiriyat - The pluralistic Sufi-Bhakti-Rishi Culture, South Asia Foundation (2009)
- SASIA Story UNESCO (2005)
- Himalayan Art (UNESCO art books series), New York Graphic Society/UNESCO (1968) ASIN B000LY5LNG - revised edition Macmillan (1971), ISBN 0-333-12066-3
- Ajanta, painting of the sacred and the secular, Edita Lausanne, 1965
