= Lukaya, Uganda =

Lukaya
- Map of Uganda showing the location of Lukaya
- Coordinates: 00°09′03″S 31°52′28″E
- Country: Uganda
- Region: Central
- District: Kalungu
- Elevation: 1,140 m (3,740 ft)

Population (2024 Census)
  - Total: 32,825
- Time zone: UTC+3 (EAT)

Lukaya is a town in the Kalungu District of the Central Region of Uganda. It is prominent for being a site of a battle, the battle of Lukaya, during the Uganda- Tanzania war.

== Location ==
Lukaya is on the Masaka–Kampala highway, close to the shores of Lake Victoria and just south of the equator. The town is approximately 26.5 kilometres (16 mi) north-east of Masaka, the nearest large city. This is approximately 106.5 kilometres (66 mi), by road, south-west of Kampala, the capital and largest city of Uganda. The coordinates of Lukaya are 0°09'03.0"S, 31°52'28.0"E (Latitude:-0.150833; Longitude:31.874444). Lukaya town is located at an average elevation of 1,140 metres (3,740 ft), above sea level.

== Overview ==
The town was founded by traders from India who traded primarily in coffee, cotton, and maize. Africans built restaurants and lodges in the town to cater for workers. Long distance truck drivers destined to the Western Region of Uganda and neighboring countries often stopped there to eat and rest. As of December 2017, the town had become a busy urban centre. Prostitution in Lukaya Town Council poses a health risk and is factor in the high HIV/AIDS prevalence in the town and surrounding neighborhoods. In 2013, the prevalence rate of HIV in the town was documented at 27 percent, compared to the national average of 7.3 percent, at the time.

== Population ==
The 2002 population census estimated the population of the town at 14,147. In 2010, the Uganda Bureau of Statistics (UBOS) estimated the population to be 15,300. In 2011, UBOS estimated the population at 15,500. In 2014, the national population census put the population at 24,250.

== Points of interest ==
The following additional points of interest are within the town limits or near its borders:

- mouth of the Katonga River, which enters Lake Victoria near Lukaya
- Lweera Swamp, a wetland that contains the sources of the River Katonga and reaches for nearly 20 kilometres (12 mi) along the highway between Lukaya to the south-west and Kayabwe to the north-east
- offices of Lukaya Town Council
- Lukaya central market
- Lukaya Health Centre
- Bajja Community Primary School
- King David High School.

== See also ==
- List of cities and towns in Uganda
