= Ngerengere =

Ward in Morogoro Rural District, Morogoro Region

Coordinates: 6°45′S 38°07′E

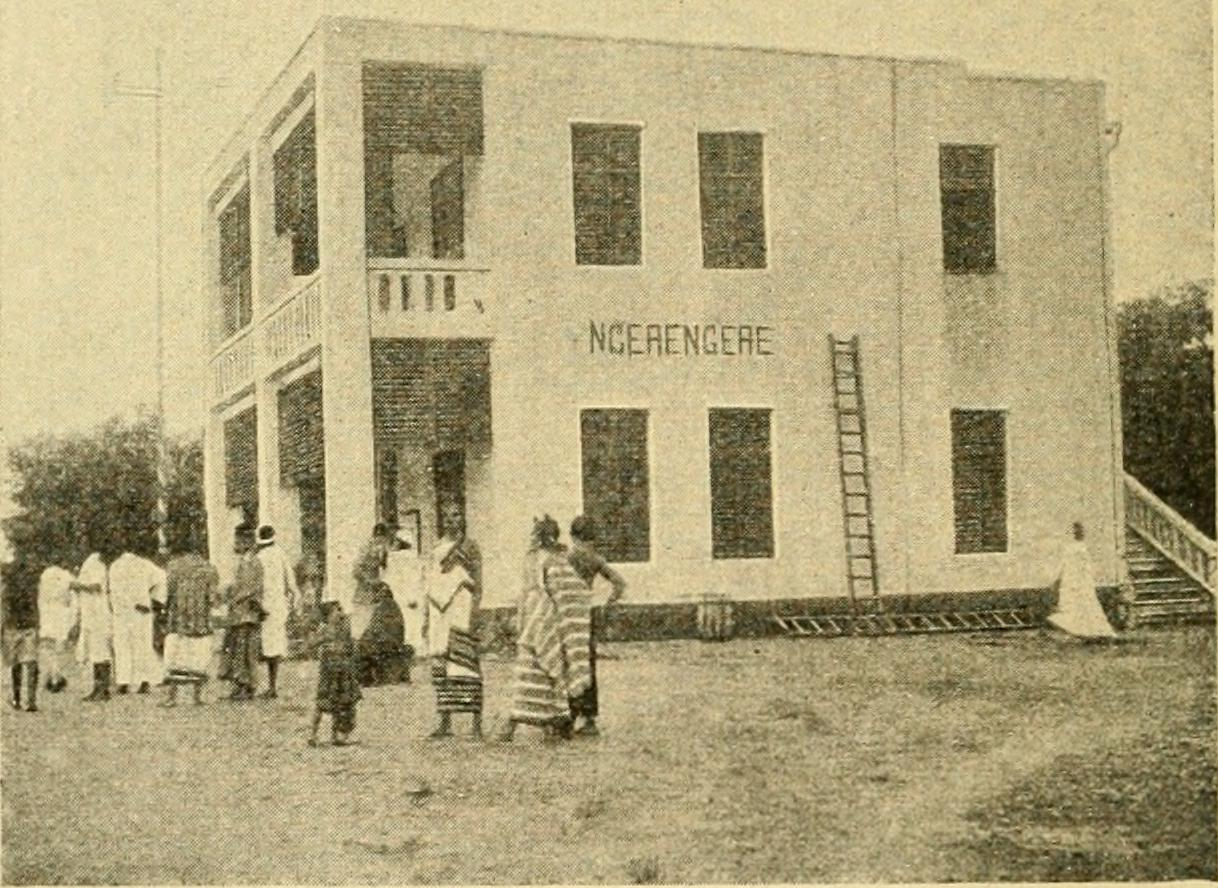
- Post office and station, c. 1900s
- Interactive map of Ngerengere
- Country: Tanzania
- Zone: Coastal
- Region: Morogoro
- District: Morogoro

Population (2012)
  - Total: 11,780
- Time zone: UTC+3 (EAT)
- Postcode: 67xxx

Ngerengere is a Tanzanian ward of Morogoro District in Morogoro Region. It is located south of the A7 trunk road that connects Dar es Salaam to Morogoro. It is named after the Ngerengere River. The Tanzanian Army's air force command maintains an airbase near the vicinity. As of 2022, Ngerengere had a population of 15, 509 people.
