= Jonas Van Zeeland =

Tanzania politician

Honorable Jonas Van Zeeland MP

Member of Parliament Mvomero Constituency
- Incumbent
- Assumed office 2020
- Preceded by: Tegweta Mbumba

Personal details
- Born: 20 April 1980 (age 46)
- Education: Mafiga Primary School; Kigurunyembe Secondary School

Janas Van Zeeland (born April 20, 1980) is a Tanzanian Chama Cha Mapinduzi politician and a Member of Parliament for Mvomero constituency since 2020.
