= Ngerengere Air Force Base =

Ngerengere Air Force Base Uwanja wa Ndegevita wa Ngerengere (Swahili)
- IATA: none; ICAO: HTNG

Summary
- Airport type: Military airbase
- Owner/Operator: Tanzania Air Force Command
- Location: Ngerengere, Morogoro District, Morogoro Region
- Built: c. 1970
- Commander: Joseph Kapwani
- Time zone: EAT (UTC+03:00)
- Elevation AMSL: 225 m / 738 ft
- Coordinates: 6°43′1.5″S 38°9′14.2″E
- Website: www.tpdf.mil.tz

Map

Runways
Direction	Length		Surface
Direction	m	ft	Surface
02/20	2,408	7,900	Concrete

Ngerengere Air Force Base (ICAO: HTNG) is a military airbase of the Tanzania Air Force Command. It is located about 120 kilometres (75 mi) west of Dar es Salaam, in Ngerengere ward, Morogoro District of Morogoro Region in Tanzania.

== History ==
The airbase was built with assistance from the Chinese government. During the Uganda–Tanzania War, a squadron of MiG aircraft en route to Mwanza Airport in northern Tanzania was hit in a friendly fire whilst flying over the nearby Musoma town. All three aircraft were hit by SAM-2 missiles fired by the army's anti-aircraft units, who mistook it for enemy aircraft as they had not been informed.

On 28 June 2010, an FT-5 (registration JW-9119) whilst on a routine training mission, lost communication with the airbase and made an emergency landing on the A14 highway. Upon landing, one of its wings crashed onto a tourist vehicle; resulting in the deaths of both the instructor and trainee.

== Operations ==
The airbase maintains a prohibited (HTP6) and a restricted airspace (HTR7) west of Dar es Salaam's Julius Nyerere International Airport. A number of civilian aircraft have infringed into these areas, and the Tanzania Civil Aviation Authority has advised pilots to keep away at all times.

A report published in 1996 by the Tanzania Accident Investigation Branch recommended that the prohibited area (HTP6) ought to be modified in order to facilitate easier access to towns west of Dar es Salaam. It also stated that civilian aircraft were able to fly over it upon request to Ngerengere Tower, contrary to its designation as a civilian no-fly zone. The nearby Morogoro Airstrip is located just off the western side of HTP6 but within HTR7. According to a local pilot, the detour over the airbase results in an additional 15 minutes to the flight duration between Morogoro and Dar es Salaam.
