= Emmanuel Kwihangana =

Uganda air chief of staff

AVM Emmanuel Kwihangana

Acting-Chief of Air Staff of the Uganda Air Force
- Incumbent
- Assumed office 29 June 2019
- Preceded by: Major General James Birungi

Personal details
- Occupation: Engineering, Military

Military service
- Allegiance: Ugandan Air Force
- Branch/service: Uganda
- Years of service: 1990

Emmanuel Kwihangana is an air force engineer currently appointed as the acting chief of air staff of the Uganda Air Force, replaced Major General James Birungi. He previously held a position as a director in Engineering department of the Ugandan People's Defence Forces Air Force.

Colonel Emmanuel is an engineer by profession and had held various positions such includes; Director Operations, director of Engineering and director Personnel and Administration in the air force before being the acting chief of air staff.
