= Tanzania Air Force Command =

Air warfare branch of Tanzania's military

- Jeshi la Anga lA Tanzania
- Tanzania Air Force Command Insignia
- Founded: 1965; 61 years ago
- Country: Tanzania
- Role: Aerial warfare
- Part of: Tanzania People's Defence Force
- Engagements: Uganda–Tanzania War

Commanders
- Commander: Major General Shaban Mani

Aircraft flown
- Fighter: Chengdu F-7, Shenyang F-6
- Helicopter: Bell 412, Airbus H125, Airbus H155, Airbus H225LP
- Trainer: K-8 Karakorum, Shenyang FT-6, Chengdu FT-7
- Transport: Antonov An-28, Shaanxi Y-8, Harbin Y-12

The Tanzania Air Force Command (Swahili: Kamandi ya Jeshi la Anga) is the aerial service branch of the Tanzania People's Defence Force (TPDF). The current commander of the Tanzania Air Force Command is Major General Shaban Mani, who replaced major general Ingram upon the latter's retirement in 2021.

== History ==
Tanzania established its air force as the "Air Wing" (Kiswahili: Usafirashaji wa Anga) of the Tanzania People's Defence Force's (TPDF) Air Defence Command in 1965. An autonomous branch, its purposes were to support the TPDF ground forces and ensure air links between the government and distant areas of the country.

The Tanzania Air Defence Command defeated the nominally stronger Uganda Army Air Force during the air campaign of the Uganda–Tanzania War (1978–79).

A few of the Tanzanian air wing's transport remain serviceable. However, its Shenyang F-5s, F-6C and Chengdu F-7s are reported to fly only on rare occasions because of airworthiness problems. Tanzania's long coastline means that transports are also used for patrol flights.

In 1980, an order for 10 F-7Bs and two TF-7s was issued to China, and in 1997 also two F-7Ns were purchased from Iran, together with four ex-Iraqi Air Force transports of an unknown type. Today, no Russian-supplied MiG-21s remain in service with the TPDF/AW, and only three or four F-7s remain operational. The TPDF/AW MiG-21MFs are now confirmed to have carried serials - in black or green - underneath the cockpit, but no details about these are known.

On 14 November 2013, Helmoed-Römer Heitman reported for Jane's Defence Weekly that a 'usually reliable source' had informed Jane's that the TPDF had replaced its 12 old CAC J-7 fighters with 14 new J-7s, twelve single-seat and two dual-seat. Deliveries were completed in 2011. Heitman also reported that the aircraft were fully operational at Dar es Salaam and Mwanza air bases.

Recent estimates (2014) suggest that Tanzania's air force command operates 32 aircraft in three different types. It is believed they are operating 14 fighters, 11 fixed-wing attack aircraft and 7 transport aircraft. On October 1, 2015, a K-8 trainer jet of Tanzania Air Force Command crashed into the sea killing both pilots.

== Aircraft ==
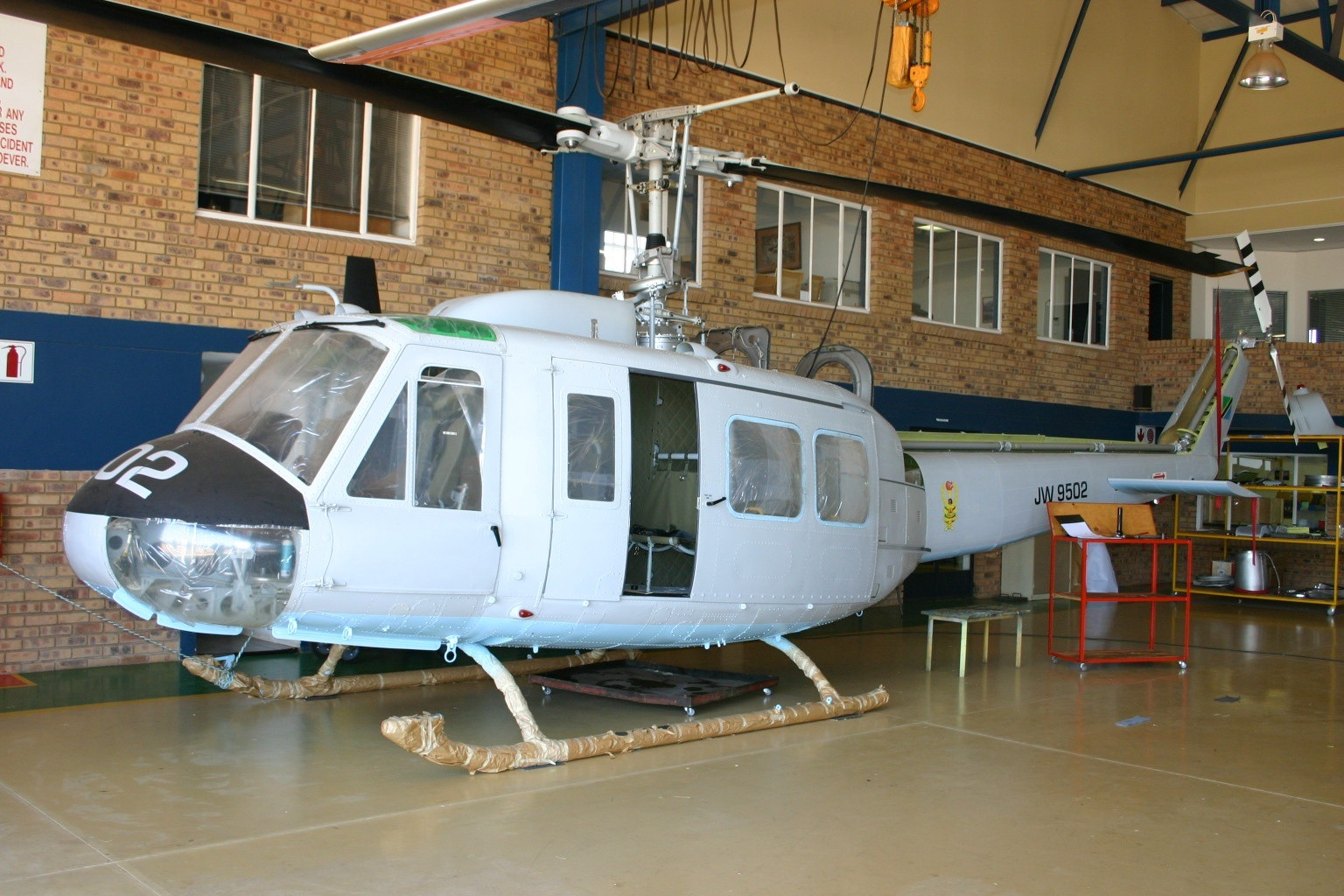
A Bell 205 of the Tanzania Air Force Command

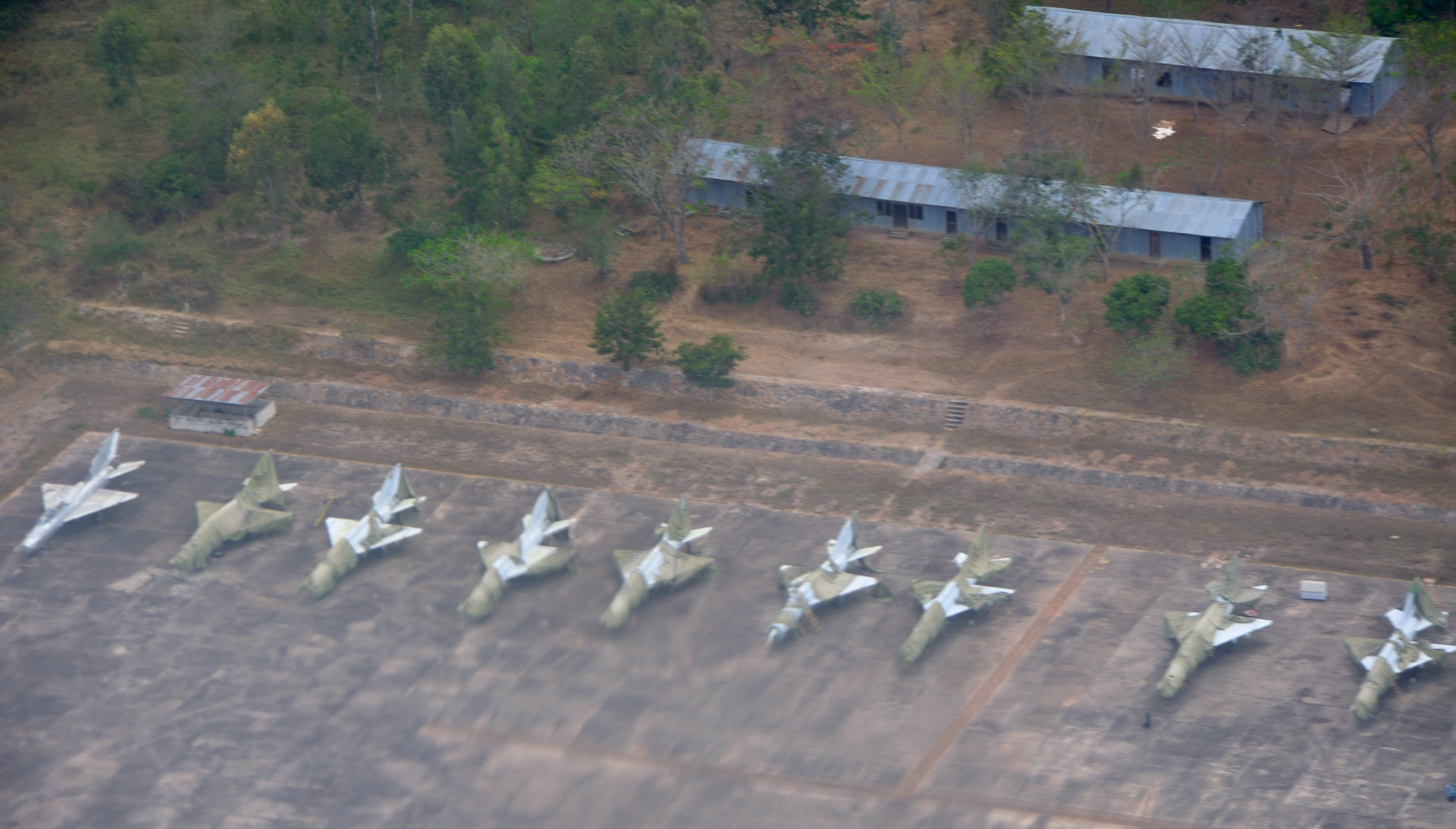
A line of Tanzanian F-7s

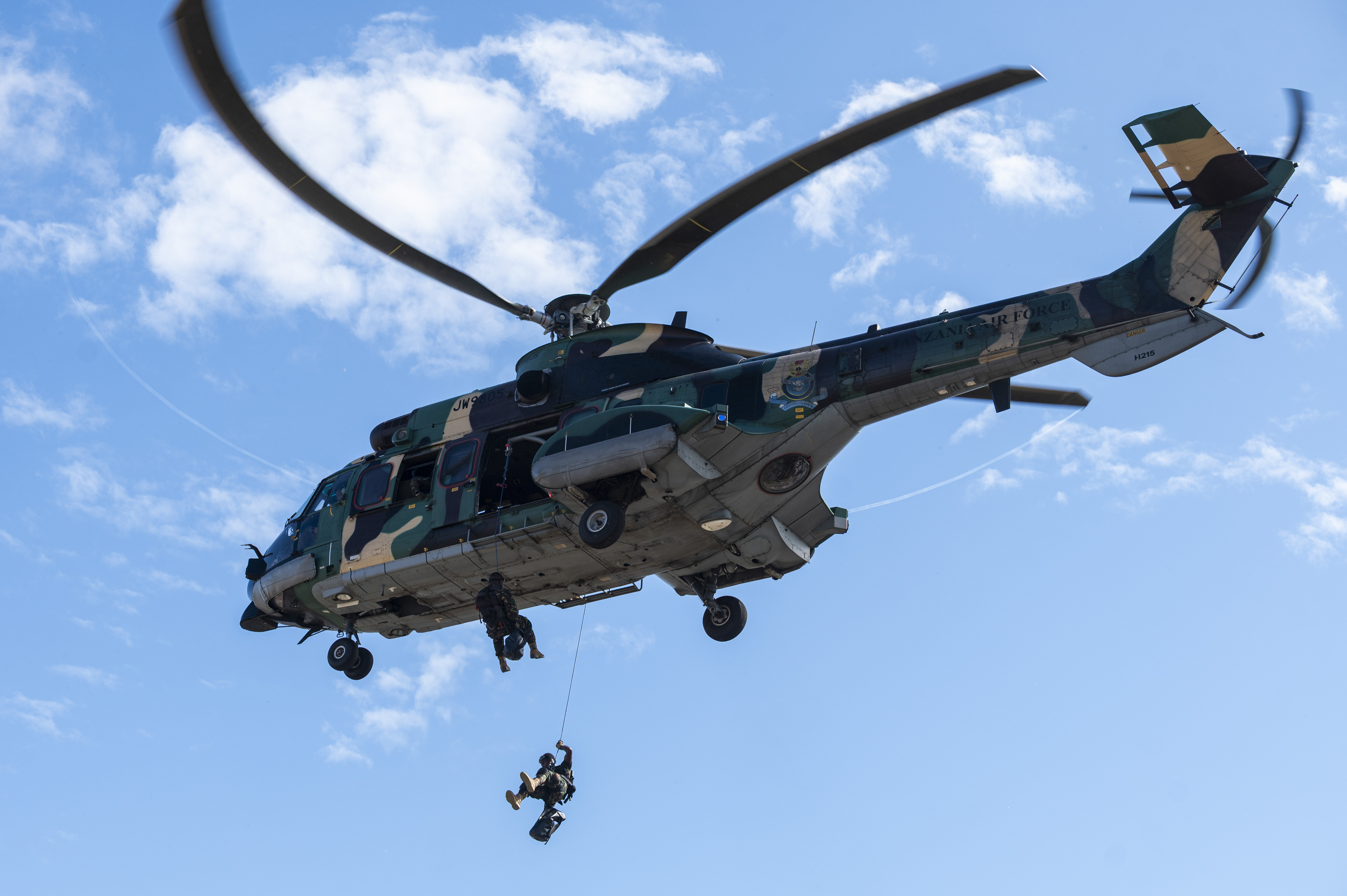
Tanzania Air Force Command Eurocopter EC725

Aircraft	Origin	Type	Variant	In service	Notes
Combat aircraft
Chengdu F-7	China	Fighter	B/N/TN	11	Licensed built MiG-21
Transport
Cessna 402	United States	Transport		1	
Shaanxi Y-8	China	Transport		2	
Harbin Y-12	China	Transport		2	
Alenia C-27J Spartan	Italy	Transport		1 delivered	1 on order
CASA/IPTN CN-235	Spain / Indonesia	Transport	CN-235M	1	
Helicopters
Bell 412	United States	Utility		2	
Airbus H155	France	Utility		2	
Airbus H225M	France	Utility		2	
Airbus H215M	France	Utility		4	
Airbus H125M	France	Utility		5	
Trainer aircraft
Hongdu JL-8	China	Jet trainer	K-8	4	
Chengdu J-7	China	Conversion trainer	FT-7	2	

=== Retired aircraft ===
Antonov An-28

=== Bases ===
- Ukonga Air Base, Dar es Salaam
- Mwanza Air Base, Mwanza
- Ngerengere Air Force Base, Morogoro

== Commanding officer ==
Name (birth–death)	Term of office		
Name (birth–death)	Took office	Left office	Time in office
Brigadier General; Robert Mboma	February 15, 1982	March 28, 1994	12 years, 41 days
Major General; Jumanne Omari Mwakitosi	March 29, 1994	July 1, 2003	8 years, 100 days
Brigadier General; Geofrey Dahal	July 1, 2003	April 25, 2005	1 year, 298 days
Brigadier General; Charles Makakala	July 2, 2005	October 16, 2007	2 years, 174 days
Brigadier General; Festo Ulomi	October 17, 2007	March 19, 2012	4 years, 154 days
Brigadier General; Joseph Kapwani	March 20, 2012	January 31, 2016	3 years, 317 days
Brigadier General; George Ingram	February 1, 2016	August 22, 2021	5 years, 202 days
Major General; Shabani Mani	August 23, 2021	Incumbent	5 years, 37 days

== See also ==
- Tanzania Government Flight Agency
