= Andrew Mukooza =

Ugandan military officer (1944–1979)

Commander of the Uganda Army Air Force
- In office 1979
- President: Idi Amin
- Preceded by: Christopher Israel Umba Gore
- Succeeded by: None (UAAF destroyed) (Note: The Uganda Army Air Force ceased to exist in 1979. Subsequent Ugandan governments attempted to rebuild an air force, but only acquired a few helicopters. The small helicopter unit established in 1982 was led by Captain Peter Oringi.)

Personal details
- Born: 21 July 1944 Mbulamuti, Busoga, British Uganda
- Died: 24 April 1979 (aged 34) Kampala, Uganda
- Spouse: Miriam Katumba
- Children: Andrew, Becky, Thomas, Peter

Military service
- Allegiance: Uganda
- Branch/service: Uganda Army Air Force (UAAF)
- Years of service: 1960s–1979
- Rank: Lieutenant colonel
- Commands: Uganda Army Air Force (UAAF); MiG-17 squadron
- Battles/wars: Uganda–Tanzania War; Air campaign

Andrew Joet Mukooza (21 July 1944 – 24 April 1979) was a Ugandan military officer and fighter pilot who served as the last head of the Uganda Army Air Force before its destruction during the Uganda–Tanzania War. He was also Idi Amin's personal pilot during the latter's rule of Uganda.

Born in eastern Uganda, Mukooza joined the air force during the presidency of Milton Obote. After Amin took power in 1971, Mukooza stayed firmly loyal to his regime, and consequently rose in the ranks. He possibly helped Amin to defeat a coup attempt in 1977, drawing the ire of Uganda's opposition. When the Uganda–Tanzania War broke out, Mukooza initially flew missions as a fighter pilot and became head of the Uganda Army Air Force when the latter began to disintegrate amid heavy combat losses, defections, and desertions. Following the defeat of Amin, Mukooza surrendered to the new Tanzanian-backed government of Uganda, but was murdered under uncertain circumstances.

== Biography ==
=== Early life and career ===
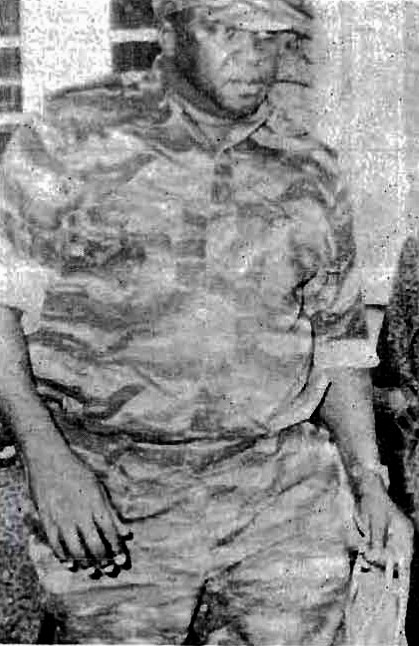
Mukooza rose through the ranks under President Idi Amin (pictured).

Andrew Joet Mukooza was born to Yoramu Mukooza and his wife Erina in Mbulamuti, Busoga, Uganda Protectorate on 21 July 1944. His father was murdered soon after Andrew's birth, resulting in his mother remarrying her brother-in-law Gershom Mukooza per Busoga customs. Andrew went on to study at the Kiira College Butiki and Teso College Aloet. After Uganda's independence, Mukooza joined the nascent Uganda Army Air Force (UAAF), and was sent to the Soviet Union to receive training on flying MiG aircraft. Upon returning to his home country, he was stationed at Gulu Air Force Base where he met Miriam Katumba, a nurse working at the Gulu Government Hospital. The two married at some point between 1969 and 1971 and had four children.

In January 1971, army chief Idi Amin overthrew the government of Milton Obote and installed himself as President of Uganda. Obote fled into exile, from where he conspired to regain power. Mukooza survived the subsequent political purges, and was selected as one of the pilots of Amin's new Grumman Gulfstream II private jet. To learn how to fly the Gulfstream II, Mukooza and three other pilots were sent to the United States to train at the Flight Safety Academy, Savannah, and acquired commercial licences at Vero Beach. The four returned with the Gulfstream II in 1974, but continued to train with American instructors. Mukooza consequently relocated with his family to Entebbe. He received further training at the local airport by Grumman captain Tom Friedrich, while Miriam started to work at the Entebbe Grade A hospital.

Amin's rule remained precarious, as the President's rivals and dissatisfied subordinates conspired against him. One of the most serious coup attempts took place in June 1977, as restive members of the Uganda Army plotted with Ugandan exiles to murder Amin. This coup attempt, code-named "Operation Mafuta Mingi", was well planned, and almost succeeded. Just hours before the coup plotters wanted to strike, Uganda's secret service, the State Research Bureau (SRB), was informed and saved Amin's life. Before the attack was carried out, Mukooza had been contacted by his former comrade Anthony Bazaalaki and other Basoga pilots who had defected to the opposition. They had asked him to join the assassination attempt, but he refused. The SRB later informed Amin that Mukooza had stayed loyal during the coup attempt. The President was pleased and promoted Mukooza to lieutenant colonel and commander of the MiG-17 squadron in August 1977.

=== The Uganda–Tanzania War and death ===
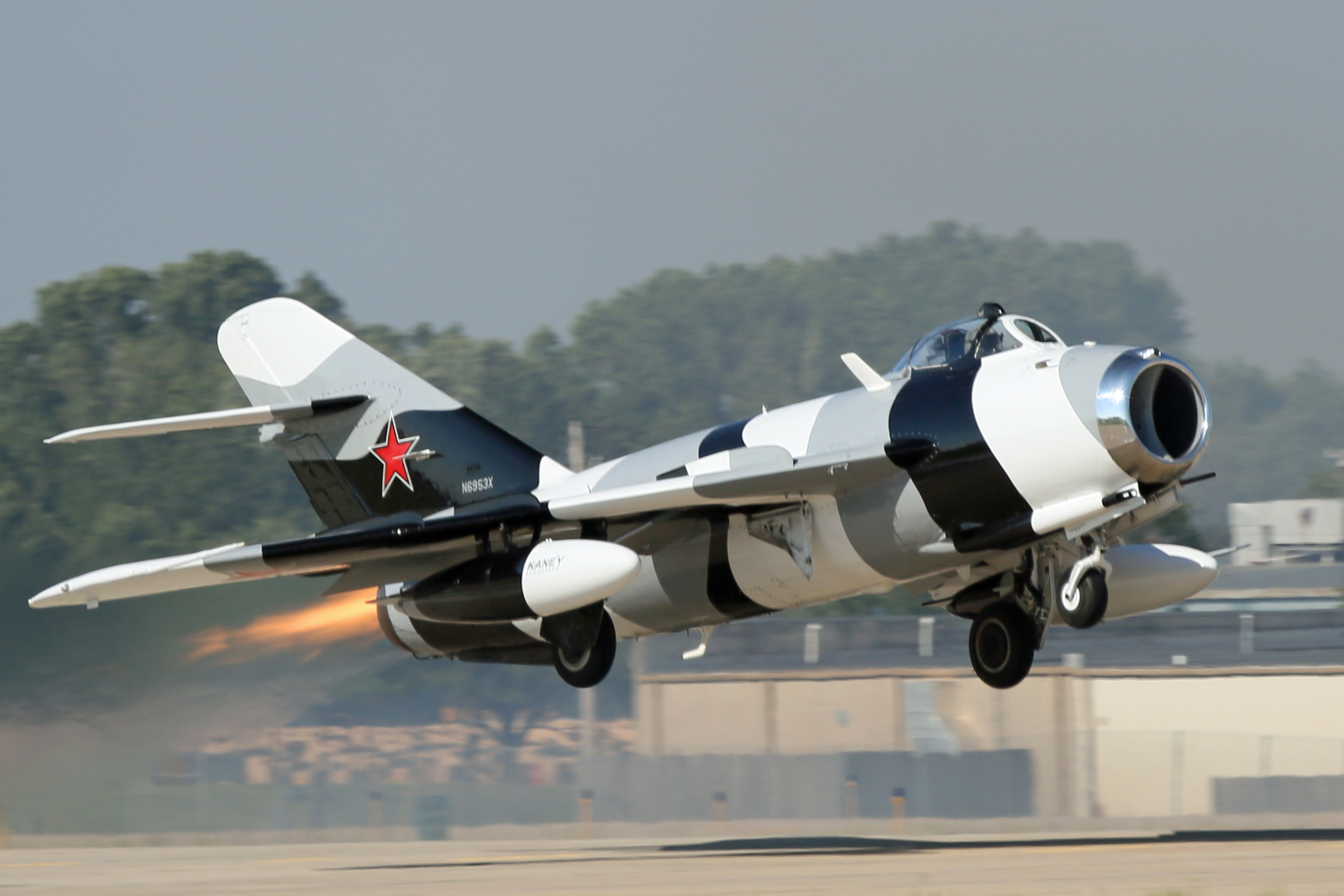
Mukooza flew a MiG-17 (example pictured) during the air campaign of the Uganda–Tanzania War.

Long-standing tensions between Uganda and Tanzania resulted in open warfare in late 1978, following the Ugandan military invasion of the Kagera salient under unclear circumstances. The Uganda Army Air Force assisted the invasion by attacking military and civilian targets in northern Tanzania. President Amin personally ordered Mukooza and his co-pilot Levi Mugyenyi to fly a bombing mission with their MiG-17. The two carried out the mission, but were almost shot down by Tanzanian anti-aircraft fire. Despite the efforts of the UAAF, the Tanzanians repulsed the Kagera invasion and counter-attacked. Uganda suffered several major defeats, and its air force was gradually worn down. The UAAF suffered catastrophic losses in February 1979, and its chief commander Christopher Israel Umba Gore disappeared. Gore's fate is unclear; he either fled to Sudan or was killed in an ambush, leaving Mukooza as acting commander of the Uganda Army Air Force. Mukooza realized that Amin's regime was collapsing. To keep his family out of harm's way, he sent them to Kaababbi in Busiro on 25 February 1979. As the Tanzania People's Defence Force (TPDF) approached Entebbe, Mukooza fled the town with a helicopter on 6 April 1979, relocating to Kimaka in Jinja. Lieutenant Colonel Cyril Orambi was left in charge of Entebbe's defenses. The Battle of Entebbe on 7 April 1979 resulted in the destruction of most of the UAAF. Panic spread at the other air bases, and what remained of the Uganda Army Air Force completely disintegrated. This left Mukooza with no means to continue the fight, and he stayed in Jinja. By the Uganda–Tanzania War's end, the UAAF was left completely destroyed.

The capital Kampala fell to the TPDF and its Ugandan rebel allies on 10–11 April 1979, followed by Jinja on 22 April 1979. Initially unsure about what to do, Mukooza decided to surrender to the new Tanzanian-backed government in Kampala on 24 April. He travelled to the capital using a friend's motorcycle to avoid being arrested at military checkpoints. When Mukooza arrived at Kampala's Nile Mansions, he was escorted to the office of David Oyite-Ojok, the Uganda National Liberation Army's chief of staff. Oyite-Ojok angrily asked Mukooza why he had not joined Bazaalaki's old plot to kill Amin in 1977, prompting the pilot to respond that he had only followed his professional code of conduct as soldier. After this interrogation, Oyite-Ojok ordered Radio Uganda journalist Mukalazi Kyobe to record Mukooza's surrender. Afterwards, the UAAF commander was secretly executed, and his body dumped at the Mbuya Military Hospital compound. According to researcher Muwonge Magembe, Bazaalaki convinced Oyite-Ojok to arrange his execution. The police eventually collected his body and identified him based on his driving permit. The police did not inform anyone, however, and instead registered "an unidentified male-dark-tall body" which they handed over to Mulago Hospital's mortuary. He was probably buried in a mass grave at Bukasa near Kirinya, Jinja District on 2 May 1979.

His family subsequently began to search for his whereabouts. Elly Malagala and Barnabas, his brothers-in-law, drove to his home in Entebbe in hopes of finding him alive. Mukooza's house was deserted except for a stray dog, however, and had been looted and vandalised. Grumman Corporation also searched for Mukooza, as he was entitled to US$20,000 from the company's provident fund. The corporation confirmed his death in 1988.

== Personal life ==
Andrew Mukooza had two younger half-sisters, Gertrude and Kalivvamu, and four children, namely Andrew, Becky, Thomas, and Peter. He was a close friend of Isaac Lumago.

== See also ==
- Ali Kiiza
