= Morogoro Airstrip =

Morogoro Airstrip Uwanja mdogo wa Ndege wa Morogoro
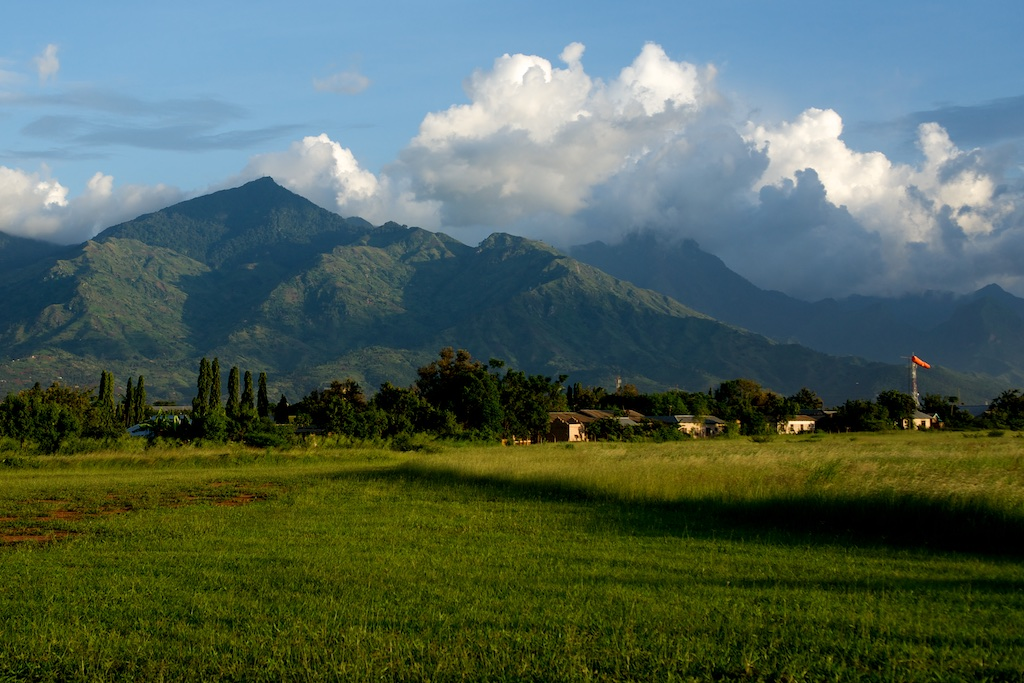
- The airstrip is near the Uluguru Mountains.
- IATA: none; ICAO: HTMG; WMO: 63866

Summary
- Airport type: Public
- Owner: Government of Tanzania
- Operator: Tanzania Airports Authority
- Location: Morogoro, Tanzania
- Elevation AMSL: 1,676 ft (511 m)
- Coordinates: 6°47′50″S 37°39′10″E
- Website: www.taa.go.tz

Map
- Location of airstrip in Tanzania HTMG (Africa)

Runways
Direction	Length		Surface
Direction	m	ft	Surface
03/21	1,070	3,510	Grass
- Sources: TCAA GCM Google Maps

Morogoro Airstrip (ICAO: HTMG) is an airstrip serving the city of Morogoro in the Morogoro Region of Tanzania. It is 3.5 kilometres (2.2 mi) north of the town. The airstrip location is just off the western side of the prohibited airspace (HTP6) of the Ngerengere Air Force Base but lies within the restricted airspace (HTR7).

== Airlines and destinations ==
Airlines	Destinations
Auric Air	Dar es Salaam

== See also ==
- List of airports in Tanzania
- Transport in Tanzania
