= Christopher Israel Umba Gore =

Ugandan military officer

Commander of the Uganda Army Air Force
- In office 1978–1979
- President: Idi Amin
- Succeeded by: Andrew Mukooza

Personal details
- Born: Sudan (Note: George Ivan Smith listed Uganda's West Nile Province as Gore's place of origin.)
- Died: 1979 (disputed)
- Relations: ca:Alfred Lado Gore (brother)

Military service
- Allegiance: Uganda
- Branch/service: Uganda Army (UA)
- Years of service: ? – 1979
- Rank: Lieutenant colonel
- Commands: Suicide Battalion; Uganda Army Air Force
- Battles/wars: Uganda–Tanzania War; Air campaign

Christopher Israel Umba Gore, (Note: His surname has also been spelled "Gole", and he has been called Gore Christopher. Researcher Andrew Rice suggested that "Gore" was not his surname, but a nickname.) also known as Gadwin Gore, was an Ugandan military officer who served as head of the Uganda Army Air Force during the last stages of President Idi Amin's dictatorship. He disappeared during the Uganda–Tanzania War, with some sources claiming that he either died in combat in 1979 or escaped to southern Sudan.

== Biography ==
Christopher Israel Umba Gore was born in southern Sudan. He was of Madi, Baka, or Kakwa ethnic origin. (Note: The Baka and Kawka were closely allied in Uganda, sometimes resulting in confusion about who belonged to which group. Another source claimed that Gore was a Lugbara. According to Gore's direct subordinate Rwehururu, however, Lugbara soldiers actually resented Gore for not being one of them.) His father was a member of Juba's old nobility, and he was able to afford attending school in Sudan. Though Gore qualified as a teacher, he was unable to get a job in his home country. As result, he travelled to Kenya in hopes of getting employed as a teacher there; instead, he heard of the large-scale recruitment drives for the military in neighboring Uganda. At the time, Ugandan politicians were struggling for power, backed by the country's numerous tribal groups. The main political rivals, Uganda Army chief Idi Amin (mainly supported by the West Nile tribes) and President Milton Obote (mainly backed by the Acholi and Langi), were recruiting as many members of their own tribal groups into the military as possible to secure power over the country's military. Gore consequently enlisted in the Uganda Army as officer cadet, and was sent on a training course in Greece. There, he decided to switch from the officer course to the one for paratroopers which was harsher but also shorter. Following the conclusion of his training in Greece, Gore became second lieutenant and started to work at the School of Infantry in Uganda.

In 1971, Amin launched a coup d'état, ousting Obote and installing himself as president. As member of a West Nile tribal group and dependant of Amin, Gore was among those who profited from the coup. He was rapidly promoted, becoming lieutenant colonel and head of the Mechanised Specialist Reconnaissance Regiment in Masaka, better known as the "Suicide Battalion", by 1973. Gore quickly gained a reputation as "the most ferocious and vicious commander" of the Uganda Army. According to one of his subordinates, Colonel Bernard Rwehururu, Gore was not fond of administrative work, and instead preferred to solve issues through fistfights. A hands-on leader, he "did not know or care much about matters of command". While serving as commander of the Suicide Battalion, Gore was the target of a conspiracy by two majors, Asega and Nasur Ezaga, who were Lugbara and resented being commanded by someone of West Nile or Sudanese origin.

In September 1975 Gore allegedly attempted an coup against Amin, possibly to avenge the death of foreign minister Michael Ondoga.

President Amin appointed Gore the base commandant of the Field Marshal Amin Air Force Base, and administrative officer coordinating all Uganda Army Air Force (UAAF) bases in the country in December 1977. In an official announcement, Amin explained Gore's appointment with the latter's leadership qualitities which he had showcased while commanding the Suicide Battalion. By 1978, Gore was the official head of the UAAF and was one of the few remaining loyal followers of President Amin. In October 1978, a war broke out between Uganda and Tanzania under unclear circumstances. The conflict turned against Uganda, resulting in plans by some officers to overthrow Amin. The President used Gore, along with a few other loyalists, to prevent such an uprising from happening. Gore disappeared during the war's later stages. It is disputed what happened to him. Rwehururu claimed that Gore fled to Sudan upon realizing that Amin's regime was collapsing. Africa Confidential reported that he was living in exile in southern Sudan around 1983. In contrast, an Ugandan soldier interviewed by the Drum magazine stated that Gore had been shot dead while travelling with Amin near the frontline in 1979. Gore was succeeded as Air Force chief by Andrew Mukooza. The Uganda Army Air Force mostly disintegrated in the last months of the Uganda–Tanzania War, and was effectively eliminated as fighting force during the Battle of Entebbe on 7 April 1979.

== Personal life ==
Gore was a Christian. According to Rwehururu, he was "a meticulously clean fellow". Once, Gore even beat up one of Idi Amin's personal favorites for being unhygienic and defiant about it, incurring the President's wrath. He was also notorious for his recreational drug use, and "seldom seen without a marijuana spliff in his mouth".

Christopher Gore had a brother, Alfred Lado Gore, who is a South Sudanese rebel leader and politician.
