= Morogoro Rural District =

Morogoro Rural District Wilaya ya Morogoro Vijijini
- District
- Morogoro District of Morogoro Region
- Coordinates: 06°54′S 037°54′E
- Country: Tanzania
- Region: Morogoro Region

Area
  - Total: 12,457 km^{2} (4,810 sq mi)

Population (2022)
  - Total: 387,736
  - Density: 31.126/km^{2} (80.616/sq mi)

Morogoro Rural District (Swahili: Wilaya ya Morogoro Vijijini) is one of the six districts of the Morogoro Region of Tanzania. Morogoro Rural District covers 19,056 square kilometres (7,358 sq mi). It is bordered to the north and east by the Pwani Region, to the south by Kilombero District, to the southwest by the Kilosa District and to the west by the Mvomero District and the Morogoro Urban District.

As of 2012, the population of the Morogoro Rural District was 286,248. By 2022, the population had grown to 387,736.

== Administrative subdivisions ==
=== Constituencies ===
For parliamentary elections, Tanzania is divided into constituencies. As of the 2010 elections Morogoro Rural District had no constituencies: The Morogoro-Kusini-Mashariki Constituency is located in Morogoro Urban District.

=== Divisions ===
As of 1997, Morogoro Rural District had ten administrative divisions; however, as the number of wards has shrunk from forty-two in 1997 to twenty-five in 2002, it now has six divisions.

==== 1997 divisions ====
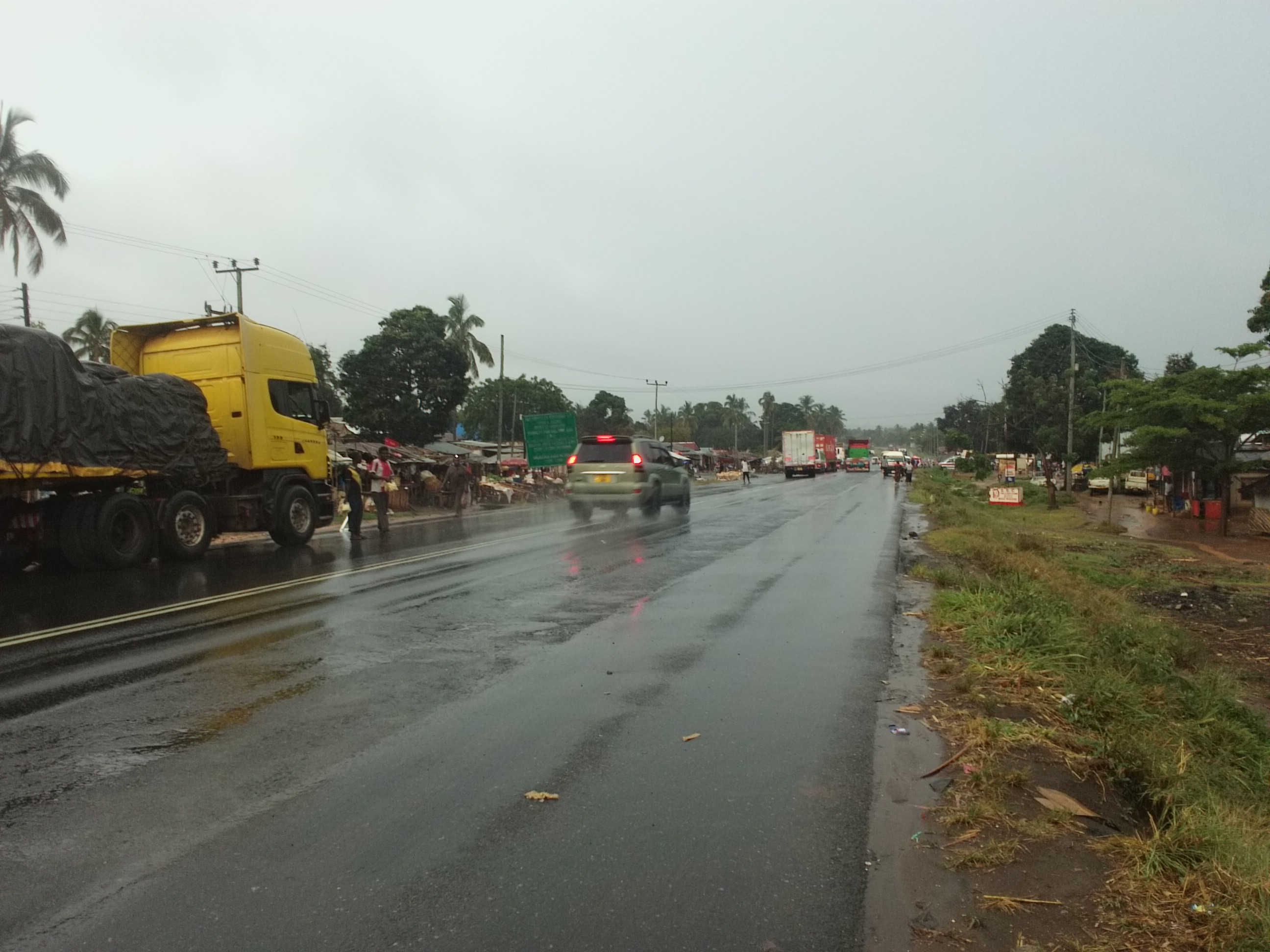
Mikese road

Among the 1997 divisions were:

1. Bwakira division,
2. Mgeta division,
3. Mlali division,
4. Mvuha division.

=== Wards ===
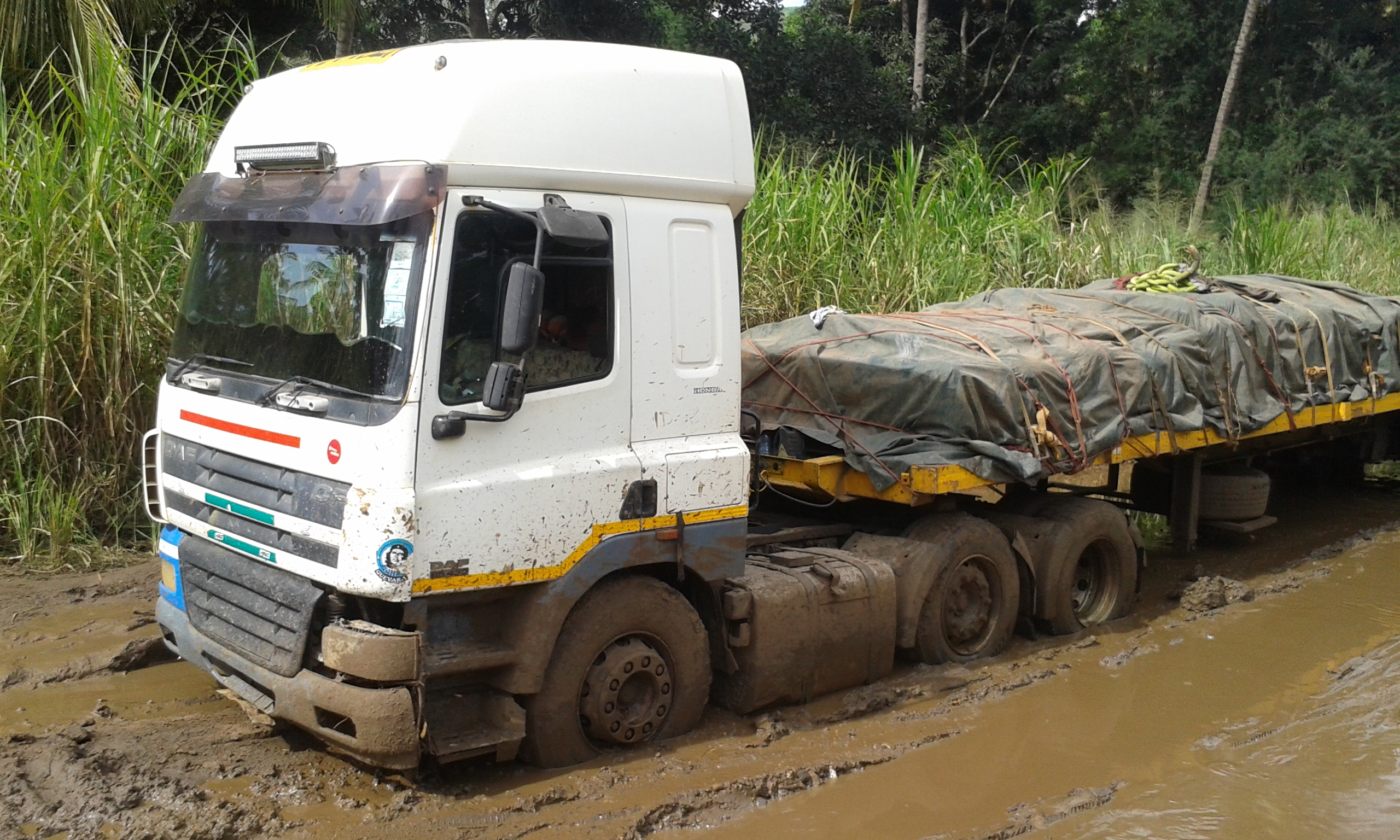
A mud flood during rainy season

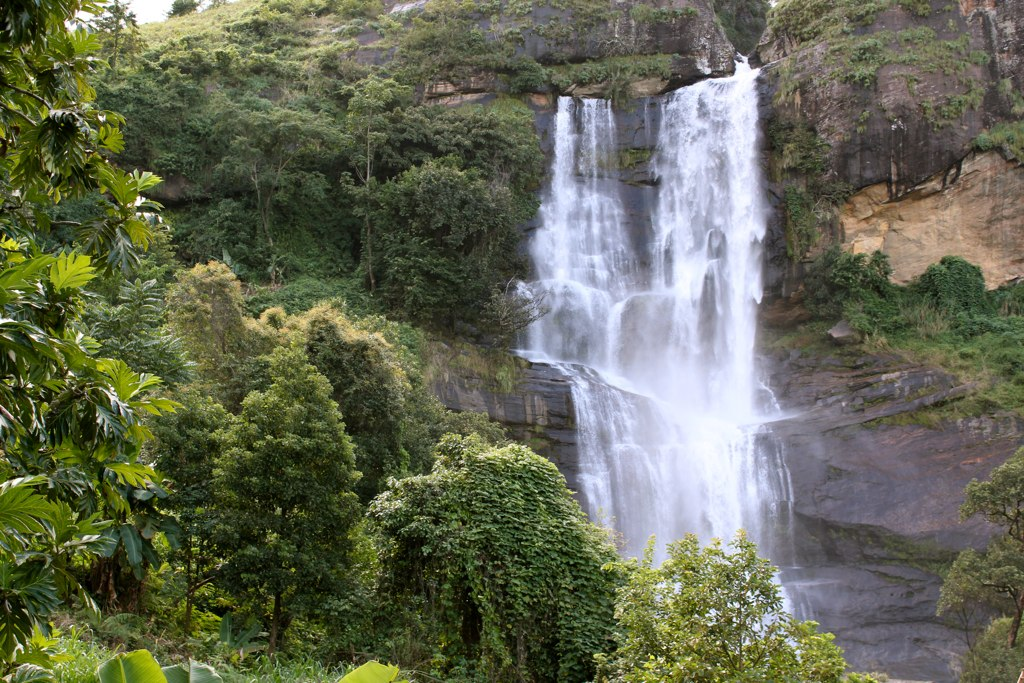
Waterfalls near Kinole

The Morogoro Rural District is administratively divided into twenty-five wards:

- Bwakila Chini
- Bwakila Juu
- Kasanga
- Kibogwa
- Kibungo Juu
- Kidugalo
- Kinole
- Kiroka
- Kisaki
- Kisemu
- Kolero
- Lundi
- Mikese
- Mkambalani
- Mkulazi
- Mkuyuni
- Mngazi
- Mvuha
- Mtombozi
- Ngerengere
- Selembala
- Singisa
- Tawa
- Tegetero
- Tununguo
- Gwata
- Konde
- Bungu
- Matuli
