= Battle of Entebbe =

1979 battle of the Uganda-Tanzania War

- Part of the Uganda–Tanzania War
- Battle of Entebbe (Uganda)
| Date | 7 April 1979 |
| Location | Entebbe, Uganda |
| Result | Tanzanian victory |
| Territorial changes | Entebbe occupied by Tanzanian forces |

Belligerents
| Tanzania | Uganda; Libya |

Commanders and leaders
| Mwita Marwa; Salim Hassan Boma | Cyril Orambi (surrendered) |

Casualties and losses
| Unknown | 300+ Libyans killed 40+ Libyans captured 200–365 Uganda Army Air Force personnel captured 1 Libyan Lockheed C-130 Hercules destroyed 12 Ugandan MiGs disabled |

The Battle of Entebbe was a battle of the Uganda–Tanzania War that took place on 7 April 1979 on the Entebbe peninsula in Uganda between Tanzanian units and Ugandan and Libyan units. The Tanzanians occupied the area, killed hundreds of Libyans, and ended the Libyan airlift in support of the Ugandan government.

Idi Amin had seized power in Uganda in 1971 and established a brutal dictatorship. Seven years later he attempted to invade neighbouring Tanzania to the south. The attack was repulsed, and Tanzanian President Julius Nyerere ordered a counter-attack into Ugandan territory. As Tanzanian forces advanced deeper into the country, Libya sent its own troops to support the Ugandans, flying them in to the airport at Entebbe. From their position in Mpigi the Tanzanians could see the Libyan air traffic, so they decided to attack the location to stop the airlift and eliminate a potential flank attack ahead of their assault on Kampala.

Tanzanian forces conducted a light three-day bombardment of the Entebbe peninsula, driving away Amin from his presidential residence and instigating the retreat of many Ugandan forces. On the morning of 7 April the Tanzanian 208th Brigade attacked the peninsula. After one of their aircraft was blown up, the Libyans attempted to evacuate via road to Kampala. Many of their units were intercepted and destroyed, while most Ugandan soldiers surrendered. There was little fighting within the town of Entebbe, and the peninsula was secured by the Tanzanians in the late afternoon. Over 300 Libyan soldiers were killed, and at least 200 Uganda Army Air Force personnel were captured. The Tanzanians also seized a large amount of Libyan heavy equipment and several Ugandan jets.

Tanzanian forces moved their headquarters to Entebbe and prepared for their attack on Kampala, while local civilians looted abandoned properties. Nyerere ordered his forces to leave an eastern corridor from the capital open, so the remaining Libyan units in the country could escape, thus sparing Libya international embarrassment and avoiding the incitement of Afro-Arab tensions. The Tanzanians advanced into Kampala on 10 April, with the 208th Brigade attacking from Entebbe. The city was taken with minimal resistance, with most of the Libyans having evacuated.

== Background ==
In 1971 Idi Amin launched a military coup that overthrew the President of Uganda, Milton Obote, precipitating a deterioration of relations with the neighbouring state of Tanzania. Amin installed himself as president and ruled the country under a repressive dictatorship. In October 1978 Amin launched an invasion of Tanzania. Tanzania halted the assault, mobilised anti-Amin opposition groups, and launched a counter-offensive. The President of Tanzania, Julius Nyerere, told foreign diplomats that he did not intend to depose Amin, but only "teach him a lesson". The claim was not believed; Nyerere despised Amin, and he made statements to some of his colleagues about overthrowing him. The Tanzanian Government also felt that the northern border would not be secure unless the threat presented by Amin was eliminated. After initial advances into Ugandan territory, Major General David Msuguri was appointed commander of the Tanzania People's Defence Force (TPDF)'s 20th Division and ordered to push further into the country.

On 24 February 1979 the TPDF seized Masaka. Nyerere originally planned to halt his forces there and allow Ugandan exiles to attack Kampala, the Ugandan capital, and overthrow Amin. He feared that scenes of Tanzanian troops occupying the city would reflect poorly on the country's image abroad. In March President Muammar Gaddafi of Libya, an ally of Amin, attempted to stem the advance by sending an ultimatum to Nyerere, demanding that he withdraw his forces in 24 hours or face the opposition of Libyan troops (which were already present in Uganda). Nyerere rejected the threat in a radio broadcast, announcing that Libya's entry into the war did not change the Tanzanian Government's view of Amin. Ugandan rebel forces did not have the strength to defeat Libyan units, so Nyerere decided to use the TPDF to take Kampala. Though Libyan forces had been defeated in a clash at Lukaya, Gaddafi sent large amounts of military equipment and 2,000 members of the People's Militia to Amin's aid. Many of the soldiers were told that they were only being deployed for joint-exercises and not for combat. The personnel and materiel were brought into Entebbe's international airport in a regular airlift. Much of the supplies and military hardware were stockpiled there because Ugandan forces did not have the logistical capability to efficiently distribute them. Entebbe, Uganda's fourth largest town, was also home to the State House, the official presidential residence. Due to the approaching Tanzanian force, Amin's family had been evacuated, but it was still used for government purposes.

On 25 March Amin ordered the Entebbe airport closed to civilian traffic. In retaliation for a Libyan airstrike on their territory, the Tanzanians launched a series of sorties against Ugandan targets. Several jets raided the Entebbe airport, strafing the tarmac and setting part of the terminal on fire, but failing to cause enough damage to halt the Libyan airlift.

== Prelude ==
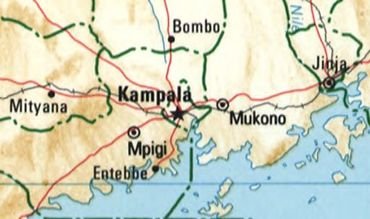
Map of Entebbe and surrounding locales

In early April Tanzanian forces began to concentrate their efforts on weakening the Ugandan position in Kampala. Tanzanian commanders had originally assumed that Amin would station the bulk of his forces in the capital, and their initial plans called for a direct attack on the city. But from the high ground in Mpigi they could see the Entebbe peninsula, where there was a high volume of Libyan air traffic and a large contingent of Ugandan and Libyan soldiers. If the TPDF seized Kampala before securing the town of Entebbe, TPDF positions in Kampala would be vulnerable to a flanking attack. Taking Entebbe would cut off Uganda's Libyan reinforcements and permit an assault on the capital from the south. Thus, Msuguri ordered the 208th Brigade under Mwita Marwa to seize the peninsula. An understrength battalion led by Lieutenant Colonel Ben Msuya secured Kanjasi, cutting off Entebbe from Kampala.

A large contingent of Libyan troops were entrenched around Entebbe, while a smaller number of Ugandans garrisoned the airfield. The TPDF set up 130 mm (5.1 in) M-46 artillery emplacements and subjected the town to a light (several shells a day), three-day bombardment in hopes of frightening members of the garrison and convincing them to retreat. Amin was at the Entebbe State House when a shell landed in the parking lot. Feeling he was being personally targeted, he immediately ran to his helicopter and flew to Kampala. His departure instigated the flight of many Ugandan troops, who raided the airport's duty-free shop before they left, while the Libyans remained. Libyan aircraft evacuated high-ranking officials of the Amin regime. A Ugandan distress call was sent out over radio, requesting extraction via helicopter. Entebbe was encircled on 6 April, and that evening the bombardment was intensified, with several hundred artillery rounds fired.

== Battle ==
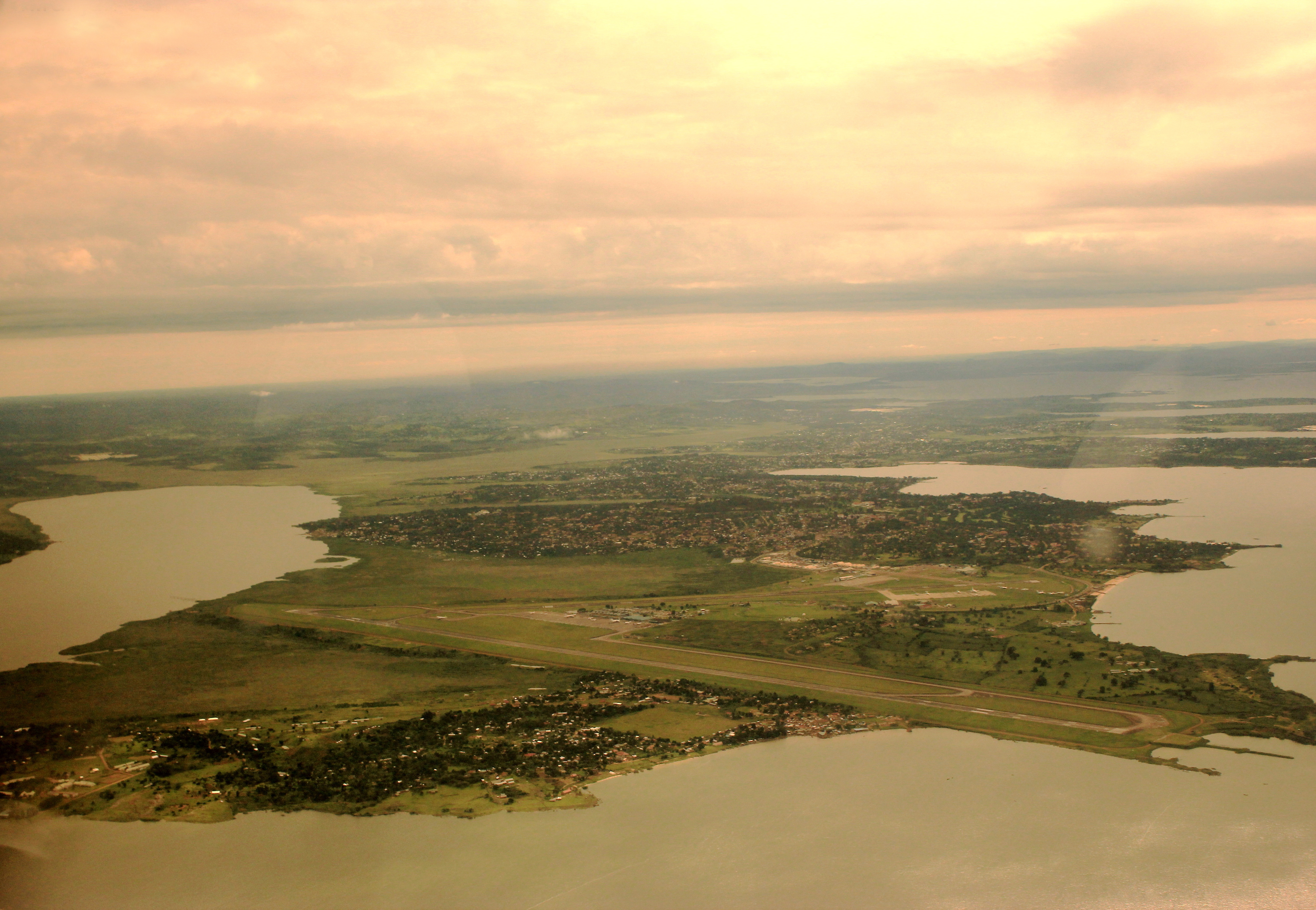
A view of Entebbe from the air

The 208th Brigade advanced on Entebbe on the morning of 7 April. They established a series of checkpoints along the way, and destroyed a Libyan Land Rover with eight occupants as it drove towards Mpigi. Two Ugandan platoons equipped with 106 mm (4.2 in) recoilless rifles and 81 mm (3.19 in) mortars put up opposition at Kitubulu, but were defeated. At 10:00 a Libyan Lockheed C-130 Hercules (LARAF C-130H 116) landed at the airport to attempt an evacuation. It picked up 30 Libyan soldiers, but was destroyed by an RPG-7 fired by an advance team of Tanzanian soldiers at the edge of the runway as it was taking off. All but one of the 40 people on board were killed. No further attempts at air evacuation were made. As the fighting intensified, many Libyan soldiers attempted to evacuate to Kampala. Most did not know how to get to the capital, and began asking civilians for help by exclaiming "Kampala" (none of the Libyans knew Swahili and few could speak English). Some civilians offered to assist them and instead led them to TPDF units. Others, believing that the Libyans were in possession of large amounts of cash, killed them and searched their bodies.

A single Libyan convoy of two armoured cars and several trucks was able to reach the Kampala road and drove towards the capital. According to TPDF Major Salim Onwu, the Tanzanians expected this convoy, as a prisoner had revealed that the Libyans were planning a larger breakout. Eight kilometres (4.97 miles) down the road where the thoroughfare cut through a hill, a TPDF ambush was set up by Lieutenant Colonel Salim Hassan Boma, who had split his 400 men on the rear face of either side of the hill. When the Libyans arrived they halted their convoy. Their commanders, suspecting a trap, consulted each other and had one of the armoured cars open fire on the hillsides with a machine gun. When the action elicited no response, the armoured cars drove down the road to the other side of the hill. Major Onwu ordered his men to not respond and be still. Feeling they were not in danger, the Libyan commanders ordered their trucks to follow them. As they were passing through, Boma ordered his men to attack. The Tanzanians charged over the hillsides and opened fire, quickly setting the armoured cars ablaze. The clash lasted 10 minutes and resulted in the deaths of 65 to 79 Libyan soldiers. Despite the ambush's success, TPDF soldiers later stated that many Libyans had actually managed to escape from the destroyed convoy into the nearby bush.

In Entebbe, the TPDF searched each building at the airport to clear out resistance. There was little fighting in the town, as most of the conflict had occurred as the TPDF intercepted Libyan units attempting to escape on outlying roads. Boma's battalion secured Entebbe late in the afternoon. Over 300 Libyans were killed, over 40 were captured, (Note: The New African reported that 49 Libyans were captured. The Daily Monitor stated that 83 Libyans were taken prisoner.) and several dozen were wounded. Large stockpiles of Libyan weapons were seized, including three BM-21 rocket launchers, as was a battery of Ugandan 122 mm (4.8 in) guns. A dozen Ugandan Army Air Force (UAAF) MiG fighters and one Uganda Airlines Boeing 707 were disabled in the attack and left on the runway. Nine or ten fighters were deemed functional enough to be seized as war prizes. (Note: Avirgan and Honey stated that nine MiG-21s were seized. Cooper wrote that the Tanzanians confiscated two or three MiG-17s and seven MiG-21s.) They were flown to Mwanza, though one crashed on landing. The next morning the TPDF found a large number of UAAF personnel at a church, wearing civilian clothes, ready to surrender. Journalists Tony Avirgan and Martha Honey state that there were 200 of them. According to Isaac Dakka, the Anglican chaplain at Katabi Barracks, there were 365 of them. Dakka stated that during the battle he had suggested that the contingent surrender and that the officers—including the operational commander, Lieutenant Colonel Cyril Orambi—concurred. They ordered their men to return their weapons to the armoury and communicated their intentions to Marwa. Orambi personally surrendered to Marwa, and the Ugandans were detained in a fenced enclosure.

== Aftermath ==
The dead Libyans were buried in mass graves. The dozens of wounded Libyans were evacuated to Mulago Hospital before being taken to Nakasongola Air Base and repatriated. Those taken prisoner by the TPDF were released nine months later. The captured UAAF personnel were taken to a prison camp in Tanzania. According to Dakka, several of the prisoners were summarily executed during the journey (random Ugandan civilians being abducted to replace their numbers) and many were tortured at the camp. The remaining Libyan soldiers withdrew to Kampala to prepare for its defence with Ugandan units. Their morale was extremely low. The TPDF moved its operating headquarters to Entebbe and it remained there for the rest of the force's service in Uganda. Major Salim Onwu was appointed head of the Entebbe region.

Libyan firepower and air support should have allowed its dug-in troops to hold the airfield almost indefinitely against the lightly armed Tanzanians. Instead, the Libyans broke under the first TPDF infantry assaults.

— Intelligence analyst Kenneth M. Pollack

American intelligence analyst Kenneth M. Pollack attributed the Libyans' defeat at Entebbe to their inadequate training and low morale. The battle marked the de facto end of the Uganda Army Air Force. Most of its aircraft were destroyed or captured, and the Air Force personnel that managed to escape to the air fields in Jinja and Nakasongola spread panic among the Ugandan forces there. Mass desertions and defections were the consequence, leaving the acting commander of the UAAF, Andrew Mukooza, with no means to continue the fight. (Note: Mukooza had fled Entebbe via helicopter on 6 April.) Furthermore, a number of Uganda Army units mutinied when ordered by the government to launch a counter-attack against Entebbe, and seized control of several localities throughout Uganda. Most notably, the army forces at Tororo defected directly to the Ugandan insurgents who were allied with Tanzania, allowing them to occupy the town without resistance. Entebbe's capture also triggered the flight of hundreds of Ugandan soldiers from Kampala.

The Entebbe airport was left partially destroyed by the battle. Tanzanian soldiers broke into the airport's safe, with one "half colonel" reportedly stealing millions of Ugandan shilling (worth about $55,000 at the time). Local residents looted abandoned stores and homes in the town, while TPDF soldiers ransacked the Entebbe State House. They dug trenches and established anti-aircraft emplacements around the residence. On the morning of 8 April Tanzanian officers held a briefing in the State House for their attack on Kampala. Nyerere requested that his commanders leave the eastern road from the city leading to Jinja clear so Libyan troops could evacuate. He thought that by allowing them to escape, Libya could avoid humiliation and quietly withdraw from the war. Nyerere also feared that further conflict with Libyan troops would incite Afro-Arab tensions and invite the armed belligerence of other Arab states. He sent a message to Gaddafi explaining his decision, saying that the Libyans could be airlifted out of Uganda unopposed from the airstrip in Jinja. Most of them promptly vacated the capital through the open corridor to Kenya and Ethiopia, where they were repatriated. The 208th Brigade moved out of Entebbe for Kampala, leaving behind a single battalion to guard the airport. The TPDF advanced into the city on 10 April, with the 208th Brigade attacking from Entebbe. It was taken with minimal resistance. Combat operations in Uganda continued until 3 June, when Tanzanian forces reached the Sudanese border and eliminated the last resistance. The TPDF withdrew from the country in 1981.
