= Uganda Air Force =

Air warfare branch of Uganda's military

Uganda People's Defence Force Air Forces
- Founded: 1964 (Uganda's first air force); 2005 (current air force)
- Country: Uganda
- Type: Air force
- Role: Aerial warfare
- Size: 1200 personnel
- Part of: Uganda People's Defence Force
- Headquarters: Entebbe
- Engagements: Uganda–Tanzania War; Ugandan Bush War; First Liberian Civil War; Sierra Leone Civil War

Commanders
- Commander-in-Chief: President Yoweri Museveni
- Chief of Air Staff: Colonel Emmanuel Kwihangana

Insignia
- Roundel

- Fin flash

- Flag

Aircraft flown
- Attack: Su-30
- Fighter: Su-30
- Helicopter: Bell 206, Mil Mi-17, Bell UH-1
- Attack helicopter: Mil Mi-24, Mil Mi-28
- Trainer: L-39 Albatross
- Transport: Cessna 208 Caravan, King Air 350

Uganda People's Defence Force Air Force, more commonly known as the Ugandan Air Force, is a branch of the Uganda People's Defence Force. Its headquarters are located at Entebbe, Uganda. The current air force commander is Charles Lutaaya, while Emmanuel Kwihangana serves as chief of air staff.

== History ==
=== Uganda Army Air Force ===
The Ugandan Air Force traces its history to 1964, when the country's first air force was established with Israeli aid. This military branch was officially called "Uganda Army Air Force" (UAAF). Its first aircraft was of Israeli origin, and its initial pilots trained in Israel. As Uganda's government forged closer links with the Eastern Bloc, the UAAF began to acquire more aircraft as well as support in training from the Soviet Union, Czechoslovakia, and Libya. Israeli aid initially continued as well. After Idi Amin seized power during the 1971 Ugandan coup d'état, the Uganda Army, including its air force, were further expanded. At the same time, corruption and infighting increased, while foreign aid began to decline, reducing the UAAF's ability to operate.

Much of the UAAF was destroyed in Operation Entebbe in 1976, although it was subsequently rebuilt with mainly Libyan and Soviet support.

By late 1978, the UAAF was commanded by Lieutenant Colonel Christopher Gore and consisted of several dozen MiG-21MFs, MiG-21UMs, MiG-17s, and MiG-15UTIs. Some of the available aircraft were not combat-ready, however, and were abandoned during the Uganda–Tanzania War without seeing action. The lack of spare parts especially affected the Mig-15s and MiG-17s. The UAAF was split into three fighter squadrons. However the force was effectively wiped out during the 1978/1979 air campaign of the Uganda–Tanzania War. Its pilots and technicians scattered, many fleeing abroad; its aircraft was lost or taken by the Tanzanians.

=== Air forces from 1979 ===
After Idi Amin had been overthrown and the UAAF's been destroyed during the Uganda-Tanzania War, there were repeated attempts by the next Ugandan governments to organize a new air force. The new national military, generally known as Uganda National Liberation Army (UNLA), acquired a few helicopters and organized a small air wing. A further restoration remained impossible due to lack of funding as well as renewed internal conflict, as the country plunged into a civil war known as Ugandan Bush War.

The Bush War was won by the rebel National Resistance Movement (NRM) in 1986, resulting in the organization of yet another national military. The NRM government began rebuilding the air force, but the "Ugandan People's Defence Air Force" remained extremely small until the 1990s, counting just 100 personnel by 1994.

=== Modern air force ===
The modern air force, in its current form, was established in 2005 by the Defence forces Act. It was formed as a statutory institute and service under the umbrella of the Uganda Defence Forces.

In 2011, Emmanuel Tumusiime-Mutebile, the central bank governor, caused large volatility in the Ugandan shilling when he told the Financial Times that President Museveni had ignored technical advice against using Uganda's small foreign exchange reserves to buy new Sukhoi Su-30 fighter aircraft.

In June 2022, Uganda took delivery of at least three Mi-28N Havoc attack helicopters from Russia.

== Mission of the UPDF Air Force ==
The UPDF Air Force's mission is to defend the country's air space, and provide support to the army's operations. Other missions include:

- Participation in regional peace missions
- Provide support to the army
- Building of a standardized, well-trained officer and enlisted corps capable of contributing to the fulfillment of the Uganda Air Force's mission
- To bolster Uganda's strategic defence power by deterring potential threats and establishing superiority in combat

== Base and training facilities ==
The Ugandan Air Force training facility is located at Gulu Air Base, where pilots undergo a five year training program. The Gulu airport is controlled by the Air wing of the Uganda People Defence Forces. The Gulu airport is in the Gulu District.

=== Air base upgrading ===
As of 14 November 2019, the President of Uganda has set up a committee to upgrade the Gulu Airport to international standards; the construction will determine the features and installation of aircraft hangars, access routes, vehicles, water treatment systems, ground markings, parking areas, and control towers, according to the President.

In late March 2020, an upgrade of six training aircraft was completed at the Gulu Air Base by Ukrainian owned defense conglomerate UkrOboronProm (UOP), who had provided approximately 14 personnel including pilots, engineers, and designers. These upgrades began in 2018. The upgraded aircraft were eight Aero L-39 Albatros; a training and light attack jet. Upgrades included overhauling their AI-25TL Turbofan engines, bringing them to AI-25TLSh Standards, modernizing radio and navigation equipment, and installing solid-state BUR-4-1 flight data recorders.

During the "pass out" ceremony of the 2020 pilot graduation held at Gulu Airport, the President of Uganda had pledged to begin the construction of 30,000 housing units countrywide to solve the UPDF housing shortage in the country.

== Service contract ==
In March 2022, the UPDF Air Force signed a memorandum of understanding (MOU) with Government of India, for the latter to maintain and service Uganda's Russian-made multirole Su-30MK2 fighter jets. The work will be carried out by Hindustan Aeronautics Limited (HAL), based in Bengaluru, India. HAL is fully owned by the Indian government. The agreement was signed at the Embassy of India to Uganda, in Uganda's capital city, Kampala.

== Other affiliation ==
The UPDAF commended the Lord's Resistance Army Disarmament and Northern Uganda Recovery Act signed by President Barack Obama, leading to cooperation between the Ugandan People Defence Force, Ugandan People's Defence Air Force, and Air Forces Africa for establishing good partnerships and military engagement. In 2018 the UPDAF promoted 107 soldiers to commissioned and higher ranks.

== Air force commanders ==
=== Uganda Army Air Force ===
- Wilson Toko (died 1973)
- Smuts Guweddeko (1973–1974)
- Zeddy Maruru (1974–1975)
- Idi Amin (1975 – ?)
- Godwin Sule (acting, c. 1976)
- Christopher Gore (1978 – 1979)
- Andrew Mukooza (1979)

=== UNLA air wing ===
- Peter Oringi (1982 – ?)

=== UPDF Air Force ===
- Samuel Turyagyenda (2013 – 2017)
- Charles Lutaaya (2017 – present)

== Inventory ==
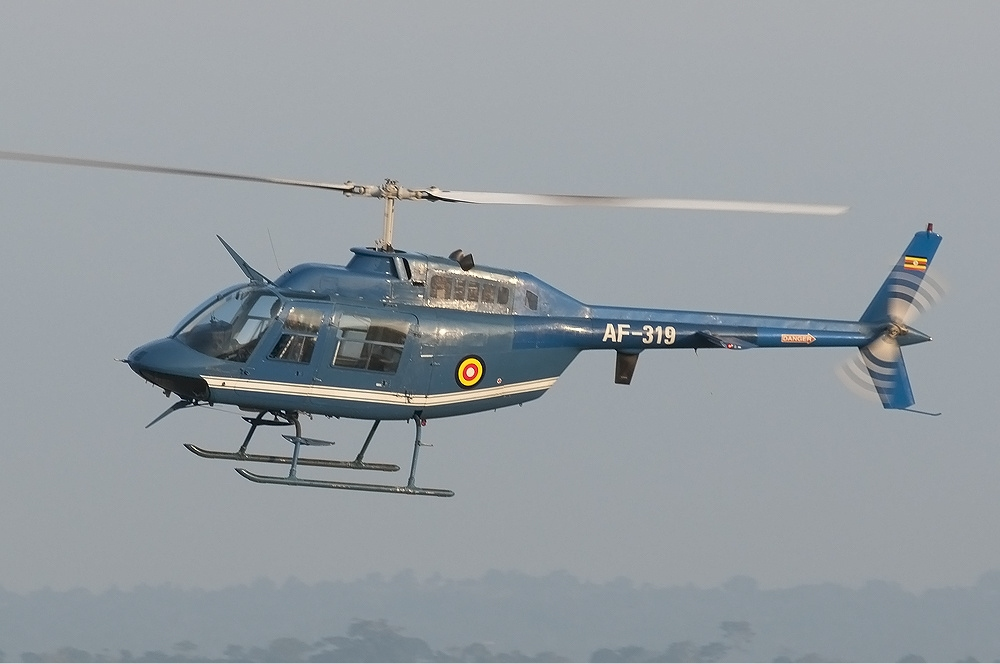
Bell 206B JetRanger II of the Uganda Air Force

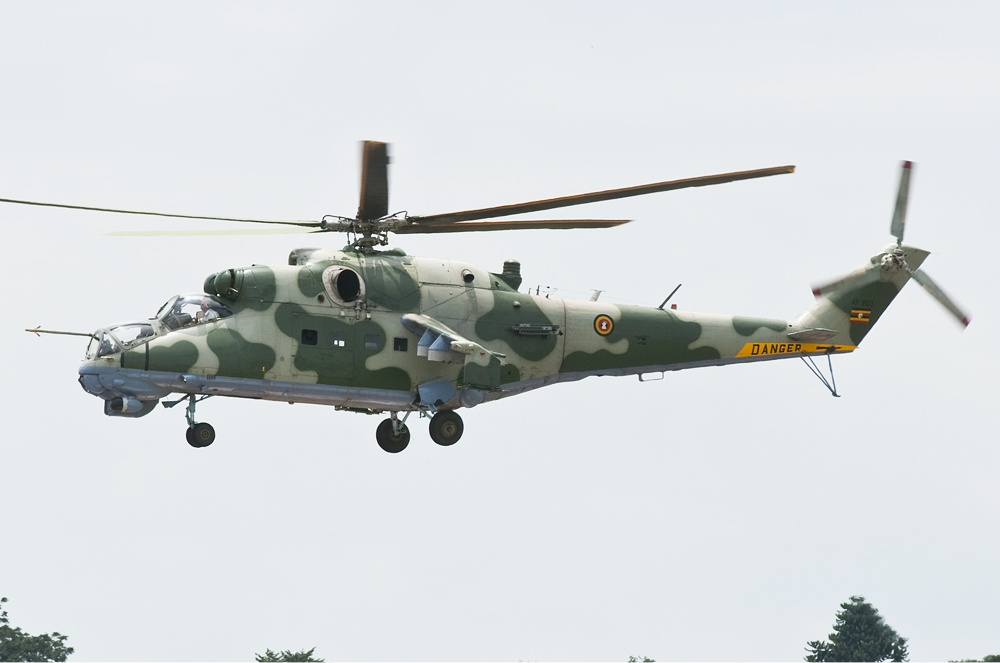
Uganda People's Defence Force Air Wing Mil Mi-24V

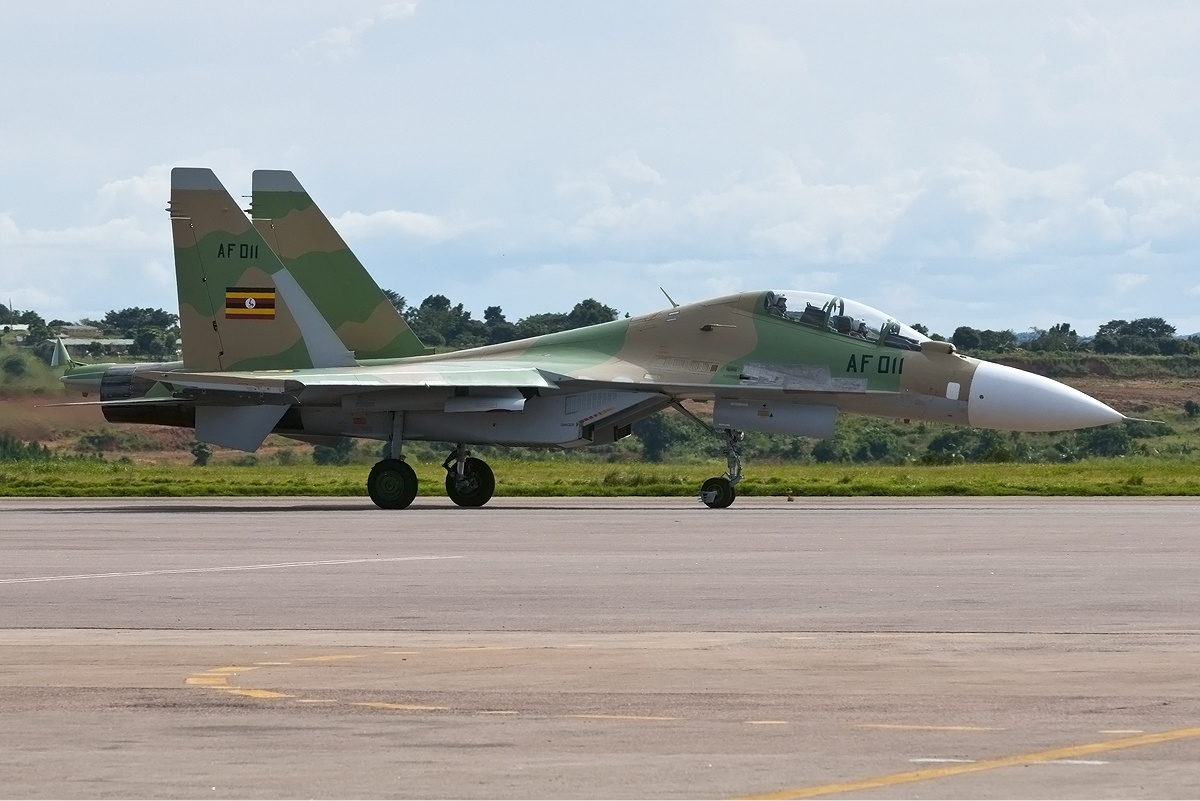
Uganda People's Defence Force Air Wing Sukhoi Su-30MK2

=== Current inventory ===
Aircraft	Origin	Type	Variant	In service	Notes
Combat aircraft
Sukhoi Su-30	Russia	Multirole		6	
Transport
Cessna 208 Caravan	United States	Utility		2	
Beechcraft Super King Air	United States	Utility	King Air 350	1	
Helicopters
Bell 206 JetRanger	United States	Utility		5	
Mil Mi-17	Russia	Utility		10	
Mil Mi-24	Soviet Union	Attack	Mi-35	5	1 crashed 2 July 2025.
Mil Mi-28	Russia	Attack		4	2 on order
Bell UH-1 Iroquois	United States	Utility	UH-1H	5	
Trainer aircraft
Aero L-39 Albatros	Czechoslovakia	Jet trainer	L-39ZA	12	

=== Retired aircraft ===
Retired aircraft include Bell Model 214ST, MiG-21, SF.260.

== Ranks ==
=== Commissioned officer ranks ===
The rank insignia of commissioned officers.

Rank group	General / flag officers				Senior officers			Junior officers
Ugandan Air Force
Ugandan Air Force	General	Lieutenant general	Major general	Brigadier general	Colonel	Lieutenant colonel	Major	Captain	Lieutenant	Second lieutenant

=== Other ranks ===
The rank insignia of non-commissioned officers and enlisted personnel.

Rank group	Senior NCOs				Junior NCOs		Enlisted
Ugandan Air Force							No insignia
Ugandan Air Force	Warrant officer class 1	Warrant officer class 2	Staff sergeant	Sergeant	Corporal	Lance corporal	Private (or equivalent)
