= Mvomero District =

District in Morogoro Region, Tanzania

Coordinates: 6.3°S 37.45°E

Mvomero
- District
- Wilaya ya Mvomero, Mkoa wa Morogoro
- Mvomero District of Morogoro Region
- Country: Tanzania
- Region: Morogoro Region

Area
  - Total: 6,631 km^{2} (2,560 sq mi)

Population (2022)
  - Total: 421,741
  - Density: 63.60/km^{2} (164.7/sq mi)

Mvomero is one of the six districts of the Morogoro Region of Tanzania. It is bordered to the north by the Tanga Region, to the northeast by the Pwani Region, to the east and southeast by Morogoro Rural District and Morogoro Urban District and to the west by Kilosa District.

According to the 2022 Tanzania National Census, the population of the Mvomero District was 421,741.

== Wards ==
The Mvomero District is administratively divided into 30 wards:

- Bunduki
- Luale
- Diongoya
- Doma
- Hembeti
- Kanga
- Kibati
- Kikeo
- Kweuma
- Langali
- Maskati
- Melela
- Mhonda
- Mlali
- Mtibwa
- Mkindo
- Mvomero
- Mzumbe
- Nyandira
- Tchenzema
- Mgeta
- Msongozi
- Mangaye
- Homboza
- Lubungo
- Dakawa
- Kinda
- Pemba
- Mziha
- Sungaji

== Sources ==
- Mvomero District Homepage for the 2002 Tanzania National Census
