= Morogoro Urban District =

Morogoro Urban District Wilaya ya Morogoro Mjini
- District
- Morogoro Municipal of Morogoro Region
- Coordinates: 06°49′20″S 037°39′55″E
- Country: Tanzania
- Region: Morogoro Region

Population (2012)
  - Total: 315,866

Morogoro Urban District (Swahili: Wilaya ya Morogoro Mjini) is one of the six districts of the Morogoro Region of Tanzania. It contains the city Morogoro, capital of the Morogoro Region, and no villages. Morogoro Urban District covers 260 square kilometres (100 sq mi). It is bordered to the east and south by the Morogoro Rural District and to the north and west by Mvomero District

As of 2012, the population of the Morogoro Urban District was 315,866.

== Administrative subdivisions ==
=== Constituencies ===
For parliamentary elections, Tanzania is divided into constituencies. As of the 2010 elections Morogoro Urban District had four constituencies:

- Morogoro-Kusini-Mashariki Constituency
- Morogoro Kusini Constituency
- Morogoro Mjini Constituency
- Mvomero Constituency

=== Divisions ===
Morogoro Urban District has six administrative division.

=== Wards ===
The Morogoro Urban District is administratively divided into twenty nine wards:

- Bigwa
- Boma (English Meaning: headquarters)
- Chamwino
- Kauzeni
- Kichangani
- Kihonda
- Kihonda Magorofani
- Kilakala (Luguru word meaning:Kilchoungua in SWAHILI)
- Kingo
- Kingolwira
- Kiwanja cha Ndege
- Luhungo
- Lukobe
- Mafiga
- Mafisa
- Magadu
- Mazimbu
- Mbuyuni
- Mindu
- Mji Kuu (English Meaning: center city)
- Mji Mpya (English Meaning: new city)
- Mkundi
- Mlimani (English Meaning: on the mountain)
- Mwembesongo
- Mzinga
- Sabasaba (English Meaning: 7/7 or July 7th)
- Sultan Area
- Tungi
- Uwanja wa Taifa

== See also ==
- Mazimbu Graves
- Morogoro Rural District
