= Operation Dada Idi =

1979 military offensive in Tanzania

- Part of the Uganda–Tanzania War
| Date | March – early April 1979 |
| Location | Central Uganda |
| Result | Tanzanian victory |
| Territorial changes | Mpigi and surroundings of Kampala and Entebbe are occupied by Tanzanian forces |

Belligerents
| Tanzania (Uganda) Ugandan rebels | Uganda; Libya; Palestine Liberation Organisation |

Commanders and leaders
| David Musuguri | (Uganda) Idi Amin (Uganda) Yusuf Gowon (Uganda) Ali Fadhul (Palestine) Mahmoud Da'as |

Units involved
| 201st Brigade; 207th Brigade; 208th Brigade | (Uganda) Malire Battalion (History of Libya under Muammar Gaddafi) Libyan Armed Forces (Palestine) Fatah |

Strength
| | c. 3,000 Ugandan soldiers Several Libyan soldiers and Palestinian guerrillas |

Casualties and losses
| Unknown | Many Ugandans and Libyans killed Several tanks, APCs, transport vehicles, and artillery pieces captured |

Operation Dada Idi was a military offensive conducted by Tanzania against the Ugandan government of Idi Amin and its Libyan and Palestinian allies in March and April 1979 during the Uganda–Tanzania War. The attack took place amid the disintegration of the Uganda Army, and thus encountered only sporadic and disorganised resistance. The operation resulted in the Tanzanian capture of Mpigi and several other locations around Kampala.

Idi Amin had seized power in Uganda in 1971 and established a repressive dictatorship. Seven years later he attempted to invade neighbouring Tanzania to the south. The attack was repulsed, and Tanzanian President Julius Nyerere ordered a counter-attack into Ugandan territory. Attempts by Uganda and its foreign allies to stop the Tanzanian advance failed. After the Battle of Lukaya on 10–11 March 1979, the Tanzania People's Defence Force (TPDF) began to approach Uganda's capital Kampala, prompting Amin and his foreign allies to fortify the strategic location of Mpigi which was located between Lukaya and Kampala. As the Uganda Army was in disarray after its repeated defeats, the pro-Amin troops only offered sporadic resistance in several small-scale clashes around Mpigi.

After taking several positions around the town, the TPDF advanced into Mpigi on 28 March 1979, encountering no further opposition as the garrison had fled. Historian Richard J. Reid argued that the confrontation at Mpigi constituted "Amin's last stand". The Tanzanians consequently set up artillery to shell Kampala as well as the crucial airport at Entebbe. In the following days, the TPDF defeated further Ugandan and Libyan contingents and gradually secured Mpigi's surroundings. This allowed the Tanzanians to capture Entebbe on 7 April, followed by Kampala on 11 April 1979.

== Background ==
Map of the battles of the Uganda–Tanzania War

In 1971 Colonel Idi Amin launched a military coup that overthrew the President of Uganda, Milton Obote, precipitating a deterioration of relations with neighbouring Tanzania. Tanzanian President Julius Nyerere had close ties with Obote and had supported his socialist orientation. Amin installed himself as President of Uganda and ruled the country under a repressive dictatorship. Nyerere withheld diplomatic recognition of the new government and offered asylum to Obote and his supporters. He tacitly supported a failed attempt by Obote to overthrow Amin in 1972, and after a brief border conflict he and Amin signed a peace accord. Nevertheless, relations between the two presidents remained tense, and Amin made repeated threats to invade Tanzania.

Uganda's economy languished under Amin's corrupt rule, and instability manifested in the armed forces. In late October 1978, Ugandan troops invaded Tanzanian border areas under unclear circumstances. On 1 November Amin announced that he was annexing the Kagera Salient in northern Tanzania. Tanzania halted the sudden invasion, mobilised anti-Amin opposition groups, and launched a counteroffensive. Nyerere told foreign diplomats that he did not intend to depose Amin, but only "teach him a lesson". The claim was not believed; Nyerere despised Amin, and he made statements to some of his colleagues about overthrowing him. The Tanzanian Government also felt that the northern border would not be secure unless the threat presented by Amin was eliminated. After the Tanzania People's Defence Force (TPDF) retook northern Tanzania, Major General David Musuguri was appointed commander of the 20th Division and ordered to push into Ugandan territory. In-mid February, Libyan troops were flown into Entebbe to assist the Uganda Army. Libyan President Muammar Gaddafi felt that Uganda, a Muslim state in his view, was being threatened by a Christian army, and wished to halt the Tanzanians.

On 24 February 1979 the TPDF seized Masaka. Nyerere originally planned to halt his forces there and allow Ugandan exiles to attack Kampala, the Ugandan capital, and overthrow Amin. He feared that scenes of Tanzanian troops occupying the city would reflect poorly on the country's image abroad. However, Ugandan rebel forces did not have the strength to defeat the incoming Libyan units, so Nyerere decided to use the TPDF to take the capital. Around this time, the Uganda Army showed first signs of disintegrating, as various high-ranking commanders disappeared or were murdered. One Ugandan soldier stated in an interview with Drum, a South African magazine, that "the situation is worsening every day and therefore our days are numbered". Meanwhile, the TPDF's 20th Division prepared to advance from Masaka to Kampala.

== Prelude ==
The pro-Amin forces, consisting of Ugandan, Libyan, and Palestine Liberation Organisation (PLO) troops, launched a major counter-offensive at Lukaya on 10 March 1979. Amin hoped that this operation could push the Tanzanians out of Uganda. Although the initial attack proceeded well, the TPDF counter-attacked on 11 March. The surprised pro-Amin troops were overwhelmed and decisively defeated, resulting in complete rout. This battle completely demoralised the Uganda Army, causing many officers as well as soldiers to desert.

Although the Uganda Army disintegrated after the Battle of Lukaya, Amin's regime was not yet defeated. He was still supported by Gaddafi who increased his military commitment after Lukaya by sending large amounts of military equipment and 2,000 members of the People's Militia to Amin's aid. Many of the soldiers were told that they were only being deployed for joint-exercises and not for combat. The personnel and materiel were brought into Entebbe's international airport in a regular airlift. Much of the supplies and military hardware were stockpiled there because Ugandan forces did not have the logistical capability to efficiently distribute them. Foreign observers such as Kenyan Attorney General Charles Njonjo publicly stated that the Ugandan government could still maintain power thanks to this significant Libyan support. However, the incoming Libyan aid had no immediate military effect, as Ugandan forces did not have the logistical capability to properly distribute the new supplies and military hardware.

== Offensive ==
=== Tanzanian capture of Mpigi ===
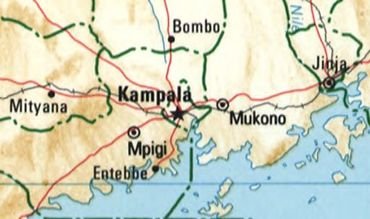
Map of Mpigi and surrounding locales

The Tanzanian-led forces did not pause after their victory at Lukaya, and instead renewed their advance toward Kampala. This offensive was code-named "Operation Dada Idi", and involved the 201st, 207th and 208th Brigades. To secure the way to Kampala, the Tanzanians aimed at capturing Mpigi. Diplomats reported that Amin initially planned to make a defensive "last stand" at this strategically important town close to Entebbe and 30 miles (48 km) south of Kampala. However, any attempts at organising a proper defence were hampered by the chaos among Amin's forces. The area between Lukaya and Kampala was "crowded" with Ugandan and Libyan troops who mostly tried to flee to the capital. Many Ugandan soldiers went rogue or deserted, often trying to flee north and then across the border to Zaire or Sudan.

With the pro-Amin forces disorganised, the initial Tanzanian advance after Lukaya encountered no resistance. TPDF soldiers chanced upon a bus carrying Ugandan soldiers at Buwama which they took intact, while twenty Ugandans were killed as they tried to run away on foot. The Tanzanians eventually rested at a Catholic mission at Mtola Maria, where some of the exhausted troops played the Tanzanian national hymn, Mungu ibariki Afrika, at the church organ. Around this time, Major General Musuguri was provided with intelligence reports according to which Mpigi had been garrisoned and fortified by "a strong Amin force". Historian Richard J. Reid stated that the Ugandan President managed to gather around 3,000 Uganda Army soldiers, mostly of Sudanese origin, and a smaller number of Libyan and PLO troops at the town. The PLO forces under Mahmoud Da'as reportedly played a major role in the attempts to set up defenses around Kampala. Musuguri consequently ordered the 207th and 208th Brigades to directly advance on Mpigi, while the 201st Brigade would circumvent the town to the west, cutting off the road and railway line from Fort Portal to Kampala. In anticipation of the attack, Ugandan forces took complete control of Mpigi while the civilian population evacuated.

As the Tanzanians secured the areas around Mpigi, they clashed with bands of pro-Amin forces for a few days. Mostly hindered by rain and difficult terrain in its advance, the TPDF easily killed several groups of Uganda Army soldiers, capturing several tanks, armoured personnel carriers, artillery pieces, Land Rovers, and buses. Meanwhile, the 201st Brigade advanced down the Mityana road. They encountered a Libyan camp at a coffee farm close to Mityana, overrunning it and killing 30 enemy soldiers. On 19 March the brigade occupied the village of Kabolasoke. A 5-man team of sappers led by Lieutenant Alfred Marwa was dispatched to the Matonga area to mine the Maddu-Mityana road. While completing this task the group was warned by a passing civilian that a Uganda Army vehicle was approaching their position from Mubende. The Tanzanians laid an ambush and opened fire on the car as it approached. Its occupants—a Ugandan lieutenant colonel and his four bodyguards—dove out and managed to escape into the bush unharmed, but the sappers seized their vehicle.

According to an exiled, unidentified "high Ugandan official", several members of the Ugandan high command urged Amin to step down in the second half of March. The President refused to do so, calling the officers cowards and declaring "If you don't want to fight, I'll do it myself." He consequently fired Army Chief of Staff Yusuf Gowon, and appointed Ali Fadhul as replacement. At some point, a Tanzanian reconnaissance team spotted Amin as he was arriving at Mpigi in a Mercedes-Benz, where he subsequently spoke to soldiers at a rally. When the TPDF frontline commanders were informed, they refrained from targeting the Ugandan President, as they had no desire to see his possible replacement surrender early and prevent the TPDF from capturing Kampala in battle. On 26 March, the TPDF cut the road between Kampala and Entebbe, preventing further reinforcements and materiel from reaching the Ugandan capital.

At some point, the defenders at Mpigi melted away, looting the town before fleeing to Kampala. The Tanzanians encountered no resistance when they occupied the settlement on 28 March. (Note: According to journalist Martha Honey, Mpigi was captured on 22 March.) The Ugandans continued looting as they fled, stripping displaced persons of their belongings and searching for vehicles to hasten their retreat. Historian Richard J. Reid argued that the confrontation at Mpigi constituted "Amin's last stand". The TPDF set up artillery at Mpigi, and began to shell Entebbe and Kampala. On the same day, Radio Uganda and exile sources stated that Mityana had fallen to the TPDF. At some point in late March, Tanzanians and Ugandan insurgents killed about two dozen Libyans in a clash at King's College Budo; the TPDF consequently occupied the college grounds to house some of its troops.

=== Fighting in the surroundings of Kampala and Entebbe ===
By late March, diplomats estimated that just two Uganda Army battalions counting 2,500 soldiers remained loyal to Amin. Regardless, the Ugandan President and his high command prepared for a "showdown" north of Mpigi, clearing the area of civilians. According to journalist Jonathan C.R., Amin committed his "praetorian guard" of "Nubian mercenaries and his own Kakwa tribesmen" to stop the TPDF advance. This force reportedly included the Malire Battalion. There were reports about clashes and shootouts in Kampala, possibly involving mutinous Uganda Army troops.

At the same time, the Tanzanian commanders changed their original attack plans. Instead of striking at Kampala, they opted to attack Entebbe first, having observed a high volume of Libyan air traffic and a large contingent of Ugandan and Libyan soldiers at the peninsula from the high ground in Mpigi. If the TPDF seized Kampala before securing the town of Entebbe, TPDF positions in Kampala would be vulnerable to a flanking attack. To support the assault on Entebbe, the TPDF occupied Katende near Mpigi where it deployed a company of tanks and an artillery battery. The Tanzanians then advanced south, overwhelming Ugandan and Libyan troops at Nakawuka, killing thirteen. The Uganda Army and Libyan force launched a counter-attack with tanks, BM-21 Grad multiple rocket launchers, and anti-tank rifles on 4 April. The operation took place at a tea or coffee plantation near Lubowa, about 5 miles (8.0 km) south of Kampala. This assault quickly faltered in the face of heavy Tanzanian resistance, causing the Ugandans to flee while leaving most of their equipment behind. The Libyans reportedly suffered heavy losses. Afterwards, TPDF-led forces occupied Makindye, 2 miles (3.2 km) south of Kampala.

Also on 4 April, Amin organised a four‐member war planning committee consisting of the few officers who were still loyal to him: Ali Fadhul, Juma Oris, Hussein Marijan, and Juma Sabuni. By then, Amin feared not just defeat at the hands of the Tanzanians, but also an internal coup. He reportedly sent appeals to Syria and Iraq for help, while Libyan troops began to desert their positions in Kampala. In a rally at the capital, Amin still promised his soldiers that victory remained possible and urged them to continue fighting. On 5 April, the TPDF clashed with a Libyan contingent at Kisubi, where 10 Libyans were killed in action, 13 captured, and several drowned in the nearby swamps. The Tanzanians surrounded Entebbe on the following day.

== Aftermath ==
Most of the Ugandan defenders fled Entebbe before the Tanzanians began their ground assault, leaving the defenses mostly in the hands of Libyan forces. The 208th Brigade seized town on 7 April, inflicting heavy casualties on the Libyans. Most of the Libyan troops subsequently withdrew from Uganda. The Uganda Army failed to hold a defensive line at Lubowa. The TPDF advanced into Kampala on 10 April, with the 208th Brigade attacking from Entebbe. The capital was secured with minimal resistance the following day. Combat operations in Uganda continued until 3 June, when Tanzanian forces reached the Sudanese border and eliminated the last resistance.
