= RTD =

RTD may refer to:

== Science and technology ==
- Real-time data
- Residence time distribution
- Resonant-tunneling diode
- Round-trip delay time, in telecommunications
- Research and development, Research and Technical (or Technological) Development
- Resistance Temperature Detector, a resistance thermometer; RTD is also used to rate or describe plywood manufacturing processes where RTD sensors significantly reduce the delamination caused by insufficient heating of the plywood during the press cycle.

== Broadcasting ==
- Radio Tanzania Dar es Salaam
- Radio Television of Djibouti (Radiodiffusion Télévision de Djibouti)
- RT Documentary, an English- and Russian-language TV channel
- Russell T Davies, Welsh screenwriter and television producer

== Publications ==
- RTD info, a European science magazine
- Richmond Times-Dispatch newspaper, Virginia, US

== Transportation ==
- Regional Transportation District, Denver, Colorado, US
- San Joaquin Regional Transit District, Stockton, California, US
- Southern California Rapid Transit District, merged into Los Angeles Metro

== Other uses ==
- Ready to drink beverage
- Corner retirement (referee technical decision), in boxing
- Retired (abbreviation)
- Right to Die
- Russell's theory of descriptions
