= 1972 invasion of Uganda =

Tanzania-backed attempt to overthrow Idi Amin

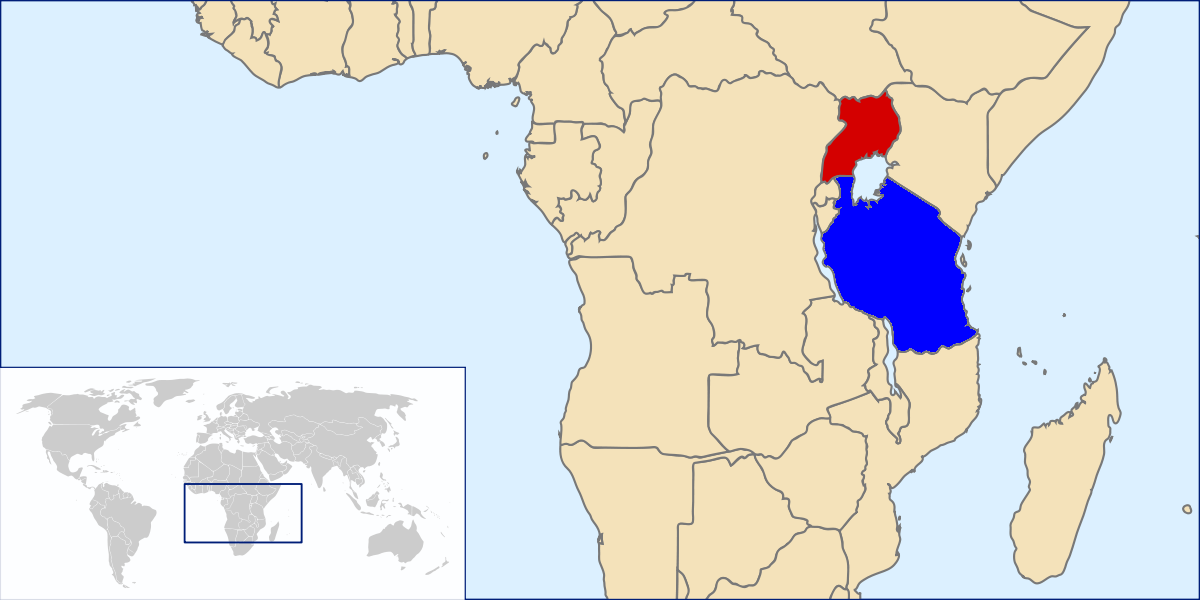
- Uganda (red) was invaded by rebels based in and supported by Tanzania (blue)
Date	September 1972
Location	Southern Uganda
Result	Ugandan government victory

Belligerents
Uganda; Libya; Palestine Liberation Organization (PLO)	Ugandan rebels: People's Army; UPC supporters; Tanzania

Commanders and leaders
(Second Republic of Uganda) Idi Amin (Second Republic of Uganda) Ali Fadhul (Second Republic of Uganda) Yusuf Gowon (Second Republic of Uganda) Isaac Maliyamungu	Milton Obote; David Oyite-Ojok; Tito Okello; Captain Anach; Captain Oyile (executed); Lieutenant Okot (POW); Yoweri Museveni (Tanzania) Julius Nyerere

Units involved
Uganda Army; Simba Battalion; Uganda Army Air Force	People's Army: Uganda People's Liberation Front; Museveni's rebel group

Strength
(Second Republic of Uganda) Thousands (Libyan Arab Republic) 399; Small	1,340–1,500

Casualties and losses
Light	Hundreds killed
- c. 150 Ugandan civilians killed in combat; hundreds executed afterwards 9–20 Tanzanian civilians killed 1 American civilian killed

The 1972 invasion of Uganda was an armed attempt by Ugandan insurgents, supported by Tanzania, to overthrow the regime of Idi Amin. Under the orders of former Ugandan President Milton Obote, insurgents launched an invasion of southern Uganda with limited Tanzanian support in September 1972. The rebel force mostly consisted of the "People's Army" whose forces were mainly loyal to Obote, but also included guerillas led by Yoweri Museveni. The operation was hampered by problems from the start, as a planned rebel commando raid had to be aborted, Amin was warned of the impending invasion, and the rebels lacked numbers, training, and equipment. Regardless, the militants occupied a few towns in southern Uganda at the invasion's start. However, no major popular uprising erupted as Obote had hoped.

Without mass civilian support and outnumbered as well as outgunned, the rebels were mostly defeated by Amin's loyalists within hours. Most insurgents were killed or captured, while the rest fled in disarray back to Tanzania. Reinforced by allied Libyan and PLO troops, the Ugandan security forces launched operations to hunt down and destroy rebel stragglers, while initiating political purges against suspected Obote supporters. Meanwhile, Amin ordered his air force to retaliate by bombing Tanzania, prompting the latter to mobilize its army along the border. Before the conflict could escalate into a full war between Uganda and Tanzania, the two countries agreed to a ceasefire under Somali mediation, and subsequently ratified a treaty in Mogadishu to defuse tensions. Despite this, the conflict greatly worsened the already poor relations between Uganda and Tanzania, and ultimately contributed to the Uganda–Tanzania War.

== Background ==
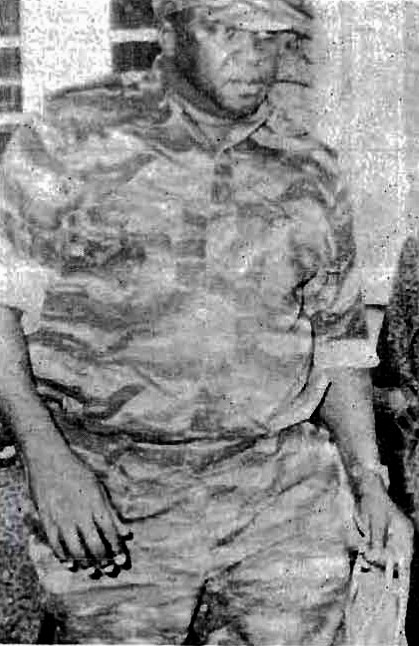
Idi Amin (1977)

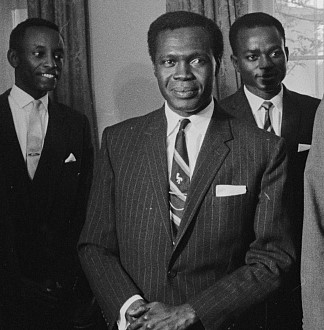
Milton Obote (center, 1962)

In 1971, a military coup overthrew the President of Uganda, Milton Obote. Colonel Idi Amin installed himself as new Ugandan President and ruled the country under a repressive dictatorship. However, this takeover was initially welcomed by many Ugandans, as Obote had become deeply unpopular in sections of the country's population and Amin presented himself as reformer. He freed several opposition figures who had been imprisoned under Obote, including Shaban Opolot, Grace Ibingira, and Benedicto Kiwanuka. The coup resulted in a deterioration of relations with neighbouring Tanzania, as Tanzanian President Julius Nyerere withheld diplomatic recognition of the new government and offered asylum to Obote and his supporters. After the coup, Amin launched purges of his enemies, and empowered his own followers to consolidate his regime. The country's military, officially known as Uganda Army (UA), was most affected by this development. Much of its leadership was killed or expelled, while members of ethnic and religious groups supportive of Amin were recruited and promoted en masse. A large number of soldiers and opposition figures targeted by the purges consequently fled into exile. They set up training camps and organized militant groups in Sudan and Tanzania. Sudanese President Jaafar Nimeiry opposed Amin due to his support for Sudanese Anyanya rebels, while Tanzanian President Nyerere had close ties with Obote and had supported his socialist orientation.

As a result, relations between Uganda and Tanzania became increasingly tense. Nyerere frequently denounced Amin's regime, and Amin made repeated threats to invade Tanzania. The situation was further complicated due to a border dispute, as Uganda claimed that the Kagera Salient—a 720 square miles (1,900 km^{2}) stretch of land between the official border and the Kagera River 18 miles (29 km) to the south, should be placed under its jurisdiction, maintaining that the river made for a more logical border. The border had originally been negotiated by British and German colonial officials before World War I. In addition to the Kagera Salient, Amin also harbored hopes of acquiring a corridor to the Indian Ocean. Accordingly, he contemplated plans of conquering Tanzania's north, including the harbor town of Tanga. Following an armed clash between soldiers along the countries' common border a few months after the coup, Amin issued rules of engagement which clarified that the Uganda Army was only allowed to attack Tanzania in retaliation or if he gave orders to do so. Regardless, his political stance remained highly aggressive.

At the same time, the Ugandan exiles plotted to overthrow Amin with Tanzanian support. One of the first groups to act was Yoweri Museveni's yet-unnamed militant group. It infiltrated Uganda and attempted to establish a guerrilla base at Mount Elgon in 1971, but the militants were discovered and arrested by security forces. Despite being opposed to Obote and his policies, Museveni and his small group of comrades subsequently decided to team up with the former president, viewing Amin as the greater threat. As time went on, Obote's rebel alliance suffered several setbacks. Obote had already planned simultaneous invasions from Sudan and Tanzania to take place in August 1971, but this operation was cancelled due to Nyerere's fear of British and Israeli support for Amin, doubts by the Tanzania People's Defence Force's (TPDF) high command about the invasions' chances of success, and inter-rebel feuds.

In early 1972, Amin reportedly requested Israeli aid for an invasion of Tanzania. When the Israeli government refused to provide weaponry for this plan, the Ugandan President responded by severing diplomatic ties and allying with anti-Israeli forces such as Libya under Muammar Gaddafi and the Palestine Liberation Organization (PLO). Amin also stopped assisting the Anyanya rebels and signed a deal with Sudan, after which the country expelled most Ugandan insurgents from its soil. Sudan-based Obote loyalists had to be evacuated through Kenya to Tanzania; on the way, many died. The survivors joined the few hundred already stationed at Kigwa in the Tabora Region. A few rebels remained in southern Sudan, and attempted an invasion of Uganda in April 1972. The operation was easily crushed by the Uganda Army. In August 1972, Amin ordered the expulsion of Asians from Uganda, confiscating their wealth and claiming that he was redistributing it to other Ugandans. This move was very popular locally, and distracted the population from the ongoing economic crisis. There were growing fears among the rebels and the Tanzanian government that delaying a major rebel invasion continued to diminish its chances of success, while Nyerere was informed that Uganda had joined an international plot to overthrow him. As a result, the Tanzanian President finally signed off a rebel invasion of Uganda for 15 September 1972. Meanwhile, Obote had amassed a force of about 1,300 ex-soldiers who had escaped into exile. His followers were known as the "Uganda People's Liberation Front" (UPLF).

== Prelude ==
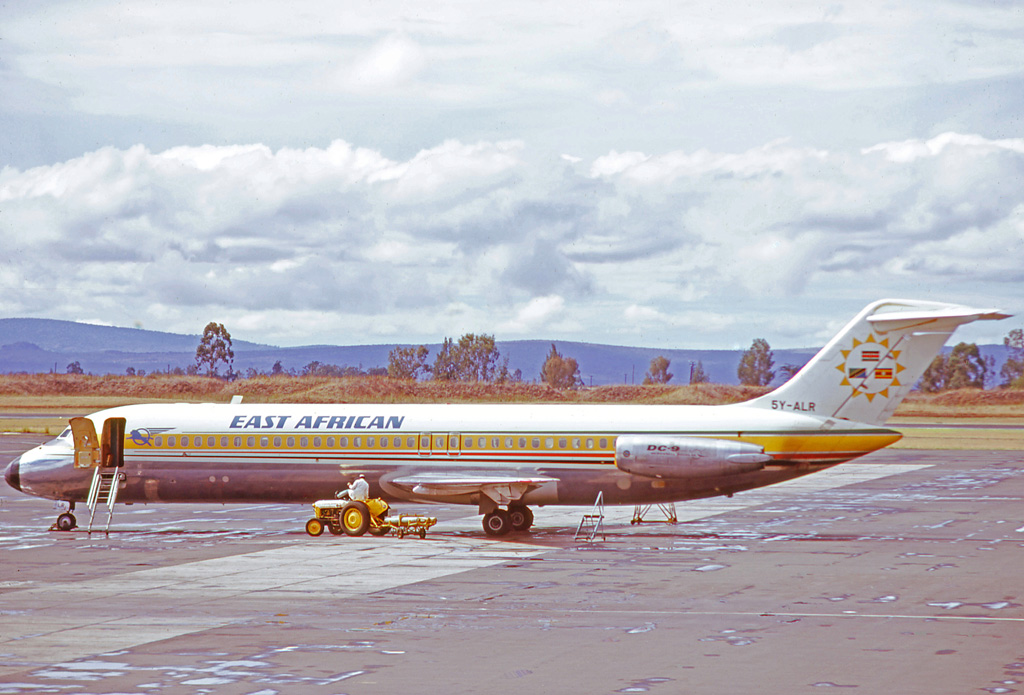
A McDonnell Douglas DC-9 of the East African Airways in 1973

Obote's plan for the invasion was complete by 10 September: First, the rebels would "borrow" an East African Airways McDonnell Douglas DC-9 and use it to transport 80 commandos to Entebbe Airport. (Note: The South African magazine Drum reported that the DC-9 was supposed to carry 300 guerrillas, while the Daily Monitor put the number at 100.) These rebels would capture the airport, march on Kampala, and capture its radio station to broadcast a prerecorded message by Obote. The former president hoped that this would inspire an uprising by civilians and soldiers. Meanwhile, two strike teams of insurgents would cross the border from Tanzania and attack the important towns of Mbarara and Masaka in southern Uganda. After securing these, the rebel ground forces would push on towards Kampala, Mubende, and Fort Portal. The western team targeted Mbarara would attack from the rebel camp at Kigwe, while the team attacking Masaka would start at the Handeni rebel camp. The Voice of Uganda, the Ugandan state newspaper, claimed Tanzanian intelligence director Lawrence Gama was involved in the invasion's planning.

At the same time, the TPDF supplied Museveni's force with guns and assisted them to conduct forays into Uganda to set up anti-Amin cells such as the "Temporary Committee" based in Kampala. Museveni told the Tanzanians that these missions were a great success and that several thousand people were willing to revolt in the Mbarara area. However, he was generally critical of "putschist solutions", believing that Amin could only be toppled through long-term guerrilla war. On 14 September, Museveni was informed of the invasion plans by the Tanzanian defense minister who told him that trucks were already on the way to transport his rebels from their camp to the border. The battle plans presumed that Museveni's undercover network would produce a large number of rebels to assist the invasion. Museveni later claimed that he had not been the one to promise a large fifth column in Uganda. As proof, he pointed at the short notice he was given of the invasion, which made it impossible for him to prepare his underground network for an uprising. Museveni argued that Obote had deliberately overplayed the extent of his insider contacts to convince the Tanzanians of greenlighting the invasion. In general, there were reportedly strong tensions within the rebel alliance, as members of Obote's faction treated Museveni's group "as enemies". Following his capture during the invasion, rebel Alex Ojera also told his Ugandan interrogators that the insurgents had been affected by tribalism, as Bantu, Acholi, and Lango militants distrusted each other.

Amin was informed that a rebel invasion was being organized, and prepared for this possibility by strengthening his southern defenses. The South African magazine Drum stated that the Kenyan intelligence agency was reportedly responsible for leaking the invasion plans, while researcher A. Kasozi argued that information had been leaked by Baganda civilians in southern Uganda who opposed Obote. Journalist Faustin Mugabe held Ugandan spies in Tanzania responsible for uncovering the rebel plans. According to Ugandan army officer Bernard Rwehururu, many Ugandan military officers did not take the warnings about an invasion seriously, and did not properly prepare for this possibility.

== Invasion ==
=== Initial rebel operations ===
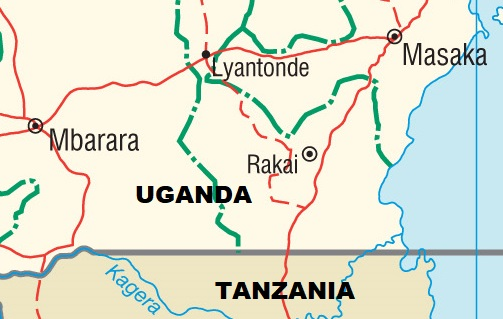
Map of southeastern Uganda showing Masaka and Mbarara

From the beginning, the invasion was a "fiasco" and "disaster." Ugandan historian Samwiri Karugire described it as "One of those rare events in military history. A perfect failure." The DC-9 airplane never arrived at Entebbe. Obote had selected James Lalobo, a son of a friend, to fly the aircraft despite him lacking experience. Although the DC-9 was successfully stolen with support by the Tanzanian intelligence from the Dar es Salaam Airport, the pilot failed to retract its landing gear. In his attempt to temporarily stop at Kilimanjaro International Airport to pick up the commandos on 15 September, he landed at an exceptionally high speed, destroying the DC-9's tires. The raid on Entebbe had to be canceled, while journalists got wind of the events at Kilimanjaro. A newspaper, the Uganda Argus, promptly ran an article titled "Pilot vanishes in DC-9 mystery," alerting Amin that a rebel operation was imminent. He put his southern commanders on alert, sending Simba Battalion commander Ali Fadhul to assess the situation at the border.

Despite having lost the surprise element, the ground invasions continued. Having dubbed his force the "People's Army" or "people's army forces", Obote and the rebel factions under his leadership launched the invasion on 17 September. The entire rebel force was 1,340 to about 1,500 fighters strong. The main rebel group crossed the border at 5:30 a.m. after killing several border guards, and captured Mutukula. It was supposed to target Masaka, about 1,000 fighters strong, and led by Captain Anach or Lieutenant Colonel David Oyite-Ojok and Tito Okello. The main group initially made good progress, overwhelmining a few small groups of soldiers and capturing some military equipment. After being informed of the rebels crossing the Ugandan border, Gaddafi pledged support to his ally Amin, and ordered an intervention force to be sent to Uganda.

Some civilians raised the black-red-blue flag of the Uganda People's Congress in support of the rebels.

The western rebel force, led by Captain Oyile, (Note: His name was also spelled "Oyire" and "Oyira"; he was reportedly Obote's cousin.) Lieutenant Okot, and Lieutenant Okumu, crossed the border at 7 a.m, behind schedule. Armed with a few sub-machine guns, recoilless rifles, and rockets, it consisted of about 300 to 350 guerrillas and included Museveni's small force of 40 militants. The western group was troubled by internal problems from the start. Whereas the Obote loyalists were wearing uniforms and expecting an easy victory, Museveni's group wore civilian clothing to fight as guerrillas. Several members of the western group expressed doubts about their outdated weaponry and their small numbers compared to the Uganda Army. Some militants in the group were even unarmed. The group also had problems with their trucks, slowing their progress. However, the group initially destroyed a Ugandan border post, killing four guards. After advancing 8.7 miles (14 km) into Uganda proper, the rebels encountered a Land Rover with eight soldiers who were killed in a firefight at Kaberebere. Despite this easy victory, some rebels were so inexperienced that they already broke during this clash and fled into the hills. The remainder continued their advance. They also ran into Fadhul, but they failed to recognize him in his civilian car. The commander sped past the insurgents and then informed Amin by telephone of the rebels' numbers and location. According to the Ugandan government, the rebels occupied Kyotera, Kakuto and Kalisizo. Tanzanian radio reports also claimed that Kisenyi and Umburra had been captured by rebels. A few civilians reacted to the western insurgent group by raising the flags of the Uganda People's Congress, Obote's party. However, contrary to Museveni's hopes, no grand rebellion erupted in the Mbarara area to support the invasion. Most civilians were still supportive of Amin at the time, especially due to his ongoing expulsion of the Ugandan Asians from the country.

Meanwhile, the Ugandan government loyalists reacted by organizing their defenses. At 9 a.m. the Simba Battalion's second-in-command Yusuf Gowon raised the alarm at the Mbarara barracks, and ordered most of his troops to take up defensive positions. He also dispatched several jeeps to guard the road at the barracks. The western strike team of insurgents arrived at Mbarara at 10:30 a.m., where they destroyed a few roadblocks and an abandoned jeep before moving to assault the town's barracks. Without proper supplies, badly trained and lacking experienced leadership, the rebels failed to capture the Mbarara barracks. As soon as they approached the garrison, an army jeep opened fire with a recoilless rifle and destroyed a rebel truck. The entire insurgent advance promptly fell into disarray. Captain Oyile "disappeared", while several militants fled into the nearby woods. Museveni and thirty of his guerrillas advanced up to the barracks' gates, taking cover at an anthill and firing at the soldiers. Another group of rebels took position at a mosque and fired at the barracks with a mortar. Some rebels attempted to climb across a wire fence which surrounded the barracks, but were easily killed by Gowon's troops. After an hour of fighting, the rebels retreated. As the remaining rebels were left mostly leaderless, Museveni took command and led the survivors back to the Tanzanian border. They were pursued by Gowon's troops. Many more rebels were killed during the retreat than during the battle at Mbarara. Several insurgents attempted to hide with local civilians, including Oyile, Okot, and Okumu, only to be handed over to the Uganda Army.

The eastern rebel force was stopped at Kiziba by a large Uganda Army contingent. (Note: According to Museveni's account, Tito Okello had called for reinforcements before arriving at Kalisizo. He did so using an army radio without changing frequency; Uganda Army members promptly answered, pretending to be insurgents and telling him to move to a certain area to receive ammunition. The Ugandan loyalists then disptached troops to the Lukoma airstrip in the south from where they moved to ambush the eastern rebel convoy.) The government forces included tanks and armoured personnel carriers. As the rebels lacked weaponry to overcome the government forces, and also ran out of ammunition, they quickly broke off the attack. About 169 rebels were killed in this clash. Having suffered heavy losses, they retreated under the cover of darkness.

=== Rebel retreat and border clashes ===
By early 18 September, the rebels were in full retreat. Only 46 insurgents belonging to the Mbarara strike force reportedly reached the Tanzanian border on that day. At least 100 insurgents of this group were killed and several others captured to be later executed. The casualties included important members of Museveni's faction such as Mwesigwa Black and Omongin Raila. Government loyalists fully retook Mbarara, Kalisizo and Kyotera, while Mutukula remained outside Uganda Army control. According to Rwehururu, the insurgents were routed at Kalisizo by a combined force, consisting of Simba Battalion and Suicide Regiment troops led by Lt. Atanasius. One group of about 500 rebels retreated into the marshes between Masaka and the Tanzanian border, where they dug in. Informants in Tanzania claimed that these insurgents were provided with fresh supplies, equipment, and some reinforcements from Tanzania.

Amin blamed Nyerere for backing and arming his enemies, and claimed that 1,000 Tanzanian soldiers had been part of the invasion force. He retaliated by ordering his air force to bomb Tanzanian border towns. The Uganda Army Air Force targeted Mwanza and Bukoba from 18 to 20 September, claiming to have destroyed insurgent camps there. The TPDF moved its 4th battalion and a mortar company to safeguard the border. Amin also accused Israel, Britain, and India of supporting the attack, and the rebels of being in the pocket of the unpopular Ugandan Asians. A Uganda Army spokesman stated that three white Israeli mercenaries had been working with the insurgents and killed during the invasion, with foreign observers fearing that these "mercenaries" had actually been white civilians caught in the crossfire.

On 19 September, President Amin declared "complete victory" over the insurgents, despite the latter still holding some areas. He publicly claimed that his troops had secured a copy of the rebels' battle plans, and falsely stated that the insurgents had intended to massacre certain tribes and professions. Enraged, groups of civilians banded together and began to hunt for rebel stragglers, lynching those whom they captured. Some civilians used the opportunity to settle grudges, trying to frame innocents as insurgent supporters. The official mopping-up operations and purges of pro-rebel elements were entrusted to Fadhul, Gowon, and Isaac Maliyamungu. Fadhul was entrusted with the countryside, Gowon was responsible for Mbarara, and Maliyamungu organized the purges in Masaka. The State Research Centre (SRC) played a major role in rounding up suspected anti-Amin elements. At Mbarara, an ad hoc court was set up presided over by Gowon; several suspected rebels were sentenced to death, although others were found innocent and freed.

On 20 September, five Libyan Lockheed C-130 Hercules carrying 399 soldiers and military equipment crossed into Sudanese airspace in the attempt to reach Uganda. They were forced by Sudanese jets to land in Khartoum; the Sudanese authorities confiscated their weaponry and instructed them to return to Libya. The C-130 pilots assured the Sudanese that they would follow these instructions, but then continued their flight to Uganda, flying below the Sudanese radar. The Libyans landed in Entebbe on 21 September. Despite them arriving too late to offer "meaningful assistance" in the fighting against the rebels, their presence boosted Amin's local image. Libya also sent some Palestine Liberation Organization commandos, and a MiG jet to assist Amin. On 24 September, the Ugandan government claimed that guerrillas were still controlling the towns of Mutukula and Kikagati. Amin claimed on 28 September that about 50 guerrillas remained on Ugandan soil, encircled by Uganda Army troops. By the next day, foreign journalists stated that the fighting had mostly ceased.

== International reactions and mediation ==
The invasion and the Tanzanian support for the insurgents were internationally condemned, especially by the Organisation of African Unity (OAU). Nigeria, Guinea, Libya, and Egypt openly condemned the Tanzanian training and arming of Ugandan rebels. In response, Tanzania People's Defence Force (TPDF) commander Major General Mrisho Sarakikya denied any Tanzanian involvement in the rebel operation. Nyerere also sent a telegram to OAU chairman Hassan II of Morocco protesting the Ugandan airstrikes targeting Tanzanian towns. To avoid open war, the OAU requested third-party countries to mediate between Uganda and Tanzania. The OAU initially approached Kenyan President Jomo Kenyatta, but he and his government refused to get involved in the dispute. Emperor Haile Selassie of Ethiopia, Algerian President Houari Boumédiène and Guinean President Ahmed Sékou Touré offered to organize the mediation, while Egypt contacted Tanzanian Foreign Minister John Malecela to seek a peaceful solution. However, a five-point peace plan by Somali President Siad Barre was the most positively received proposal in Uganda as well as Tanzania, though Amin initially continued his aggressive rhetoric while Ugandan and Tanzanian representatives met in the Somali capital Mogadishu.

== Aftermath ==
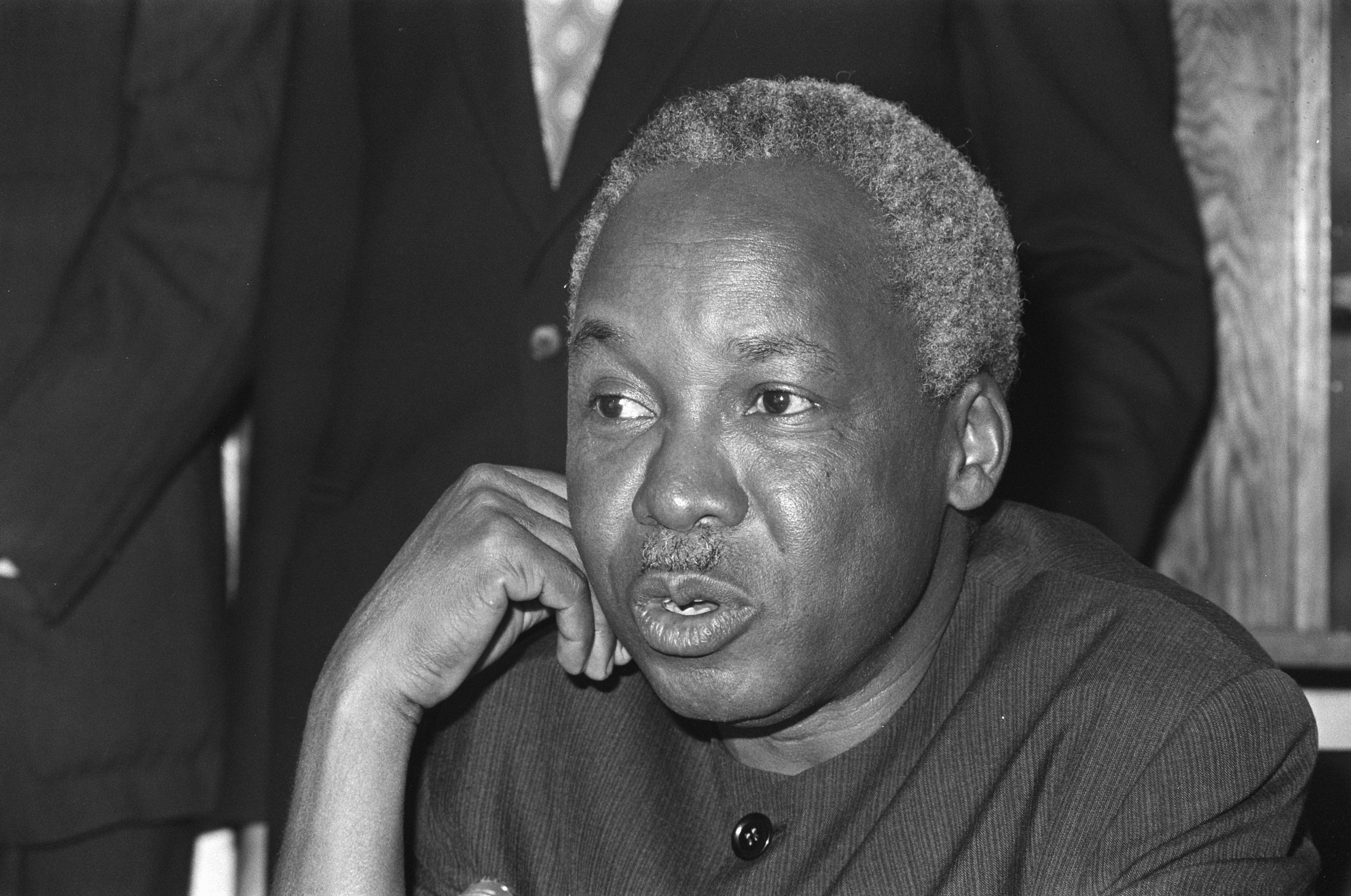
Tanzanian President Julius Nyerere (pictured 1975) refrained from further escalating the conflict.

Though his commanders urged him to respond in kind to the Ugandan border attacks, Nyerere agreed to the mediation overseen by Siad Barre, which resulted in the signing of the Mogadishu Agreement, which stipulated that Ugandan and Tanzanian forces retreat to positions at least 6.2 miles (10 km) away from the other's border and refrain from supporting opposition forces that targeted each other's governments. The Ugandan rebel camp at Handeni was closed, and the Obote loyalists were resettled to Tabora in central Tanzania to live as tobacco farmers. The agreement was signed on 5 October 1972. Amin and Nyerere would remain deeply hostile.

Overall, the rebels were completely defeated and suffered heavy losses; hundreds were killed. The Daily Monitor put the insurgent losses at 454 dead. The Uganda Army admitted that nine soldiers had been killed. According to the Ugandan government, about 150 Ugandan civilians had died during the invasion. Between nine and 20 Tanzanian civilians were killed during the Ugandan airstrikes. One American Peace Corps worker was killed by crossfire in southern Uganda.

After the invasion Amin posed on television with several captured rebels. Several alleged guerrillas were later secretly or publicly executed including Captain Oyile, former Information Minister Alex Ojera, Picho Ali, (Note: The Ugandan government initially declared that Oyile, Ojera, and six other members of the invasion force had "escaped custody" instead of admitting that they had been killed.) and former Deputy Minister of Cooperatives Joshua Wakholi. Amin also used the invasion as an opportunity to kill political opponents, regardless of whether they had supported the rebel attack or not. Hundreds of people belonging to the country's civilian elite were arrested and killed. These purges were led by the Military Police, SRC, and Public Safety Unit. Benedicto Kiwanuka (whom Amin had freed in 1971 and appointed Chief Justice of Uganda) was among those murdered in the rebel attack's aftermath. There were numerous executions of suspected Uganda People's Congress supporters in the Masaka and Mbarara areas, and many imprisoned opposition figures were also killed. Many Ugandans were shocked at the mass killings following the invasion, as they had still considered Amin to be the "reformer and messiah" as whom he had previously presented himself. Amin also ordered an acceleration of the expulsion of Asians from Uganda in response to the invasion, and purged the police as well as the Uganda Army of suspected disloyal elements. Several ethnic Baganda officers were forcibly disappeared, while the President was publicly "lashing out" against Acholi and Langi soldiers, ordering them to "stop their dirty activities". The 1972 invasion is regarded in Uganda as the turning point at which Amin's regime became much more violent than before, becoming more paranoid and more willing to outright murder civilians. Even though the purges were an attempt to stabilize the Ugandan government so that it became less vulnerable to external attacks, the killings damaged its reputation and popularity. As a result, Amin came to rely even more on terror to stay in power. Researcher Alicia Decker concluded that the terror ultimately "devoured his regime from within". Amin's popularity also suffered when the expulsion of Ugandan Asians proved to cause severe long-term problems, greatly harming the country's economy and international reputation. About twenty thousand Ugandans fled the country, resettling in Tanzania.

Insurgent activity against Amin continued, and Nyerere informed the Ugandan rebels that anti-Amin activities would be tolerated in Tanzania despite the Mogadishu Agreement. The Tanzanian President asked the insurgents to stay mostly clandestine and not inform him of their operations. Tanzania also continued to treat Obote like a head of state. However, the failed invasion caused great disagreements among the anti-Amin opposition, as rebel leaders blamed each other for the defeat. Obote never forgave Museveni for the fact that the popular uprising at Mbarara had not occurred as he had allegedly promised. In early 1973, Museveni officially announced the formation of the "Front for National Salvation" (FRONASA), while Obote reorganized and rebuilt his guerrilla force. FRONASA, Obote's rebels, and other militant factions took part in the Uganda–Tanzania War of 1978–79 which resulted in Amin's overthrow. Obote subsequently returned to power in the disputed 1980 Ugandan general elections, causing several opposition groups to take up arms. In the course of the Ugandan Bush War, Museveni's National Resistance Movement emerged victorious and he became Ugandan President in 1986.
