= Mahmoud Da'as =

Palestinian PLO militant (1934–2009)

- Born: 1934; Hajjah, Qalqilya, Mandatory Palestine
- Died: 2009 (aged 74–75); Jordan
- Military career
- Allegiance: Jordan; Palestine Liberation Organisation (PLO)
- Branch: Jordanian Armed Forces (JAF); Fatah
- Rank: Lieutenant colonel (JAF); Major general (PLO)
- Nickname: Abu Khalid
- Commands: Jordanian Engineering Corps' 2nd Battalion (JAF); Yarmouk Forces (PLO)
- Conflicts: Black September; Uganda–Tanzania War; Operation Dada Idi; Fall of Kampala; 1982 Lebanon War; Siege of Beirut
- Other work: Deputy in the Palestinian Legislative Council

Mahmoud Da'as (Arabic: مَحمود دَعّاس, also known by his kunya Abu Khalid; 1934 – 2009) was a high-ranking commander of the Palestine Liberation Organisation (PLO), serving as long-time member of Fatah's Revolutionary Council and Supreme Military Council. Born in northern Palestine, Da'as grew up in Jordan where he joined the Jordanian Armed Forces (JAF). Educated as military engineer, he was eventually appointed lieutenant colonel and head of the Jordanian Engineering Corps' 2nd Battalion. Da'as joined the PLO in 1967, and defected from the JAF during the Black September of 1970. He consequently rose in the ranks of the PLO, and became an important military commander in the Arab–Israeli conflict, taking part in missions in Lebanon, Yemen, Sudan, and Uganda. Following the Oslo I Accord, Da'as became President Yasser Arafat's personal military advisor and a deputy in the Palestinian Legislative Council.

== Early life and service in the Jordanian Armed Forces ==
Mahmoud Da'as was born to ethnic Palestinian parents in Hajjah, a village located in the Qalqilya District of Mandatory Palestine. Soon after his birth, his family relocated to the Jordianian city of al-Karak, where his father found work as policeman in the British-led security forces. Da'as completed his primary and secondary education in al-Karak, and then joined the Royal Jordanian Army's academy. He qualified as military engineer, and was sent for further training to Great Britain as well as the United States.

After completing his training, Da'as joined the Jordanian Engineering Corps and gradually rose in the ranks. He was appointed commander of the 7th Company in the corps' 2nd Battalion, and was promoted to head of the entire 2nd Battalion and lieutenant colonel. In 1957, he was arrested due to suspicions about his involvement in an alleged military coup attempt. After his innocence was proven, he was released. Da'as was again temporarily arrested in 1966, and joined the Palestine Liberation Organisation (PLO) in the following year.

== PLO career ==
In 1970, war broke out between the previously allied Jordanian government under King Hussein and the PLO led by Yasser Arafat. This conflict became known as the "Black September", and resulted in the desertion of many Jordanian soldiers of Palestinian descent. Mahmoud was one of those who sided with the PLO, and defected in Jerash. He was appointed deputy commander of the PLO's so-called "Yarmouk Forces". Serving under Saad Sayel, he consequently battled against his former comrades in the Royal Jordanian Army. The PLO was defeated, and ousted from Jordan by mid-1971. Mahmoud relocated to Syria, where he took part in Fatah's third conference at Hamouriyah in September 1971. He was appointed member of the Revolutionary Council of Fatah during this conference, and promoted to commander of the Yarmouk Forces in 1972. He consequently assumed command of PLO troops stationed in Mount Lebanon and the Beqaa Valley. As experienced military engineer, he was responsible for the construction of fortifications for Palestinian militants.

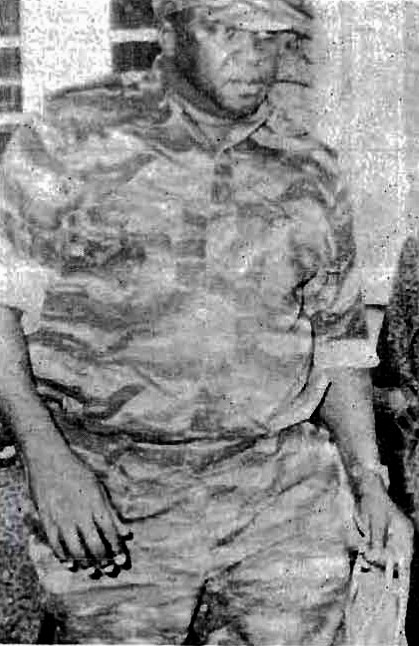
Mahmoud Da'as unsuccessfully fought to save the Ugandan regime of Idi Amin (pictured) during the Uganda–Tanzania War.

In the late 1970s, the PLO faced a crisis relating to its affairs in Africa. The organisation had forged a strong alliance with Uganda under Idi Amin, establishing bases in the country where it trained about 400 fighters. When the Uganda–Tanzania War broke out in 1978, the Uganda Army quickly proved incapable in the face of the Tanzania People's Defence Force (TPDF), and Amin's regime began to collapse. The PLO high command was alarmed, fearing that the end of Amin's government would result in the ouster of the Palestinian militants from Uganda. The PLO consequently opted to fight alongside the Uganda Army and sent further reinforcements. Despite being aided by the PLO and Libya, the Uganda Army was completely defeated in the Battle of Lukaya on 10–11 March 1979. Most PLO field commanders were wounded at Lukaya, whereupon Da'as was appointed replacement commander for Uganda. Realizing that the war was lost, he divided his remaining troops into two groups. One secured an escape route to Sudan, whereas the other took up defensive positions at Uganda's capital Kampala. In late March, PLO troops were part of the garrison which attempted to defend the strategic town of Mpigi. The Tanzanians began their attack on Kampala on 10 April 1979, and the PLO troops under Da'as reportedly resisted some time before retreating northward. He managed to bring his surviving men to Sudan despite being hindered by bad roads, a hostile population, and dangerous wildlife.

Da'as was appointed member of the Supreme Military Council of the Palestinian Revolution (Note: Also known as "Fatah Higher Military Council") during Fatah's fourth conference in Damascus in May 1980. He was also sent to East Germany, where he signed an agreement with General Helmut Borufka, inspector general of the National People's Army, on 19 April 1982. According to this agreement, the East German military would provide training to 20 PLO artillery commanders and technicians. In the next month, Israel invaded Lebanon, starting the 1982 Lebanon War. In course of this conflict, Da'as served as Director of Officer Affairs and Fortifications and took part in the fighting against the Israel Defense Forces, including during the Siege of Beirut.

Following the war, he became Commander in Chief of the Palestinian Revolution Forces. By 1983, he also headed PLO special operations in Sudan and Yemen. Da'as was appointed External Security Officer in the PLO's Political Department in 1985, and was brigadier by the following year. He subsequently rose to major general and was promoted to head of the Security and Intelligence Committee in 1993. As result of the Oslo I Accord, Da'as and the rest of the PLO leadership was able to return to Palestine in 1994, and he became a candidate in the 1996 Palestinian general election. He was elected deputy in the Palestinian Legislative Council, holding a seat until 2005. President Yasser Arafat made him his military advisor and a member of Palestine's Supreme National Security Council. Da'as continued to take part in important military and diplomatic missions in the name of the PLO and Fatah.

Having fallen terminally sick, Da'as moved to Jordan for treatment where he died in 2009. He was buried with full military honors at his birthplace of Hajjah. The funeral was attended by several high-ranking Palestinian politicians and military officers as well as thousands of locals.
