= Second Republic of Uganda =

Military dictatorship of Idi Amin (1971–1979)

Republic of Uganda
- 1971–1979
- Flag Coat of arms
- Anthem: "Oh Uganda, Land of Beauty"
- Capital: Kampala
- Common languages: English, Swahili
- Religion: Christianity, Islam
- Government: Military dictatorship
- President
  - 1971–1979: Idi Amin
- Vice President
  - 1977–1979: Mustafa Adrisi
- History
  - Amin seizes power: 25 January 1971
  - Expulsion of Asians: August 1972
  - Uganda–Tanzania War: 30 October 1978
  - Fall of Kampala: 11 April 1979
  - Last pro-Amin holdouts ousted from Uganda: 3 June 1979
- Currency: Ugandan shilling
- ISO 3166 code: UG
| Preceded by | Succeeded by |
| First Republic of Uganda | Third Republic of Uganda |
- Today part of: Uganda

The Second Republic of Uganda existed from 1971 to 1979, when Uganda was ruled by Idi Amin's military dictatorship. Amin's rule formally came to an end with the Uganda-Tanzania War, which ended with Tanzania occupying Uganda and Amin fleeing into exile.

The Ugandan economy was devastated by Idi Amin's policies, including the expulsion of Asians, the nationalisation of businesses and industry, and the expansion of the public sector. The real value of salaries and wages collapsed by 90% in less than a decade. The number of people killed as a result of his regime is unknown; estimates from international observers and human rights groups range from 100,000 to 500,000.

== Taking power ==
From Uganda's independence from Great Britain in 1962 to early 1971, Milton Obote's regime had terrorized, harassed, and tortured people. Frequent food shortages led to food prices experiencing hyper-inflation, with one contributing factor being Obote's persecution of Indian traders. During Obote's regime, flagrant and widespread corruption had emerged. The regime was disliked, particularly in Buganda where people had suffered the most.

By January 1971, Milton Obote, then President of Uganda, was prepared to rid himself of the potential threat posed by Idi Amin. Departing for the 1971 Commonwealth Heads of Government Meeting at Singapore, he relayed orders to loyal Langi officers that Amin and his supporters in the army were to be arrested. Various versions emerged of the way this news was leaked to Amin. Also, the role of the foreign powers in the coup had been debated after the fact. Documents declassified by the British Foreign Office reveal that, contrary to earlier speculations, it was not directly facilitated by Great Britain but benefited from covert support by Israel which saw Idi Amin as an agent to de-stabilise Islamic Sudan. The documents however, unveil an outrightly positive assessment of Amin's personality by the British authorities as well as recommendations of support and the sale of arms to the new regime.

In any case, Amin decided to forestall Obote and strike first. In the early morning hours of 25 January 1971, mechanized army units loyal to him attacked strategic targets in Kampala and the airport at Entebbe, where the first shell fired by a pro-Amin tank commander killed two Roman Catholic priests in the airport waiting room. Amin's troops easily overcame the disorganized opposition to the coup, and Amin almost immediately initiated mass executions of Acholi and Langi troops, whom he believed to be pro-Obote.

The Amin coup was warmly welcomed by most of the people of the Buganda kingdom, which Obote had attempted to dismantle. They seemed willing to forget that their new president, Idi Amin, had been the tool of that military suppression. Amin stated intentions about his government's intent to play a mere "caretaker role" until the country could recover sufficiently for civilian rule. Amin repudiated Obote's non-aligned foreign policy, and his government was quickly recognized by Israel, Britain, and the United States. By contrast, presidents Julius Nyerere of Tanzania, Kenneth Kaunda of Zambia, Jomo Kenyatta of Kenya, and the Organization of African Unity (OAU) initially refused to accept the legitimacy of the new military government. Nyerere, in particular, opposed Amin's regime, and he offered hospitality to the exiled Obote, facilitating his attempts to raise a force and return to power.

== Once in power ==
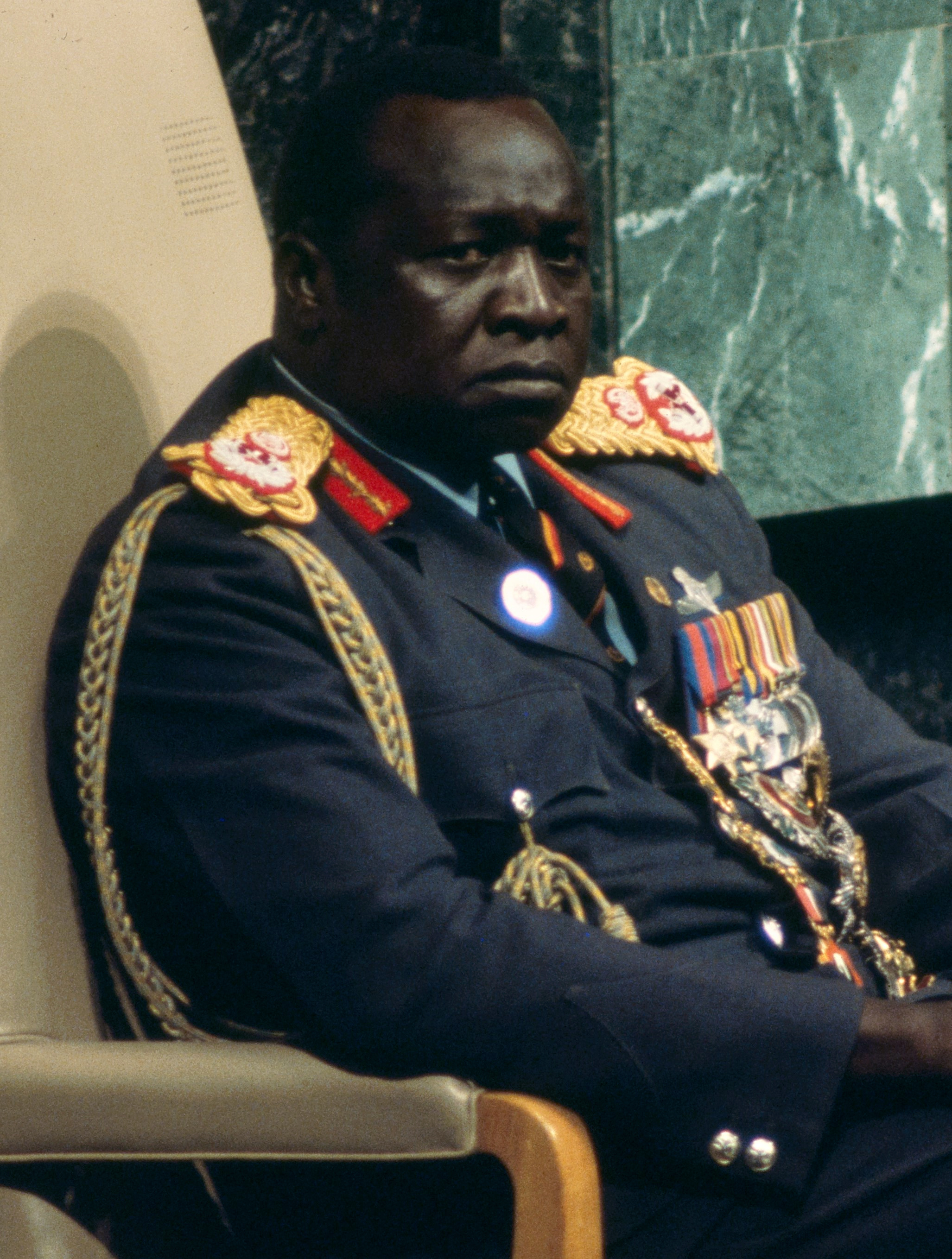
Amin, 1975

Amin's military experience, which was virtually his only experience, determined the character of his rule. He renamed Government House "the Command Post", instituted an advisory defence council composed of military commanders, placed military tribunals above the system of civil law, appointed soldiers to top government posts and parastatal agencies, and even informed the newly inducted civilian cabinet ministers that they would be subject to military discipline.

Uganda then became a military dictatorship which was, in effect, governed from a collection of military barracks scattered across the country, where battalion commanders, acting like local warlords, represented the coercive arm of the government. The Ugandan General Service Unit (GSU), an intelligence agency created by the previous government, was disbanded and replaced by the Ugandan State Research Bureau (SRB). SRB headquarters at Nakasero became the scene of torture and executions over the next couple of years.

Martin Ewans, the chief of the British Foreign Office's East Africa Desk wrote in 1977 that Amin's rule reflected his background in the King's African Rifles, writing: "All this, however, is qualified by Amin's training as a British 'other rank'. As the British army says, ‘if you see something, whitewash it; if it moves, salute it’. To some extent, Amin rules Uganda like an army barracks. First, the whitewash. Kampala, for example, is-or was when I last saw it-a well-run city. The hedges are cut, the verges trimmed, the road signs painted. Amin himself dresses immaculately, if bizarrely. Appearances are important...Not only in good order, however, but also military discipline. Ministers obey instructions, the Commanding Officer gives and receives 'briefings'. Affairs are run from a 'command post'. Wrong-doers are, so to speak, put on a charge and shot for desertion; if you need some serious law-enforcement, you have a court martial. The concept of hierarchy prevails over that of persuasion or consultation." The British anthropologist Mark Leopold noted that Amin had served in the King's African Rifles during the Kenya Emergency in the 1950s, during which he and others had engaged in "unrestrained violence" against the Kenyans, and that much of Amin's leadership style reflected his formative years.

Despite its outward display of a military chain of command, Amin's government was arguably more consumed with rivalries, regional divisions, and ethnic politics than the Uganda People's Congress (UPC) coalition that it had replaced. The army itself was an arena of lethal competition, in which the losers were usually eliminated. Within the officer corps, those trained in Britain opposed those trained in Israel, and both stood against the untrained, who soon eliminated many of the army's most experienced officers. In 1966, well before the Amin era, northerners in the army had assaulted and harassed soldiers from the south. In 1971 and 1972, the Lugbara and Kakwa (Amin's ethnic group) from the West Nile were slaughtering northern Acholi and Langi, who were identified with Obote. Then the Kakwa fought the Lugbara. Amin came to rely on Nubians and on former Anyanya rebels from southern Sudan. Starting in March 1971, Amin embarked a policy of systematically disarming and massacring Acholi and Langi soldiers, whom he viewed as potentially disloyal to his regime. The pace of the purge was greatly increased following several mutinies in July 1971.

Amin recruited his followers from his own tribe, the Kakwas, along with Sudanese and Nubians. By 1977, these three groups formed 60% of the 22 top generals and 75% of the cabinet. Similarly, Muslims formed 80% and 87.5% of these groups even though they were only 5% of the population. This helps explain why Amin survived eight attempted coups. By 1972, the Ugandan Army was largely composed of men from the West Nile Province (Amin's home province), along with men from the provinces in the Congo and the Sudan that bordered the West Nile Province. The Ugandan army grew from 10,000 to over 25,000 by 1978. Amin's army was largely a mercenary force. Half the soldiers were Sudanese, 26% Congolese, only 24% were Ugandan, mostly Muslim and Kakwa. The new Ugandan Army formed by Amin was largely undisciplined and came to support themselves by looting and stealing, which gave the new Amin regime a narrow, but real base of support while alienating the rest of the Ugandan population.

On 7 August 1973, Idi Amin decreed Swahili was to be Uganda's official language. Twelve out of the twenty districts had chosen this, while the other eight wanted Luganda. The army, which had been progressively expanded under Obote, was further doubled and redoubled under Amin. Recruitment was largely, but not entirely, in the north. There were periodic purges, when various battalion commanders were viewed as potential problems or became real threats. Each purge provided new opportunities for promotions from the ranks. The commander of the Uganda Air Force, Smuts Guweddeko, had previously worked as a telephone operator; the unofficial executioner for the regime, Major Isaac Maliyamungu, had formerly been a nightwatch officer. By the mid-1970s, only the most trustworthy military units were allowed ammunition, although this prohibition did not prevent a series of mutinies and murders. An attempt by an American journalist, Nicholas Stroh, and his colleague, Robert Siedle, to investigate one of these barracks outbreaks in 1971 at the Simba battalion in Mbarara led to their disappearances and later their deaths. Several army officers who were suspected of having been involved in the murder of Stroh and Siedle were later appointed to high-ranking positions: Among these were Military Tribunal chairman Juma Butabika, chief technical officer of the airforce Captain Taban, Minister of Transport Juma Sabuni, and Minister for Provincial Administration Ali Fadhul.

=== Muammar Gaddafi and the Soviet Union ===
During his eight years as Uganda's ruler, Amin never forgot the source of his power. He spent much of his time rewarding, promoting, and manipulating the officers and soldiers of the Ugandan army. Financing his ever-increasing military expenditures was a continuing concern. Early in 1972, he reversed foreign policy — never a major issue for Amin — to secure financial and military aid from Muammar Gaddafi of Libya. Amin expelled the remaining Israeli advisers, to whom he was much indebted, and became anti-Israel. To induce foreign aid from Saudi Arabia, he rediscovered his previously neglected Islamic heritage. Amin was very close to King Faisal of Saudi Arabia, who won his favor in 1972 by giving him a lavish private jet to travel in, which was considerably more luxurious than the private jet he had received from Israel the previous year. He also commissioned the construction of a great mosque on Kampala Hill in the capital city, but it was never completed during his rule because much of the money intended for it was embezzled. In 2008 Amin's dream of building one of Africa's largest mosques came true, and construction was finally completed more than 30 years after it initially began.

Following his foreign policy reversal in 1972, the Soviet Union became Amin's largest arms supplier.

East Germany helped to build Amin's secret police. During the Tanzanian invasion in 1979, East Germany attempted to remove evidence about its involvement.

=== Expulsion of Asians and nationalisations ===
In August 1972, Amin gave most of Uganda's 80,000 Asians, most of whom were the descendants of indentured servants and other laborers from India, 90 days to leave the country, and seized their property, homes and businesses. At the time of the expulsion, there were approximately 80,000 individuals of South Asian descent in Uganda, of whom 23,000 had had their applications for citizenship both processed and accepted. Although the latter were ultimately exempted from the expulsion, many chose to leave voluntarily. The expulsion took place against a backdrop of Indophobia in Uganda, with Amin accusing a minority of the Asian population of disloyalty, non-integration and commercial malpractice, claims Indian leaders disputed. Amin defended the expulsion by arguing that he was giving Uganda back to the ethnic Ugandan.

Many of the expellees were citizens of the United Kingdom and Colonies and 27,200 subsequently emigrated to the United Kingdom. Of the other refugees who were accounted for, 6,000 went to Canada, 4,500 refugees ended up in India and 2,500 went to nearby Kenya. In total, some 5,655 firms, ranches, farms, and agricultural estates were reallocated, along with cars, homes and other household goods. Although Amin proclaimed that the "common man" was the beneficiary of this drastic act — which proved immensely popular in Uganda and most of Africa — it was actually the Ugandan army that emerged with the houses, cars, and businesses of the departing Asian minority. This expropriation of foreign property proved disastrous for the already declining economy. With the economy now run by Ugandan army officers and supporters (many of whom had no experience in how to run a business), all of the local businesses and stores were soon run into the ground from a combination of mismanagement and abuse of power, cement factories at Tororo and Fort Portal collapsed from lack of maintenance and neglect, and sugar production all over the country gradually ground to a halt as unmaintained machinery jammed permanently.

Uganda's export crops were sold by government parastatals, but most of the foreign currency they earned went for purchasing weapons and imports for the army. The most famous example of this was the so-called "whisky runs" to Stansted Airport in England during the early years of Amin's rule. Ugandan army transport planes flew thousands of miles to England where they were loaded with crates of expensive Scotch whisky, transistor radios, gold Rolex wristwatches, and other luxury items that were purchased for Amin and flown back to Uganda where they were distributed among Ugandan army officers and soldiers. Amin later justified his rewarding and doting on the Ugandan army by quoting an old African proverb, which summed up to Amin's treatment of his army: "A dog with a bone in its mouth can't bite."

With the Ugandan economy faltering, the rural African producers and farmers, particularly of coffee, turned to smuggling, especially to Kenya. The smuggling problem became an obsession with Amin; toward the end of his rule, he appointed his mercenary and political adviser, the former British citizen Bob Astles, to take all necessary steps to eliminate the problem. These steps included orders to the Ugandan police and army to shoot smugglers on sight.

=== "Keep Uganda Clean" ===
Amin had something of an obsession with cleanliness, and in 1973 launched the "Keep Uganda Clean" campaign, where the regime sought to have the entire Ugandan population involved in keeping public areas clean. In December 1974, the British High Commissioner in Kampala, James Hennessy, in a report to London noted: "The President runs things as he was taught by his British COs to run a battalion. The cleanliness, the tidiness, the spit and polish, the smart police-even the flowers around the petrol stations – these are the result of direct, personal orders from the top. Nothing is too small to escape his attention: the length of the women's dresses, the importance of boiling the drinking water, the need for personal hygiene – there is no argument. Ugandans are naturally submissive. They repress their feelings, stand patiently in queues...aware that it is not much use trying to argue with a gun".

Besides for Amin's obsessive fear of "dirt" and "filth", the "Keep Uganda Clean" campaign served as both a means of social control and a way for the regime to demonstrate an ability to successfully execute a policy. The expulsion of the Asians in 1972 had deprived Uganda of most of its lorry (truck) mechanics, and by 1973 almost all of the garbage lorries were out of commission, leading to widespread complaints that garbage was piling up in the streets. Amin was inspired by the salongo campaign in neighbouring Zaire where the regime of President-for-life Mobutu Sese Seko had imposed of forced labour upon the entire population who were expected to perform at least several hours of cleaning up public areas for free every week. On 21 September 1973, Amin launched his "Keep Uganda Clean" campaign by giving orders that all businesses and government offices were to be closed between 2:00 pm–6:00 pm that day to clean up the streets, where garbage had been piling up since 1972. "Keep Uganda clean" days became a regular fixture of the regime from then on with ordinary Ugandans expected to devote an entire day to cleaning up their areas. The campaign was marked by a great degree of coercion with policemen and soldiers overseeing the cleaning of public areas and ordinary Ugandans being berated by officials for the "filth" and "dirt" within their homes as Amin made it clear that he wanted homes in Uganda to measure up to his ideals of cleanliness.

The "Keep Uganda Clean" campaign received more momentum when Amin appointed General Abdallah Nasur as governor of the Central Province in January 1975, which placed him in charge of the campaign in Kampala. Nasur introduced a nation-wide system of "neighbour watches" where local committees in charge of the campaign in their areas encourage Ugandans to inform on each other for poor house-keeping and slovenliness in household cleanliness and dressing. Likewise, Nasur send out undercover policemen to arrest anyone found littering on the streets. Nasur was adamantly opposed to the practice of keeping farm animals within urban households and would order the destruction of any house that did not meet his standards of cleanliness during his weekly inspections of the neighborhoods of Kampala. Nasur became notorious for his campaign against "slippers" (the Ugandan term for sandals), which he deemed a "dirty" type of footwear that he sought to ban. One Ugandan woman recalled in 2005: "Nasur tortured people and he would not allow a person to walk in slippers...if they found you, they forced you to eat it". Most poor Ugandans could only afford sandals and the ban on sandals forced them to walk bare-foot. In January 1976, Kampala residents received a respite when Amin transferred Nasur over as governor of the Karamoja Province, but in August 1976 Nasur returned as the governor of the Central province, where he again pursued the "Keep Uganda Clean" campaign. During this time, Nasur conducted "spot checks" in Kampala where he ordered the demolition of any house or business that did not match his standards of cleanliness. As governor of the Central Province (the most populous of Uganda's provinces), Nasur was the official most identified with the "Keep Uganda Clean" campaign, but other provincial governors pursued similar policies of razing homes and businesses deemed "dirty".

The "Keep Uganda Clean" campaign was concerned not only with the elimination of "dirt" in Ugandan life, but also the elimination of all "dirty" behaviour in Uganda. "Dirty" behaviour was divided by Amin into two categories, namely being "lazy" and "cheating". "Lazy" people included all beggars, prostitutes, homeless people, single unemployed women (viewed by Amin as being very close to being prostitutes) and alcoholics while "cheaters" included people who engaged in tax evasion, smuggling, and hoarding. Such "parasites" as Amin labelled those engaged in "dirty" behaviour were rounded up by the police to be "roughed up" in order to teach to engage in "productive" and "clean" behaviour. In December 1974, Amin revised the criminal code of Uganda to outlaw all "idle and disorderly" behaviour in Uganda, which included being homeless, being a prostitute, begging and gambling in public. In the same degree, Amin also banned Ugandan women from wearing wigs, hot pants and miniskirts, which were also defined as "idle and disorderly" behaviour that was "dirty". In July 1975, Amin signed the Community Farm Settlement Decree, which ordered that all "unemployed able-bodied person" between the ages of 18-50 living in urban areas where to be resettled onto community farms where they would work in exchange for food. In 1977, the degree was amended by Amin to include anyone who was 12 or older living in an urban area "asking for alms or wandering about without any visible means of subsistence" and "unable to render a satisfactory account of himself." Despite Amin's visceral anti-British feelings, his policy of kasanvu (forced labour on the community farms)-which he justified as being for "bulungi bwa nsi" ("the good of the nation")-closely resembled the policy of forced labour in the British colonial era. The policy of kasanvu was heavily gendered with single urban women or unemployed married women being targeted for kasanvu. Nasur admitted to targeting women living in Kampala for kasanvu as he stated that a woman without husbands would be happier working for free on the community farms than living in a big city without men to support them. As a Muslim, Amin was uncomfortable with the sale and drinking of alcohol, and in August 1972 he sharply restricted the hours that bars could be open in an attempt to discourage drinking. The limits on bar hours instead encouraged binge drinking as Ugandans sought to consume as much alcohol as possible before the bars closed. Nasur during his time as governor of the Central Province banned the brewing and sale of alcohol in an attempt to stamp out drinking. Predicably, Nasur's prohibition on alcohol led to a surge of home brewed alcohol, which was covertly sold. As the majority of the home brewers were women, Nasur lashed out at the women of Kampala for promoting "anti-social behaviour" and warned in December 1976 that if home brewing did not stop immediately, "all unemployed nice-looking women will be rounded up."

In July 1974, Amin signed the Prevention of Hoarding Degree, making it illegal for shop owners to not sell to customers. Neither Amin nor anyone else in his regime understood that after the expulsion of the Indian merchants in 1972 that the Ugandan economy was in free fall, and distribution networks breaking down in the absence of the Indians that it was rational for people to hang onto any goods that might possess. The regime instead blamed the crisis on greed on the part of the "Black Asians" as black merchants were labelled. In March 1975, Amin decided to stamp out "dirty trade" by signing the Economic Crimes Tribunal Decree, which created military tribunals, staffed exclusively by Army officers, to try those accused of "dirty trade" practices. Those found guilty of smuggling, corruption or stealing foreign exchange were to be executed by firing squad, those found guilty of embezzlement were to a life sentence in prison; and those found guilty of hoarding or overcharging for goods were to receive 10 years in prison. Peter Jermyn Allen, the British judge who served as the Chief Justice of the Ugandan Supreme Court, justified the Economic Crimes Tribunal Decree in his 1987 memoirs as being necessary to give "those who were traitors to the economy and enemies of the State a fair trial before shooting them."

The group that suffered the most from Amin's efforts to combat "dirty" behaviour were unmarried women, especially those living in urban areas, who were viewed as a threat to the patriarchic Ugandan social order. The Amin regime had a strong misogynistic bend and regarded any single women who had a job as a significant social problem that needed to be stamped out. Typical of the regime's attitude towards single women was an editorial published in the Voice of Uganda newspaper on 17 March 1975 that read:

"Allow me a column to comment on town/city dwellers who think that to be free from marriage is to maintain more enjoyable life and comfort. Such women are the worse and are retarding the country's development...They spoil good married and working-class ladies. They cause divorce in married families. They are best venereal disease carriers. They are worse than kondos [armed robbers]. They employ themselves for the dirty game of gaining money for their bodies. They barter their bodies for either food, drinks, or social evenings. They bring famine to the country. They cause accidents. They cause abortions and kill young babies...They make town/city dirty by their dirty games...I call up the President to enact a decree for women to get married at certain age to stop this practice."

Women were always singled out as the supposed sources of rumors that were damaging the image of the Second Republic by working as "confusing agents". In a 1973 speech, Amin warned that "the imperialists are using Uganda girls as their tools to confuse the people" and the female "confusing agents" were the "enemies of the state" who would be executed. Amin in particular believed that Ugandan women were especially likely to work as spies for the foreign powers, which led him to threaten the execution of not only their supposed spies, but also their entire families as well. Amin was so convinced that Ugandan women who had studied abroad in foreign universities were being recruited to work as spies that in 1975 he banned all Ugandan women from studying abroad. Nasur in a speech blamed the rise in crime entirely upon unmarried women, saying that he would not tolerate the women who "refuse to get married and change men like dresses", saying he wanted unmarried women "to stop forthwith the practice of immoral conduct and settle down to productive occupation for national development." In October 1976, Nasur issued a degree for the arrest of all "girls" who were "indecently dressed" under the grounds that any women who was "indecently dressed" was a prostitute. Nasur did not distinguish between prostitutes and merely being unmarried, and in practice treated unmarried women as if they were prostitutes.

Stamping out prostitution was a major preoccupation for the regime, which notably never targeted the men who purchased the services of the prostitutes. In an editorial in 1977, the Voice of Uganda portrayed the johns as victims by claiming that prostitutes "lured" them out of their homes for sex. In one of his speeches, Amin blamed the rise in murders since he took power entirely upon the prostitutes. In an article in The Voice of Uganda in 1976, the journalist Wazarwahi Bwengye attacked women who filed for divorces under the grounds that women who "ran away" from marriage only did so to work as prostitutes, spread venereal diseases and "go back in rural areas to recruit others who still look upon marriage as an institution". Peter Nsubuga, the editor of The Voice of Uganda, wrote in a 1977 editorial: "Harlots, their work as it was, could get pregnant unexpectedly and no sooner did such women deliver than they threw away their kids in dustbins or elsewhere". In 1977, Amin signed the Venereal Diseases Decree, which gave the health authorities the right to detain anyone suspected of having a venereal disease who would not be released until they had paid for their own treatment. Through the Venereal Diseases Degree in theory applied to both sexes, The Voice of Uganda in an editorial praised the degree as the ideal weapon for ridding Uganda of prostitutes. Alongside this degree was a strong strain of xenophobia as Amin in his radio speeches accused foreign women of coming to Uganda to spread venereal diseases. In a 1978 speech, Amin warned of a supposed new strain of gonorrhea, which he claimed would kill men within six hours of infection, and admonished all Ugandan men to beware of "women with inviting eyes" from Tanzania, Rwanda and Kenya, whom he accused of being infected with the mythical strain of super-virulent gonorrhea. The regime also linked women to "imperialistic influences" by claiming that women most exposed to Western influences were the ones most likely to be infected with venereal diseases. The Keep Uganda Clean campaign also extended to married women accused of adultery, which was described as an "evil" practice caused by the adulterous wives being either greedy and/or "insatiable sex maniacs". Amin frequently warned married women in his speeches to "stop their habit of loving other men", which was a form of "dirty" behaviour that was undermining Ugandan society. The anti-adultery aspects of the Keep Uganda Clean campaign only extended to wives and never to husbands. The American historian Alica Decker wrote that the Keep Uganda Clean campaign as it pertained to women was an attempt in a viciously misogynistic way to uphold the traditional patriarchic Ugandan social order in face of the challenges posed by female employment and sexual liberation.

=== Radio ===
In 1965, about 112,69 Ugandans owned short-wave radio sets out of a population of six million. A survey taken that year showed that 8 out of every 10 adult Ugandans regularly listened to and received their news from to the state-owned Radio Uganda. In 1968, in an attempt to get around the independent-minded Ugandan newspapers, the government of Milton Obote placed a contract with a British firm that started construction of four 100 kilowatt transmitting towers to expand the reach of Radio Uganda. In November 1971, the construction of the four radio transmitting towers ordered by Obote were completed, which gave the Amin regime one of the most powerful radio broadcasting stations in Africa. The new regime had already banned private radio stations, making Radio Uganda the only radio broadcaster in the nation. Amin regularly spoke on Radio Uganda about whatever subject interested him at the moment, and this way almost all Ugandans knew his voice. Amin saw Radio Uganda as a way of reaching ordinary Ugandans and in February 1974 signed a contract with a Swiss firm to build two 250 kW radio transmitters to extend the reach of Radio Uganda abroad.

Amin was so addicted to speaking on Radio Uganda that he often announced on the basis of his whims major policy initiatives on Radio Uganda without informing his cabinet and senior bureaucrats, who would be left scrambling to explain and execute whatever policy the president had just announced on the radio. In 1971, diplomats in Kampala were already describing Amin's regime as "government by radio announcement". In his speech on Radio Uganda on 29 August 1972, Amin announced he was creating nine new provinces in Uganda; banned certain dances popular with teenagers, which he claimed "sapped the energy of our young people and encouraged drunkenness, laziness, disobedience to parents and other vices"; and announced new operating hours for bars and restaurants. In his speech on 15 May 1973 on Radio Uganda―which was very typical of Amin's speeches―he called upon two students from every one of Uganda's universities and colleges to meet him at the State House at 8:30 am the next day to discuss a new national language for Uganda to replace English; ordered his officials to start work for a water plant in Arua; ordered his Minister of Commerce and Industry to build a cement factory in Moyo; told the Yugoslav contractors building an airport in Arua to abandon the project and build a new hotel instead; ordered his Minister of Works and Housing to repair a crumbing bridge on the Wangi River; banned the practice of tipping waiters and waitresses; and finally ordered people living in the overpopulated areas in southern Uganda to move north to the underpopulated areas in northern Uganda. Amin announced all of these policy initiatives in his speech on Radio Uganda without any effort to inform anyone in the government in advance about what he was planning to say.

Government officials always listened to Radio Uganda when Amin spoke as this was the only way that they would learn of whatever policy the president had decided upon. Amin's practice of suddenly announcing new policy changes on the radio created widespread annoyance with ordinary Ugandans who complained about the arbitrary and capricious way Amin made policy. In his speech on Radio Uganda on the evening of 4 February 1974, Amin banned the practice of wearing wigs (in absence of hair dying, Ugandan women often wore blonde wigs), which he charged made "our women look unAfrican and artificial". A number of women had already gone out to the nightclubs wearing blonde wigs, and suddenly discovered that such wigs were now illegal as the police and soldiers badged in looking for women wearing wigs, which caused much anger about the way the policy was brought in on a whim without any effort at advance notice.

In his first speech on the new external broadcasting service of Radio Uganda in early 1975, Amin claimed that Radio Uganda made it possible to "effectively fight colonialism, neo-colonialism, capitalism and racism even better especially when we shall be reaching right into the enemy's camp". Besides Amin's speeches, other radio programs on Radio Uganda included such shows as "Presidential Quotations with Musical Bridges" and lectures on subjects such as "African Solidarity", "Liberation and the Liberators", "Economic Emancipation in Africa" and "Uganda's Economic War". Most notably, there were no comedy shows on Radio Uganda during Amin's rule as the possibility of mocking any aspect of Ugandan life was considered to be unbearable by the regime, and the Ministry of Information (which controlled Radio Uganda) ordered all journalists to promote "the gospel of truth" as defined by the president. Amin was noted for making outrageous and often bizarre statements in his speeches, which gave him the image abroad of being a buffoon. However, Leopold argued that far from being evidence of stupidity or even insanity as many Westerners argued at the time that Amin's outlandish statements were a calculated ploy. Amin clearly enjoyed being the center of world media attention, which he gained by making downright strange and buffoonish statements about a number of issues, and furthermore his outrageous speeches on Radio Uganda served to distract ordinary Ugandans from their collapsing economy. Perhaps the most notorious of Amin's speeches on Radio Uganda was a speech in April 1975 where he praised Adolf Hitler for the Holocaust, expressed regret that only six million Jews were exterminated, and announced plans to put up a statue of Hitler, though the planned statue was later cancelled when someone told Amin that Hitler also detested blacks.

The equipment of Radio Uganda was badly maintained, which required the staff of Radio Uganda to exert themselves to the utmost to keep the station broadcasting in spite of frequent breakdowns. Working on the station could be dangerous as anyone who failed to keep the station operating while Amin was speaking on the radio could face dire consequences, requiring the radio engineers to write letters to the Ministry of Information stating they were not trying to sabotage the broadcasting of Amin's speeches. As the 1970s went on and the Ugandan economy collapsed, it become more difficult to obtain the spare parts from abroad, which made it increasing difficult to keep Radio Uganda broadcasting. A report from the Director of Broadcasting in 1978 stated it was "demoralizing" for the journalists and radio engineers to keep the station operating in the face of the shortage of spare parts from abroad.

=== Terror ===
Karume Falls are open 24 hours [i.e. for disposal of bodies].

— An unnamed embassy official makes a cynical remark about state violence during Amin's regime.

Another near-obsession for Amin was the threat of a counter-attack by former president Obote. Shortly after the expulsion of Asians in 1972, Obote did launch such an attempt across the Tanzanian border into south-western Uganda. His small army contingent in twenty-seven trucks set out to capture the southern Ugandan military post at Masaka but instead settled down to await a general uprising against Amin, which did not occur. A planned seizure of the airport at Entebbe by soldiers in an allegedly hijacked East African Airways passenger aircraft was aborted when Obote's pilot blew out the aircraft's tires and it remained in Tanzania. Amin was able to mobilize his more reliable Malire Mechanical Regiment and expel the invaders.

Although jubilant at his success, Amin realized that Obote, with Nyerere's aid, might try again. He had the SRB and the newly formed Public Safety Unit (PSU) redouble their efforts to uncover subversives and other imagined enemies of the state. General fear and insecurity became a way of life for the populace, as thousands of people disappeared. In an ominous twist, people sometimes learned by listening to the radio that they were "about to disappear." A report by Amnesty International in 1979 concluded that between 100,000 to 500,000 Ugandans had been killed since 1971. The report stated: "Systematic and deliberate killings by government forces began in the first month of President Idi Amin's rule in Uganda...Those who were not killed outright or shortly after arrest were mostly tortured by the army, the intelligence service or a special police unit, and then killed...The victims included members of particular ethnic groups, religious leaders, judges, lawyers, students and intellectuals, and foreign nationals. The impunity with which the security forces were permitted to kill political opponents and criminal suspects created the conditions in which many other people were killed by members of the security forces for criminal motives or even arbitrarily".

State terrorism was evidenced in a series of spectacular incidents; for example, High Court Judge Benedicto Kiwanuka, former head of government and leader of the banned DP, was seized directly from his courtroom. Like many other victims, he was forced to remove his shoes and then bundled into the trunk of a car, never to be seen alive again. Whether calculated or not, the symbolism of a pair of shoes by the roadside to mark the passing of a human life was a bizarre yet piercing form of state terrorism.

On 5 February 1977, agents of the State Research Bureau stormed into the home of Janani Luwum, the Anglican bishop of Kampala, to accuse him of plotting with Obote against Amin. The raid led to a brave "open letter" signed by all of Uganda's Anglican bishops that criticised the Amin regime for its human right abuses. In response, agents of the State Research Bureau kidnapped Luwum whom it was announced had been killed in a car accident. The claim of an automobile accident was not widely believed either in Uganda or abroad. The murder of the widely respected Luwum was a turning point in the regime as it brought popular anger to bear and isolated Uganda internationally. Even governments such as Zambia, Ghana and Jamaica, which had fought against efforts to have Uganda expelled from the Commonwealth, criticised Amin for Luwum's murder. In the United Kingdom, a group of university students, human rights activists and Ugandan exiles founded the Uganda Action Group’ and the Uganda Group for Human Rights that sought to publicise the state of terror in Uganda. Just after the murder of Luwum, Amin announced his intention to visit London that June to attend the meeting of the Commonwealth leaders, which led to the government of Prime Minister James Callaghan to launch the secret Operation Bottle with the aim of keeping Amin from attending the Commonwealth summit.

=== Environment ===
During the eight years under Amin's rule, the Ugandan environment and ecological system was subjected to abuse and destruction by widespread poaching and deforesting committed by both smugglers and Uganda Army soldiers. Amin encouraged officers to engage in poaching and ivory trade, using these as benefits provided to troops in order to keep them loyal. Soldiers frequently engaged in poaching in national parks and game reserves. In course of the Uganda–Tanzania War, Uganda Army troops and Tanzanian soldiers hunted for food and profit across Uganda, causing further environmental damage. It is reported that Uganda lost 75% of its elephants, 98% of its rhinos, 80% of its crocodiles, 80% of its lions and leopards, in addition to numerous species of birds.

=== Palestinian hijackers of Air France Flight 139 ===
Amin attempted to establish ties with the Popular Front for the Liberation of Palestine – External Operations in June 1976, when he offered the Palestinian hijackers of an Air France flight from Tel Aviv a protected base at the old airport at Entebbe, from which to press their demands in exchange for the release of Israeli hostages. The dramatic rescue of the hostages by Israeli commandos was a severe blow to Amin. Humiliated, he retaliated against an elderly hostage—75-year-old Dora Bloch— who was hospitalized in poor health at the time of the raid and was left behind. Bloch was kidnapped from her hospital bed and killed on Amin's orders, along with the entire civilian staff of Entebbe airport.

=== Government ===
Amin's government, conducted by often erratic personal proclamation, continued on. Because he was illiterate his entire life — a disability shared with most of his fellow military officers and soldiers — Amin relayed orders and policy decisions orally by telephone, over the radio, and in long rambling speeches to which civil servants were told to pay close attention. The bureaucracy soon became paralysed as government administrators feared to make what might prove to be a wrong decision that would displease or anger Amin in the slightest which would result in their immediate arrest and imprisonment or summary execution.

Shortly after Amin seized power, the Minister of Defence demanded, and was given, command of the Ministry of Education office building, but then the decision was reversed by Amin for no clear reason. Important education files were lost during their transfer back and forth by wheelbarrow. In many respects, Amin's government in the 1970s resembled the governments of nineteenth-century African monarchs, with the same problems of enforcing orders at a distance, controlling rival factions at court, and rewarding loyal followers with plunder. Indeed, Amin's regime was possibly less efficient than those of the pre-colonial monarchs.

Religious conflict was another characteristic of the Amin regime that had its origins in the nineteenth century. After rediscovering his Islamic allegiance in the effort to gain foreign aid from Libya and Saudi Arabia, Amin began to pay more attention to the formerly deprived Muslims in Uganda, a move which turned out to be a mixed blessing for them. Muslims began to do well in what economic opportunities yet remained, the more so if they had relatives in the army. Construction work began on Kibuli Hill, the site of Kampala's most prominent mosque. Many Ugandan Muslims with a sense of history believed that the Muslim defeat by Christians in 1889 was finally being redressed. Christians, in turn, perceived that they were under siege as a religious group; it was clear that Amin viewed the churches as potential centres of opposition. A number of priests and ministers disappeared in the course of the 1970s, but the matter reached a climax with the formal protest against army terrorism in 1977 by Church of Uganda ministers, led by Archbishop Janani Luwum. Although Luwum's body was subsequently recovered from a clumsily contrived "car accident", subsequent investigations revealed that Luwum had been shot dead.

Then print some more.

— President Idi Amin when informed that his government had run out of foreign exchange.

This latest in a long line of atrocities was greeted with international condemnation, but apart from the continued trade boycott initiated by the United States in July 1978, verbal condemnation was not accompanied by action. In September 1978, Amin banned nearly all Christian Church activities for their subversiveness. By early 1978 Amin's circle of close associates had shrunk significantly — the result of defections and executions. Because of his violent temper as well as his erratic and unpredictable behaviour, it was increasingly risky to be too close to Amin, as his vice president and formerly trusted associate, General Mustafa Adrisi, discovered. When Adrisi was injured in a suspicious auto accident, troops loyal to him became restive. The once reliable Malire Mechanized Regiment mutinied, as did other units.

In October 1978, Amin sent troops still loyal to him against the mutineers, some of whom fled across the Tanzanian border. Amin then claimed that Tanzanian President Nyerere, his perennial enemy, had been at the root of his troubles. Amin accused Nyerere of waging war against Uganda, and, hoping to divert attention from his internal troubles and rally Uganda against the foreign adversary, Amin invaded Tanzanian territory and formally annexed a section across the Kagera River boundary on 1 November 1978.

=== Uganda–Tanzania War ===
Declaring a formal state of war against Uganda, Nyerere mobilized his citizen army reserves and counter-attacked, joined by Ugandan exiles united as the Uganda National Liberation Army (UNLA). The Ugandan Army retreated steadily, expending much of its energy by looting along the way. Libya's Gaddafi sent 3,000 troops to aid Amin, but the Libyans soon found themselves on the front line, while behind them Ugandan Army units were using supply trucks to carry their newly plundered wealth in the opposite direction. Tanzania and the UNLA took Kampala on 11 April 1979, and Amin fled by air, first to Libya and later to a permanent exile at Jeddah, Saudi Arabia. Though pro-Amin forces were left scattered and disjointed by the seizure of the capital, combat operations in the country continued until 3 June, when Tanzanian forces reached the Sudanese border and eliminated the last resistance.

=== Military rule under Amin ===
Military rule under Amin began after he overthrew President Milton Obote in a coup on the 25th of January 1971 while Obote was attending a conference in Singapore. Amin quickly took control of key installations in Kampala and Entebbe and eliminated opposition within the army especially Acholi and Langi soldiers loyal to Obote.

Amin transformed Uganda into a military dictatorship. Government institutions were placed under Army control, military officers occupied important government positions and military tribunals were given authority above civilian courts. Uganda was effectively ruled from military barracks across the country, while security agencies such as the State Research Bureau (SRB) and Public Safety Unit (PSU) carried out arrests, torture, killings, and enforced disappearances.

His regime was characterized by ethnic rivalry and violent purges within the army. Amin relied heavily on soldiers from his own West Nile region, especially Kakwa, Nubians, and Sudanese mercenaries. Thousands of civilians, political opponents, judges, religious leaders, and soldiers were killed during his rule. Among the most notable victims was Archbishop Janan Luwum.

Economically, Amin's government declined sharply after the 1972 expulsion of about 50,000 Asians from Uganda. Their businesses and property were seized, mostly benefiting army officers and Amin's supporters. Poor management and corruption led to the collapse of industries, reduced agricultural production, widespread smuggling, and severe economic crisis.

In Foreign Affairs, Amin shifted alliances from Western countries to Israel to Libya and Saudi Arabia. He adopted a strongly anti-Israel stance and receives support from Libyan leader Muammar Qadhafi. In 1976, Amin supported Palestinian hijackers during the Entebbe hostage crisis, though Israeli commandos later rescued the hostages.

Fear and insecurity dominated Uganda during Amin's rule. Government decisions were often made through personal orders and radio announcements, causing confusion and paralysis within the civil service. Religious tensions also increased as Amin favored Muslims while many Christians viewed the regime as hostile toward them.

== Public figures ==
- Mustafa Adrisi
- Isaac Muliyamungu
- Yusuf Gowon
- Juma Butabika

== See also ==
- Uganda–Tanzania War
- The Last King of Scotland, a book and film about living close to Amin
