= Ali Fadhul =

Ugandan military officer and government official (1940-2021)

- Ali Fadhul as brigadier

Uganda Army Chief of Staff
- In office March 1979 – April 1979
- President: Idi Amin
- Preceded by: Yusuf Gowon
- Succeeded by: De jure none; de facto David Oyite-Ojok as UNLA chief of staff

Minister for Provincial Administration
- In office c. 1974–1979
- President: Idi Amin

Governor of Northern Province
- President: Idi Amin

Personal details
- Born: c. 1940 British Uganda
- Died: 2 November 2021 (aged 81) Nsambya, Uganda
- Spouse: 10
- Children: 49

Military service
- Allegiance: Uganda
- Branch/service: King's African Rifles; Uganda Army (UA)
- Years of service: 1953–1979
- Rank: Brigadier
- Battles/wars: 1972 invasion of Uganda; Uganda–Tanzania War

Ali Fadhul (c. 1940 – 2 November 2021) was a Ugandan military officer and convicted criminal who served as governor, minister and army chief of staff during the dictatorship of President Idi Amin. In course of his career, he also commanded the Simba Battalion of the Uganda Army (UA). He was one of Amin's last loyal followers during the Uganda–Tanzania War of 1978–1979. Following the conflict, Fadhul was arrested by the new Ugandan government, and convicted of murder. Sentenced to death, he spent 22 years in prison until he was pardoned by President Yoweri Museveni in 2009.

== Biography ==
=== Military and political career ===
Waris Ali Fadhul or Ali Waris Fadhul (Note: He was named "Walls Ali Fadhul" by The New York Times reporter John Daimon.) was born in eastern Uganda, near the border to Kenya, around 1940. He was an ethnic Busoga, although he was often described as a "Sudanese" and spoke Nubian. He was forcibly recruited by the King's African Rifles in 1953; at the time he was thirteen. Following Uganda's independence in 1962, he transferred to the Uganda Army, serving throughout the presidency of Milton Obote. He took part in the 1971 Ugandan coup d'état that resulted in Obote's overthrow and initiated Idi Amin's presidency. At the time of the coup he was a corporal stationed in Moroto. Thereafter, he rose in the ranks. Described by researcher Andrew Rice as "an Amin confidante and notorious brute", Fadhul was granted command of the Uganda Army's Simba Battalion and tasked with eliminating soldiers loyal to the deposed President Obote. He consequently carried out several massacres of suspected dissident troops at the Simba barracks of Mbarara. In addition, he was possibly connected to the deaths of journalist Nicholas Stroh and Makerere University lecturer Robert Siedle. Amin promoted him to lieutenant colonel for his role in the purges of July 1971.

He was the head of the Simba Battalion from 1971 to 1974, although he was often absent from the unit. As a confidant of Amin, Fadhul repeatedly spent his time in Kampala to assist the President; his second-in-command Yusuf Gowon was thus responsible for the battalion's day-to-day operations. Fadhul later stated that he felt like a foreigner in southern Uganda, knowing neither local customs nor speaking the languages of Ankole. Facing latent insurgent activity, he reportedly relied on a number of civilian assistants to identify opponents of Amin's government. Early in the morning of 17 September 1972, Fadhul was informed of armed clashes at the Ugandan–Tanzanian border. He promptly took off for the border in a Peugeot sedan. As he was speeding toward the border, Fadhul ran into FRONASA rebels under the command of Yoweri Museveni. The rebels did not recognize him, allowing Fadhul to drive past them and get to the next telephone, and from there, he was able to inform Amin and the Simba Battalion of the rebel invasion. Afterwards, he went into hiding for a few days, only reemerging after the insurgents had been repelled by his subordinate Yusuf Gowon. After the fighting, he took part in purges of suspected rebels as well as rebel sympathizers in and around Mbarara, mostly hunting insurgents in the countryside while leaving Mbarara town to Gowon. Fadhul was later accused of having ordered the murder of Francis Xavier Tibayungwa, the former administrative secretary of Ankole, during this time. Tibayungwa was believed to have previously helped Museveni escape Uganda after the 1971 coup; the ex-official was bayonetted to death.

In the next years, Fadhul rose to governor in the northern (Acholi and Lango districts) and the western provinces (Ankole and Tooro districts). He was promoted to full colonel in May 1973, and also appointed head of the 2nd Infantry Brigade (renamed to "Simba Mechanized Brigade"). By 1974, he was Governor of Northern Province and "one of the most prominent figures in the regime" according to researcher Thomas Lowman. In this position, he mostly acted as an absentee official, often staying in Kampala and only involving himself in northern affairs by exhorting increases in cotton production, exploiting local smugglers and businesses, and suppressing rebel activity. He sometimes displayed a complete lack of knowledge of the activities of lower-ranking officials in his territories. Around 1974, he was appointed Minister for Provincial Administration. According to lower-ranking Ugandan smugglers, Fadhul exploited his military and government positions to directly participate in smuggling operations and illegally amass a fortune, while publicly condemning smugglers as "economic criminals" harming the country.

By the Uganda–Tanzania War of 1978–1979, he had been promoted to brigadier. In January 1979, he was featured in Ugandan radio propaganda: In his capacity as Minister for Provincial Administration, he had reportedly met Buganda elders during an official meeting with Amin, telling them how much the President respected them. In addition, Fadhul falsely claimed that the Uganda Broadcasting Corporation had not insulted foreign heads of state as Radio Tanzania had done, showcasing that Uganda was more dignified than its enemy. After the Tanzania People's Defence Force and allied rebel forces defeated the Uganda Army in a series of battles, President Amin dismissed Chief of Staff Gowon in March 1979. Fadhul was appointed his successor. In addition, he became part of a four-member war planning committee that oversaw the Ugandan preparations for the defense of Kampala. Amin's regime completely collapsed and Kampala was captured by Tanzanian-led forces in April 1979. A new Ugandan government was consequently installed. The new government subsequently froze the financial assets of over 1,000 Ugandan Nubians, including Fadhul's, before seizing the money and placing it in government accounts. Fadhul's home was plundered during the war. According to Thomas Lowman, Fadhul was arrested in Bombo. According to the Uganda National Liberation Front, journalist Godwin Matatu, and Indian diplomat Madanjeet Singh, he joined other regime officials in fleeing to Kenya.

=== Later life ===
Fadhul was arrested in his home in Bulumagi, Uganda, in September 1986 on charges that he had been involved in the murder of Tibayungwa. (Note: According to New Vision reporter Isaac Baligema, Fadhul was arrested "for crimes ranging from kidnap to murder" in 1980.) He was tried by the High Court in Mbarara in February 1988. Several witnesses testified that between 21 and 22 September 1972, they saw Fadhul arrest Tibayungwa and force him into a car, accusing him of working with rebels. He maintained his innocence during his trial, saying that all murders of civilians in Mbarara had been committed by his former colleague Yusuf Gowon. Fadhul was convicted and sentenced to death in 1989. Along with a leader of Amin's death squads, Kassim Obura, Fadhul was one of very few Amin followers who were ever actually convicted for crimes committed in the 1971–79 era. Placed on the death row at Luzira Upper Prison, he remained incarcerated for 22 years. The Supreme Court of Uganda turned down one of his appeals against the conviction and death sentence in 1993. However, his repeated appeals staved off his execution. In 2001, Yusuf Gowon was also imprisoned at Luzira, whereupon he and Fadhul developed such an antipathy that prison authorities had to separate them until Gowon was released.

In 2009, Fadhul was pardoned by President Yoweri Museveni, and released. By this time, he suffered from diabetes, ulcers and skin cancer and no longer had a home, as his old house in Bulumagi had been abandoned and vandalised during his time in prison. One house which had formerly belonged to him was now rented to the Weston College School-Makerere in Mukono; the college consequently allowed him to temporarily sleep in one of their offices. He later relocated to the home of his eldest wife, Hajjati Segiya Nako, in Bulumagi. Several locals and family members celebrated his release. By 2010, he could no longer sit, eat or walk on his own, and had to receive regular treatments at Nsambya Hospital and by doctors hired by his family to stay alive. However, he gave a number of interviews in which he offered "extravagant praise" for Museveni.

On 2 November 2021, Fadhul died at the Nsambya Hospital at the age of 81 due to complications from diabetes. The former chairperson of Bulumagi, Mohammed Kasule Byansi, lamented Fadhul's death, describing him as "great man in our society" who had supported locals by sponsoring education and helping individuals to enlist in the military. In contrast, The Australian's obituary by journalist Alan Howe described Fadhul as "murderer" and "Amin's most faithful servant".

== Personal life ==
Fadhul was married to at least ten women, and had at least 49 children, including Abubaker Ali Fadhul, Asha Ali, Faisal Fadhul, and Abdul Magid Alule. He was a polyglot, and spoke Nubian.
