= Kigwe =

Administrative ward in Tanzania

Coordinates: 6°06′S 35°29′E

Kigwe is an administrative ward in the Chamwino district of the Dodoma Region of Tanzania. According to the 2016 population estimates, the ward has a total population of 6,588.
