= RTD info =

European science magazine

RTD info was a quarterly magazine published by the European Commission that presented a mix of research results and debate on scientific subjects of interest to a wide, non-specialised readership. In 2007, the decision was made to change the name to research*eu. It lasted 63 issues, which are still available as PDF files. The common theme was Europe.

RTD info was published by the Communication Unit of the Research DG on paper in English, French (RDT info), and German (FTE info), and on the internet in these languages and Spanish (I+DT info). When the name was changed to research*eu, a Spanish translation was also printed. The magazine had its headquarters in Brussels. Michel Claessens served as the editor-in-chief of the magazine.
