= Radio Tanzania Dar es Salaam =

Tanzanian radio service

Radio Tanzania Dar es Salaam is a radio service in Tanzania.

== Background ==
In 1973, when the government of Tanzania was under the control of Julius Nyerere’s leadership, the country was primarily focused on establishing ujamaa, which means a socialistic familyhood. Accordingly, in an effort to get the citizens of Tanzania to develop their own unique popular music culture, Nyerere and his government banned most foreign music on national programs in 1973.bafana=*,xaid<er>"*,median,'frequency

== Radio Tanzania Dar Es Salaam (RTD) ==
Radio Tanzania Dar Es Salaam (RTD) became critical to the cultural life of Tanzania by nurturing Tanzania’s music scene. Since there was a chronic shortage of studio space and production equipment, RTD became the main advocate of Tanzanian musicians.

== Baraza la Muziki la Taifa (BAMUTA) ==
In addition to the creation of the RTD, in 1974 the government of Tanzania created BAMAUTA, which coordinated official national music policies, controlling musical instrument imports and issuing club and discothèque licences.

== Result ==
As a result of the RTD and BAMAUTA programs, many local Tanzanian bands became prominent and live entertainment was promoted. Dar es Salaam became the location where many popular African music styles were integrated, spurring the rise of the rap and hip hop culture in Dar es Salaam. President Nyerere opposed television during his time as head of Tanzanian government because he believed that it would widen the gap between the rich and poor citizens of his country. Accordingly, with the rise in television use in modern times, the importance of radio programs as a means of communicating social and political messages has diminished. However, although the role of the RTD and BAMAUTA may be decreasing in relation to the advent of television use, these two programs are primarily responsible for the development of hip hop and rap as a means of social communication in Tanzania that still exists today.
