= Uganda Army =

Uganda Army may refer to:

- Uganda Army (1962–1971), the country's first post-independence armed forces
- Uganda Army (1971–1980), the country's armed forces during the rule of Idi Amin until 1979 when it became a rebel group
- Former Uganda National Army, a rebel group that claimed to be the continuation of the 1971–1980 Uganda Army
- Uganda National Liberation Army, formed as rebel group in 1979 and acted as the country's official armed forces until 1986
- Uganda People's Defence Force, the current national armed forces of Uganda
