= Abdulatif Tiyua =

Ugandan military officer and rebel leader

- Born: Maracha District, Uganda
- Children: Several, including Leni Shida and Animu Angupale
- Military career
- Allegiance: Uganda
- Branch: Uganda Army; Uganda People's Democratic Army; Former Uganda National Army; West Nile Bank Front
- Service years: 1961–1979, 1986–1997
- Rank: Brigadier (Note: Though he was reportedly promoted to brigadier on 8 April 1979, many newspapers continued to describe Tiyua as lieutenant colonel during his subsequent career as rebel leader. One of the few exceptions, Africa Confidential, explicitly put "Brigadier" in quotation marks when referring to his rank.)
- Commands: Gondo Battalion; Eastern Brigade; West Nile Bank Front
- Conflicts: Uganda–Tanzania War; Invasion of Kagera; Battle of Mutukula; Battle of Tororo; War in Uganda (1986–1994); Second Sudanese Civil War; Operation Thunderbolt (1997)
- Other work: Chairman of a veterans association

Abdulatif Tiyua (Note: His name has also been transliterated Abdulatif Toya, Abdulatif Tiya, Abdallatif Tiyoa, Abudalatif Tiyoa, Abudahatiff, and Abdullatiff.) is a retired Ugandan military officer and former rebel leader. He served as a Uganda Army (UA) commander during the dictatorship of Idi Amin. When Amin was overthrown in 1979 during the Uganda–Tanzania War, Tiyua was imprisoned by the new Ugandan government. He was freed in 1985, when Tito Okello overthrew Ugandan President Milton Obote. When Okello was defeated by Yoweri Museveni's National Resistance Army, Tiyua joined an insurgency in northern Uganda, and eventually rose to deputy commander of the West Nile Bank Front rebel group. Following years of warfare, Tiyua was captured by rebels allied to the Ugandan government in southern Sudan in 1997, and was again incarcerated. After being released in 2000, he became chairman of a veterans association and has lobbied for his former rebel comrades to end their insurgency.

== Biography ==
=== Early life and career ===
Tiyua was born as a member of the Kakwa people in Maracha District, part of the West Nile Province of Uganda. He joined the Uganda Army in 1961, and was lieutenant by 1971. When Army commander Idi Amin ousted President Milton Obote in the 1971 coup d'état and installed himself as dictator, Tiyua remained in the military. Tiyua considered it his duty to obey the Commander-in-Chief, and thus did not question Amin's dictatorship. By 1977, he had risen to lieutenant colonel and commanded the 2nd Infantry Battalion, better known as Gondo Battalion, stationed in Moroto.

=== Uganda–Tanzania War ===
Map of the battles of the Uganda–Tanzania War

When the Uganda–Tanzania War broke out in October 1978, Tiyua served as second-in-command to Yefusa Bananuka who officially headed the Gondo Battalion by this point. Tiyua was sent with parts of the Gondo Battalion to the Tanzanian border to aid the Ugandan Invasion of Kagera, while Bananuka stayed behind in eastern Uganda. Tanzania repelled the invasion, and launched a counter-offensive in January 1979 that targeted the border town of Mutukula. By this time, Tiyua had risen to lieutenant colonel, and once again served as second-in-command to Bananuka who had finally joined the troops at the front.

The Battle of Mutukula went badly for the Ugandans who were overwhelmed by the Tanzanian forces in a matter of hours. While the fighting was still ongoing, the Gondo Battalion retreated against the orders of the Ugandan high command. Tiyua subsequently stated that Bananuka had ordered the withdrawal, whereas the latter accused Tiyua of lying and being responsible for the retreat. Despite this failure, Tiyua was put in command of the 1st Infantry Brigade, generally known as the Eastern Brigade. Following the defeat at Mutukula, the Eastern Brigade's troops were stationed at Sanje to reinforce the frontline. By March 1979, Tiyua and the rest of the Eastern Brigade were stationed at Mbale in eastern Uganda.

On 2 March 1979, Ugandan insurgents loyal to ex-President Obote launched a raid into Uganda from Kenya, attacking the town of Tororo. Part of its garrison revolted and defected to the attackers. In course of the following battle, the rebels captured Tororo. Upon hearing of this, Tiyua rallied his troops and launched a counter-attack alongside other Ugandan military units, routing the insurgents and retaking Tororo on 4 March. This marked one of the few Ugandan victories during the Uganda–Tanzania War. On 8 April 1979, President Amin personally visited Tororo, and promoted Tiyua to brigadier for his role in the fighting.

Uganda's military situation continued to deteriorate over the following weeks. On 10 April, the Tanzanians and their rebel allies assaulted Kampala, the Ugandan capital, and Amin fled his home country. Before escaping via airplane to Libya, Amin travelled to Mbale, where he urged Tiyua and his men to continue fighting. Tiyua obeyed this order, although most of his troops deserted in the next days. Realizing that he could offer no more resistance to the advancing Tanzanians, Tiyua and about 100 of his remaining troops crossed the border to Kenya. They hoped to reach Sudan by foot, and then travel back to their home areas in the West Nile sub-region. The Kenyans arrested Tiyua and his soldiers, however, and they were extradited to Uganda.

=== Imprisonment, opposition and later life ===
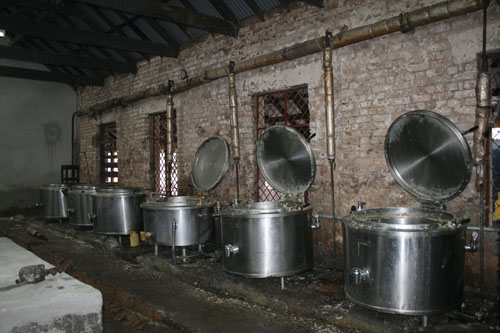
A kitchen at the Luzira Maximum Security Prison before its renovation in the 2000s

As he had been one of the last Uganda Army commanders to lay down his weapons, Uganda's new government under Yusuf Lule (and later restored President Obote) considered Tiyua a criminal. He was imprisoned at the Maximum Security Prison of Luzira, and condemned to death without court procedure. Tiyua stated that he and other prisoners were mistreated and were not given adequate access to food, space, or medicine. He remained on the prison's death row until 1985, when Obote was overthrown by Tito Okello amid the Ugandan Bush War. Okello released Tiyua and other political prisoners, and he returned to his family's home in Arua District.

Okello's military government was in turn overthrown by Yoweri Museveni's National Resistance Army in 1986. Instead of waiting to see how the new regime would treat him, Tiyua opted to flee into southern Sudan. At the time, rumours circulated that Museveni hated the former Uganda Army soldiers from the West Nile region. Museveni's private army FRONASA had committed several massacres against Muslims and people from West Nile during the Uganda–Tanzania War. Believing that Museveni intended to kill West Nile natives, Tiyua decided to join the Uganda People's Democratic Army (UPDA), a rebel alliance formed by ex-forces of various former Ugandan governments. The UPDA soon split, and Tiyua joined the Former Uganda National Army (FUNA). He served as one of the group's leaders by 1990, serving alongside Isaac Lumago and Dusman Sabuni. Tiyua eventually became the deputy commander of the West Nile Bank Front (WNBF), serving as its "chief administrator" under the overall leadership of Juma Oris.

Tiyua later claimed that he regretted joining the anti-Museveni rebellion, retrospectively regarding it as "time and life lost" fighting a "futile war". Drawn into numerous regional wars, including the Second Sudanese Civil War, the WNBF's fortunes declined over time. In March 1997, the group suffered a major defeat during Operation Thunderbolt. Tiyua and several of his fighters were captured by SPLA rebels in the Sudanese city of Yei on 13 March 1997. The SPLA was allied to Museveni, and extradited Tiyua to Uganda. After initially being detained in Kampala, Tiyua was again incarcerated in the Maximum Security Prison of Luzira, but expressed his hope that Museveni would pardon him. Though set free on 21 April 1999, he was immediately re-arrested, and was finally released on 21 June 2000.

Following his release, Tiyua became the chairman of an ex-combatants association in Arua. Since then, he has lobbied for former WNBF fighters who still live as insurgents to lay down their weapons. In 2009, President Museveni promised to provide USh 250 million (~US$127,500 ) to maintain Tiyua's office as well as USh 5 million (~US$2,500) for every ex-WNBF fighter as gratuity. The Ugandan government subsequently organized "resettlement packages" for ex-rebels in the West Nile sub-region, consisting of USh 250,000 and some goods, but soon suspended the distribution of these packages due to many ex-insurgents reportedly cheating the system by presenting family members as former combatants to get more than they were due. Tiyua condemned the suspension, arguing that there were many more former rebels than the government admitted, and that the ex-combatants were not cheating the system. In subsequent years, Tiyua publicly urged the Ugandan government to pay WNBF veterans a regular pension to ensure that they would not resume their insurgency. The government eventually agreed to do so in 2018, whereupon Tiyua applauded its decision.

== Personal life ==
Tiyua is a Muslim and has several children and grandchildren. His daughters include professional sprinter Leni Shida and Animu Angupale, who served as Arua District Woman MP in the Seventh Parliament of Uganda.
