= Dusman Sabuni =

Ugandan military officer and rebel leader

- Born: Lira, British Uganda
- Died: c. 2000; Mombasa, Kenya
- Burial place: Mombasa
- Children: 3
- Military career
- Allegiance: Uganda; FUNA; ADF
- Branch: Uganda Army
- Service years: 1968–1979; 1980s–1998/99
- Rank: Brigadier general
- Commands: Paratroopers Military School; NALU
- Conflicts: 1972 invasion of Uganda; Uganda–Tanzania War; Fall of Kampala; War in Uganda (1986–1994); ADF insurgency

Dusman Abassi Sabuni (Note: "Sabuni" is translated from Kiswahili as "soap".) (died c. 2000) was a Ugandan military officer and rebel militant leader. He is known for serving as one of the first leaders of the Allied Democratic Forces (ADF), an Islamist rebel group based in western Uganda and eastern Democratic Republic of the Congo, during the 1990s.

Born in Lira, Uganda, he became an officer in the Uganda Army following the completion of his secondary schooling. After Idi Amin's 1971 military coup, Sabuni quickly rose through the ranks and was made brigadier general and minister of industry. Sabuni fled the country in 1979 after Amin's overthrow during the Uganda–Tanzania War, but was detained by Kenyan authorities and sent back to Uganda. Sources disagree on the details of his later life, though it is known that he served as a senior rebel leader in the 1990s.

== Early life ==
Dusman Sabuni was born in Lira, Uganda. He was ethnically Moru, and his father was a police commissioner, also called Dusman Sabuni. He received his secondary education at Gulu High School and played on the institution's football team before graduating in 1967. In the 1970s he married and had three children. He was a Muslim.

== Military career ==
In 1968, Sabuni enrolled in the Uganda Army as an officer cadet. He underwent training in Moroto before being sent to the Royal Military Academy Sandhurst in the United Kingdom for further instruction. In 1969, he partook in a three-month long paratrooper course at Malire Barracks in Kampala. He was ultimately commissioned into the army as a second lieutenant. Sabuni still held the rank when Colonel Idi Amin launched a military coup in 1971. Shortly thereafter Sabuni was promoted to the rank of captain. He later attended a company commanders' course at the Kabamba School of Infantry. While there, he was promoted to major. Before he finished the course, he was promoted to lieutenant colonel and attached to Uganda Army headquarters. Shortly after taking up the post Sabuni was made colonel. Several months later he was made brigadier general and appointed minister of industry. He also underwent paratrooper training in Israel and for a time served as commander of the Paratroopers Military School in Lubiri. In July 1976 he, in his capacity as minister of industry, led a delegation to Japan where they secured a deal with Honda to purchase vehicles for the Ugandan government.

In 1979, during the Uganda–Tanzania War a combined force of Tanzanian troops and Ugandan rebels invaded Uganda and approached the capital, Kampala. Amin fled the city and left Sabuni in charge of its defence. Kampala ultimately fell, and Sabuni fled to Kenya. The circumstances of his flight are disputed. According to his own testimony, he fled Kampala on 8 April 1979, and went to Mbale from where he and his family traveled to the border, crossing it on 10 April. Eyewitnesses claimed to have seen him in Mbale as late as 11 April, however, where he, Idi Amin, and other high-ranking officials allegedly plundered the African Textile Mills. Furthermore, Sabuni claimed that he stayed at Molo after his escape until being detained by Kenyan agents and sent to Kakamega, whereas diplomat Madanjeet Singh stated that Sabuni was staying in Nairobi after fleeing Uganda. He was arrested by local authorities in May after being indicted by the Kampala chief magistrate for murder and extradited back to Uganda on 16 June.

== Later life ==
Sources do not agree on Sabuni's fate after his return to Uganda. According to some reports, he was incarcerated at Luzira Prison by the Uganda National Liberation Front before starving to death in their custody in 1981. His father was killed by UNLF troops in 1980. According to journalist Anne Mugisa, Sabuni was released in Uganda but arrested and charged with breaking into and stealing from the African Textile Mills in Mbale. He was ultimately acquitted on 17 December 1981, and then moved back to Kenya, going to Mombasa and reportedly remarrying. According to Sabuni's lawyer Joe Mayanja and journalist Innocent Kazooba, Sabuni was still in Luzira Prison when Yoweri Museveni came to power in Uganda and Museveni had him released. Sabuni then fled to Zaire and then Saudi Arabia. By 1990, he had joined a Ugandan rebel group operating in Zaire, the Former Uganda National Army (FUNA), and served as one of its leaders alongside Isaac Lumago and Abdulatif Tiyua. Sabuni flew to Nairobi briefly in 1997 but, after being prevented by Kenyan authorities from leaving the premises of Jomo Kenyatta International Airport, he flew back to Saudi Arabia. He later became chief of staff of the Allied Democratic Forces (ADF), a Ugandan Islamic fundamentalist rebel group, using the pseudonym "Al Hajji Osman". He was replaced in 1998 after falling ill and being forced to retire to a hospital in Mombasa. Ugandan military sources stated that he was leading an ADF subgroup, NALU, by 1999.

According to journalist Yunusu Abbey, Sabuni died from a stroke in Mombasa in 1999 and was buried in the city. According to Mugisa, he died there in 2000.
