= Hussein Mohammed =

Ugandan military officer

- Military career
- Allegiance: Uganda
- Branch: Uganda Army
- Service years: ?–1979
- Commands: Eagle Colonel Gaddafi Battalion
- Conflicts: Uganda–Tanzania War; Battle of Tororo

Hussein Mohammed (Note: His name has also been spelled "Jussein".) was an Ugandan military officer who served as commander of the Uganda Army's Eagle Colonel Gaddafi Battalion, stationed in Jinja, during the rule of Idi Amin.

== Biography ==
Hussein Mohammed was a Muslim as well as a Nubian and/or Kakwa. At some point, he joined the Uganda Army, and rose in the ranks despite being illiterate, serving as corporal by 1968. Ugandan Colonel Bernard Rwehururu speculated that Hussein was deeply involved in the preparations of the 1971 Ugandan coup d'état which brought Amin to power. He quickly rose to higher commands under the new regime, though the exact timing of his promotions is disputed. Rwehururu stated that Hussein was directly promoted to lieutenant colonel after the coup, whereas businessman Conrad Nkuutu claimed that Hussein was a colonel and served as "Garrison Commander" of the Gaddafi Barracks in Jinja by 1973. Journalist Faustin Mugabe described Hussein as lieutenant colonel and "Commanding Officer" in Jinja by March 1974. In contrast, the BBC reported that Hussein was still major by 1975, and was appointed lieutenant colonel in April of that year.

In any case, Hussein played an important role in quelling dissent during Amin's rule. In January 1973, Military Intelligence officers kidnapped Minister for Works Shaban Nkutu at Jinja. Nkutu's family asked Jinja's District Commissioner Mzee Hezron Kakuyo for help. Suspecting that the Gaddafi Battalion was involved in the minister's disappearance, Kakuyo contacted Hussein. The two met at Crested Crane Hotel, where Hussein angrily rebuffed Kakuyo's appeals for Nkutu's life, falsely claiming that the minister "has already been freed by the army and returned to his residence at Rippon Gardens (Jinja). Find him there and never ask me about him again!" Idi Amin's government later declared Nkutu a traitor; the minister's body was eventually found floating in the Nile.

In March 1974, Amin was almost overthrown in a coup attempt. To appease the disquieted soldiery, he appointed Mustafa Adrisi Chief of Staff. Adrisi promptly vowed to "crack down on errant soldiers" who abused their power, one of whom was Amin's own brother Idi Nebbi (alias "Moshe Amin"). To teach the latter a lesson, Adrisi forced Nebbi into the boot of his car and ordered him driven to Jinja. Upon arriving there, the driver reported to Hussein who telephoned the Chief of Staff, telling him that "your driver has reported to me with the 'luggage' inside the boot." He then sent the two back to Adrisi. Terrified by the experience, Nebbi consequently behaved better; other soldiers heard of the story, and discipline in the Uganda Army improved.

In April 1975, Hussein was promoted to head of the entire Gaddafi Battalion by President Amin during a meeting at Nakasero officers' mess, succeeding Isaac Maliyamungu. When the Uganda–Tanzania War broke out, the Gaddafi Battalion helped to secure eastern Uganda. Rebels crossed the border and attacked the town of Tororo on 2–4 March 1979. The Gaddafi Battalion helped to repulse the raid. Regardless, the war turned against Uganda, and the country's capital Kampala fell to the Tanzania People's Defence Force (TPDF) and allied rebels on 10–11 April 1979. The new Ugandan government was installed and appealed to the remaining Uganda Army forces to give up. Hussein was reportedly inclined to do so, and addressed his men at the Gaddafi Battalion barracks. A police officer later claimed that many soldiers were violently opposed to surrender, as they belonged to the West Nile tribes and feared execution as partisans of Amin. Fighting broke out among the troops, and the battalion disintegrated. With his troops no longer following orders, Hussein deserted his post and fled to Kenya in early April, accompanied by "many" other soldiers of the battalion. He surrendered at the border crossing of Malaba. The Kenyan government granted him asylum, and he consequently relocated to Nairobi. According to journalist Jonathan C.R., Hussein's defection was "the final proof that Amin was abandoned by all but the diehards". His flight reportedly left "no one" in control of Jinja. Regardless, some troops of the Gaddafi Battalion continued to resist until Jinja was captured by the TPDF on 22 April 1979.
