= Battle of Tororo =

Battle of the Uganda–Tanzania War

- Part of the Uganda–Tanzania War
- Battle of Tororo (Uganda)
Date	2–4 March 1979
Location	Tororo, Uganda
Result	Ugandan government victory

Belligerents
Ugandan rebels	Uganda

Commanders and leaders
Lorne Owere	Idi Amin; Abdulatif Tiyua; Hussein Mohammed

Units involved
Forces of National Revolt; Air and Sea Battalion mutineers	Air and Sea Battalion loyalists Gaddafi Battalion; Eastern Brigade; Uganda Army Air Force

Strength
~200 FNR guerrillas Unknown number of mutineers	Unknown

Casualties and losses
30–50 FNR guerrillas killed unknown captured	400+ killed (FNR claim)
- 10 FNR guerrillas were arrested by Kenyan police and later expelled from their territory. An unspecified number of Ugandan government soldiers were interned by Kenyan authorities and sent back into Uganda.

The Battle of Tororo was a battle of the Uganda–Tanzania War that took place from 2 to 4 March 1979 at Tororo, Uganda and its surroundings. It was fought between Ugandan rebels loyal to Milton Obote and Uganda Army units loyal to President Idi Amin. In an attempt to destabilise Amin's rule and capture weapons for an insurrection, a group of guerrillas launched a raid from Kenya against Tororo, whose garrison partially mutinied and joined them after a brief fight. Loyalist Ugandan military forces, most importantly its air force, launched a large-scale counter-attack and defeated the rebels after heavy fighting.

== Background ==
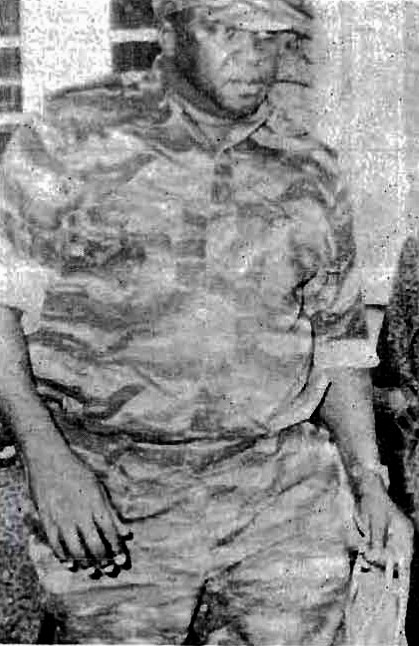
Idi Amin (1977)

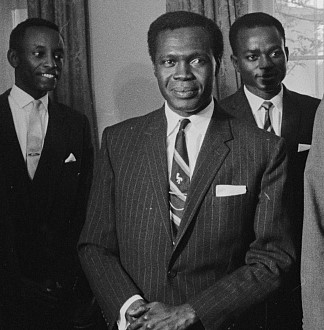
Milton Obote (center, 1962)

In 1971 Idi Amin launched a military coup that overthrew the President of Uganda, Milton Obote, precipitating a deterioration of relations with the neighbouring state of Tanzania. Amin installed himself as president and ruled the country under a repressive dictatorship. Obote and other Ugandans opposed to Amin fled into neighbouring countries, where they organised militant opposition groups and planned to initiate an insurgency. Their efforts were of little effect until Amin launched an invasion of Tanzania in October 1978. Tanzania blunted the assault, mobilised anti-Amin opposition groups, and launched a counter-offensive.

After the Tanzania People's Defence Force (TPDF) had defeated the Uganda Army in a number of battles, Obote was confident that the Ugandan people would soon take up arms and launch a popular uprising against Amin, allowing the native opposition groups to capture Uganda's capital, Kampala. Tanzanian President Julius Nyerere initially supported Obote's plan. He believed that it would reflect poorly on Tanzania's image abroad if the TPDF were to occupy Kampala and overthrow another country's government. As his army further progressed into Uganda, he drew up plans whereby the Tanzanians would advance to Kampala's outskirts, destroying Amin's forces along the way, and allowing members of Obote's Kikosi Maalum to seize the capital with minimal resistance.

Working in Dar es Salaam, Obote gathered support to launch a new war front in Uganda. To incite the popular revolt and capture weaponry for their cause, a group of Obote's followers—collectively known as the Forces of National Revolt (FNR)—thus decided to launch a raid from Kenya into Uganda in early March 1979. An earlier attempt by other guerrillas to infiltrate the country from Kenya in January had failed when a boat sank and dozens of fighters drowned. (Note: According to Kenneth Ingham, about 100 militants actually made it across the lake, and hid in Kisumu for one week. They then crossed into Uganda, and attempted to incite a revolt at Tororo, but failed and retreated.) This time the FNR targeted Tororo, a town located in eastern Uganda which served as a major commercial and transport hub. Its capture by rebels would sever the road and railway lines from Kenya to Uganda. As Uganda received crucial civilian and military supplies from Kenya, which was supportive of Amin during the Uganda–Tanzania War, this would have been a major blow to Idi Amin's government.

Tororo was garrisoned by the Uganda Army's Air and Sea Battalion which was understrength, counting between 1,000 and 2,000 soldiers. It included a significant number of soldiers who had become dissatisfied with Amin's regime. (Note: The Air and Sea Battalion had mutinied in 1978 over soldiers' loss of privileges and irregular delivery of pay.) There were rumours that many soldiers in eastern Uganda were ready to revolt, and that they would muster at Tororo if the opportunity presented itself.

Obote's men prepared by stockpiling weapons in the bush near the Kenyan-Ugandan border and gaining the sympathy of Tororo civilians and anti-Amin soldiers of the garrison. In the process the Uganda Army became aware of a potential external assault and thus trenches were dug around the barracks. Obote made a unity pact with Ateker Ejalu's Save Uganda Movement (SUM) and the two agreed to undertake the attack jointly. They informed the Tanzanian government of their intentions, and it approved of the plan. However, the Organisation of African Unity began an attempt to mediate the conflict between Tanzania and Uganda. Nyerere requested that Obote advance the operation sooner, so as to emphasise that Amin was struggling with internal opposition. Obote assented but failed to inform Ejalu of the change. Obote's followers later claimed that SUM had not been able to organize the agreed number of fighters for the operation, resulting in FNR acting on its own. SUM member Paul Oryema Opobo claimed that Obote's forces were instead worried over SUM's successes in the war, and wanted to sabotage SUM's plans to invade eastern Uganda. Thus, they launched the Tororo raid alone to prevent SUM from gaining any recognition.

Some of the rebels who were involved in the Tororo operation were reportedly also housed at a farm in Bondo District which belonged to Kenyan opposition leader Jaramogi Oginga Odinga.

== Battle ==
The raid was undertaken by about 200 guerrillas who were disguised in old Uganda Army uniforms. (Note: Shortly after the battle, "exile sources" claimed that only 100 exiles were involved in the raid.) The operation was led by Captain Lorne Owere, a former SUM member and ex-Uganda Army Air Force pilot. Fearing interception by Kenyan border guards, only the leaders crossed overland into Uganda. The main force crossed via boat and landed on the shore and nearby islands. They split up into small groups and were sheltered by sympathetic villagers until it was time to launch the attack. They later arrived at the Air and Sea Battalion's barracks which were 1 1/2 miles from Tororo. The battle was initiated by mutineers among the Air and Sea Battalion who opened fire on their comrades around 6 a.m. on 2 March 1979. Upon hearing the sound of gunfire, the guerrillas stormed the barracks. Combat was initially confined to the military camp, with the mutineers setting fire to the barracks. Despite having support from the Uganda Army Air Force, the Amin loyalists were routed after an hours-long battle. About 50 people were killed in the fighting, mostly civilians. Many locals responded to the outbreak of violence by fleeing from Tororo to nearby Mbale. The Mbale hospital treated both military and civilian casualties.

After securing the town and its armoury, the guerrillas attempted to evacuate the captured weapons and ammunition, but were not able to do so as they did not have enough suitable vehicles. (Note: In contrast, journalist John Worrall stated that the rebels had "escaped with large quantities of arms and ammunition".) They had planned on using the barracks' vehicles to move the materiel to the bush, but none were found—apparently having already been taken by fleeing Ugandan officers. Amin responded to the attack by mobilising his approximately 2,000 troops west of Kampala to blunt further rebel advances into Uganda. By the afternoon on 2 March, the loyalist Gaddafi Battalion under Lieutenant Colonel Hussein Mohammed had launched a counter-attack from its base at Jinja. Having commandeered a large number of civilian vehicles, the Gaddafi Battalion rushed toward Tororo, and soon met resistance by mutinous troops who had themselves advanced toward Kampala along the road. Both sides set up roadblocks, and locals reported that "heavy fighting" took place between the mutineers and the Gaddafi Battalion. An alleged guerrilla leader later stated that the Uganda Army soldiers proved to be poorly trained, claiming that the loyalists "drove in lorries [trucks] right into our ambushes and we slaughtered them." The loyalists were then further reinforced by Lieutenant Colonel Abdulatif Tiyua's Eastern Brigade from Mubende. (Note: According to journalist John Worrall, the second loyalist unit came from "Mortoro".) On 3 March, a group appeared in Nairobi, Kenya, claiming to represent the Air and Sea Battalion and calling for an uprising by the army and people of Uganda against Amin, and the restoration of Obote to the presidency.

We repulsed the enemy that had attacked our forces and they fled back into Kenya. We were stronger than them and that is why they fled. I don't know whether they wanted to advance to Kampala or just wanted to hold territory. I don't know what their motive was.

— Abdulatif Tiyua, Eastern Brigade commander, about the battle at Tororo

By 4 March, the Gaddafi Battalion had managed to encircle many of the rebels at the barracks of Tororo, inflicting heavy casualties on them. (Note: Unidentified exile sources attributed the guerrillas' defeat to the Air and Sea Battalion loyalists.) The defeat of the insurgents was ensured when the Uganda Army Air Force's MiGs started a mass bombardment of the area on the orders of President Amin. The bombardment by the MiGs "flattened" the barracks. However, the government aircraft made no distinction between the rebels, loyalists, and civilians, instead attacking everyone; the battle thus descended into complete chaos, as a large number of guerrillas, army forces, and locals fled into Kenya to escape the air strikes. Kenyan border police and soldiers guarded the border, waiting to intercept them. Several were subsequently rounded up and arrested by Kenyan authorities, though others managed to escape into the forest. Raid leader Owere was among the operation's survivors. The few rebels who remained behind in Uganda were captured or killed by Ugandan security forces. Between 30 and 50 FNR guerrillas were killed in the attack, while 10 of them were arrested by Kenyan police and expelled from the country. The interned Ugandan soldiers were released back into their country.

== Aftermath ==
The battle at Tororo was a defeat for the insurgents loyal to Obote, proving their incapability to either defeat the already weakened and disorganised Amin loyalists or inspire a popular uprising in Uganda. They also failed to recover a significant number of weapons or disrupt cross-border road transportation; within two days Kenyan oil trucks had resumed their regular routes through the area. The government-loyal Radio Kampala boasted that the military had "crushed and killed all the aggressors", while someone working at the military headquarters of Entebbe described the battle as "a butchery". On 8 April 1979, President Amin personally visited Tororo, and promoted Abdulatif Tiyua to brigadier for his role in the fighting. The failure of the raid provoked severe disagreement between the FNR and the SUM, the latter blaming the former for the defeat. The FNR released a statement in Nairobi, claiming to have killed at least 400 Ugandan troops and destroyed the Tororo barracks. In contrast, SUM member Paul Oryema Opobo described the raid as "uncalled for" and only succeeding in "altert[ing] Idi Amin-Dada about the dangers against him coming from Eastern Uganda".

A report of the Tororo raid was later discovered in the files of the State Research Bureau, Amin's secret police organisation. Authored by a police intelligence officer, it detailed that suspicious persons were observed on 1 March transporting packages over the Kenyan border. The Ugandans suspected that it was guerrillas smuggling arms, and requested that Kenyan police interdict them. The Kenyan authorities allegedly promised to arrest such persons, but failed to capture anyone. The officer wrote that the following morning he was informed that the Tororo barracks had been attacked and that the local police had deserted their posts. He also recorded that he had later interrogated four critically wounded guerrillas, but that they had died before giving him any substantial information.

The Libyan Ambassador to Uganda, I. S. Ismael, believed that the battle showed that Uganda's military situation was improving. (Note: Since February, Libyan troops were flown into Uganda to assist Amin's forces.) President Amin was reportedly heartened by the victory at Tororo. As result, the Uganda Army's commanders were able to convince him to sanction a large counter-offensive at Lukaya to drive back the Tanzanians. Despite its victory over Obote's followers, however, Amin's regime was in terminal decline and its military disintegrating. The mutiny at Tororo inspired other army units to revolt, while the raid spread panic among Ugandan troops and forced Amin to draw resources away from the southern front. (Note: For these reasons, journalists Tony Avirgan and Martha Honey considered the raid a partial success.) The weakened Uganda Army suffered further defeats at the hands of the Tanzanians in the Battles of Lukaya and Entebbe. By April, many towns throughout Uganda, including Tororo, were surrendering to various insurgent groups or the TPDF without resistance. Kampala fell on 11 April, and Amin subsequently fled the country. Brigadier Tiyua and his forces (by then just 100 soldiers) were among the last elements of the Uganda Army to surrender; as result, he was treated as a war criminal by the new Ugandan government and eventually joined a rebel group consisting of ex-Amin loyalists. A rebel veteran of the battle at Tororo, Patrick Masette Kuya, participated in the Moshi Conference that led to the establishment of Uganda's first post-Amin government.
