= Battle of Jinja =

Battle of the Uganda–Tanzania War that took place on 22 April 1979

Coordinates: 0.423333°S 33.203889°E

- Part of the eastern campaign of the Uganda–Tanzania War
- Battle of Jinja (Uganda)
Date	22 April 1979
Location	Jinja and surroundings, Uganda
Result	Tanzanian-UNLF victory
Territorial changes	Jinja occupied by Tanzanian-UNLF forces

Belligerents
Tanzania; Uganda National Liberation Front	Uganda

Commanders and leaders
Mwita Marwa; Salim Hassan Boma	Unknown (Note: The leadership situation in Jinja remained unclear after Lieutenant Colonel Hussein Mohammed's desertion in early April. Some Uganda Army commanders were known to present in the town until its capture by the Tanzanians, including Mohammed Sebbi and air force chief Lieutenant Colonel Andrew Mukooza. A captured Ugandan soldier told the Tanzanians that the roadblock at the Owen Falls Dam was under the command of a major. Journalist Nelson Bwire Kapo alleged that Idi Amin had haphazardly planned the city's defense before fleeing.)

Units involved
208th Brigade	Eagle Colonel Gaddafi Battalion

Strength
3,000; 3 tanks	200–2,000

Casualties and losses
1 wounded	Unknown killed or wounded ~6 captured 1 field gun destroyed
- 2 civilians killed

The Battle of Jinja was a battle of the Uganda–Tanzania War that took place on 22 April 1979 near and in the city of Jinja, Uganda between Tanzanian and allied Uganda National Liberation Front forces on the one hand, and Ugandan troops loyal to Idi Amin on the other. The Tanzanians and the UNLF men met slight resistance and captured Owen Falls Dam and the town of Jinja.

Idi Amin had seized power in Uganda in 1971 and established a brutal dictatorship. Seven years later he attempted to invade neighbouring Tanzania to the south. The attack was repulsed, and the Tanzanians launched a counter-attack into Ugandan territory. After a number of battles, Amin's regime and military largely collapsed, and Kampala, the capital, was seized by the Tanzanians and the UNLF. Ugandan troops fled to the eastern city of Jinja, whose capture was entrusted to a force consisting of the Tanzanian 208th Brigade and members of the UNLF.

The Tanzanian-UNLF force moved east out from Kampala on 15 April. Early in the morning on 22 April, the Tanzanians bombarded Jinja with artillery, and under the cover of darkness advanced towards the two bridges that crossed the Nile river west of the city. The column eliminated the resistance along the river and seized the Owen Falls Dam, which provided hydroelectric power to the entirety of Uganda. It entered Jinja largely unopposed and was met by cheering crowds, though sweeps through the city led to the capture of a few straggling Ugandan soldiers.

== Background ==
In 1971 Idi Amin launched a military coup that overthrew the President of Uganda, Milton Obote, precipitating a deterioration of relations with the neighbouring state of Tanzania. Amin installed himself as President and ruled the country under a repressive dictatorship. In October 1978 Amin launched an invasion of Tanzania. Tanzania halted the assault, mobilised anti-Amin opposition groups, and launched a counter-offensive. In a matter of months, the Tanzania People's Defence Force (TPDF) and its Ugandan rebel allies—unified under the umbrella organisation Uganda National Liberation Front (UNLF)—defeated the Uganda Army in a number of battles, and occupied Kampala, Uganda's capital, on 11 April 1979. With his military disintegrating or already in open revolt, Amin's rule was collapsing. Amin and many of his forces fled to the eastern city of Jinja, which was home to approximately 50,000 people.

Immediately after the fall of Kampala was announced, Ugandan troops already in Jinja began requisitioning vehicles and evacuating to Kenya. Amin addressed a crowd in the city, appealing to them to resist the Tanzanians and also vowing to make his "last stand" there and die in battle. According to journalist Nelson Bwire Kapo, Amin even declared Jinja the new capital of Uganda. He shortly thereafter fled to Arua, where he was picked up by a Libyan military plane and flown to Tripoli into exile. Nevertheless, some of his troops still garrisoned Jinja, which was the headquarters of the Eagle Colonel Gaddafi Battalion, and had control over the Owen Falls Dam at the source of the Nile River at Lake Victoria. The dam generated hydroelectric power which supplied electricity to all of Uganda and portions of Kenya. Observers were concerned that Amin's soldiers would sabotage or destroy the complex, and European newspapers spread rumors that Uganda Army troops were murdering civilians along the road to Jinja. The TPDF was under public pressure to immediately advance upon the city but took its time to reorganise and resupply in Kampala.

Meanwhile, the soldiers of the Eagle Colonel Gaddafi Battalion changed into civilian clothes and withdrew into the bush with their weapons, from where they began harassing locals. The battalion's commanding officer, Hussein Mohammed, reportedly suggested to his men that they should surrender, prompting a riot by the soldiers who belonged to the West Nile tribes. As long-time partisans of Amin, many soldiers of West Nile origin feared that they would be murdered in case of surrender. A police officer later claimed that he had heard the Gaddafi Battalion soldiers shooting at each other over the dispute. With his men no longer following orders, Hussein fled to Kenya, accompanied by "many" other soldiers of battalion. After Hussein's flight, a refugee reported that "no one" was left in control of the town. The Uganda Army troops that remained in Jinja—many of whom were drunk—enforced a nightly curfew, looted some of the local shops and the hospital, and murdered civilians. Most of the Ugandan garrison gradually melted away before the arrival of the Tanzanian-led force at Jinja, confiscating vehicles to escape to the east. Historians Tom Cooper and Adrien Fontanellaz argued that "a few hundred soldiers could have easily defended" the town, but the Ugandan defences were completely disorganised.

== Prelude ==
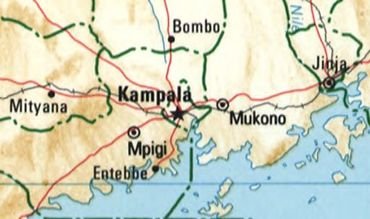
Map of Kampala and surrounding locales, including Jinja

The Tanzanians eventually assigned the 208th Brigade under Brigadier Mwita Marwa, their unit with the most combat experience, to capture Jinja. A total of 4,000 Tanzanian and 1,000 UNLF troops were to partake in the operation. They were to be accompanied by three Tanzanian tanks, one T-54 and two T-34s. Initially, rumours spread about the UA troops mining the road from Kampala to Jinja as well as the dam, disquieting the TPDF leadership about the operation. However, the UNLF Minister of Energy, Paul Oryema Opobo, was in regular contact with those still working at the dam. He informed the TPDF that the Amin loyalists had not placed any mines, meaning that an operation to capture Jinja could go ahead. The TPDF also decided not to attempt to encircle Jinja, as this could force the local pro-Amin holdouts to engage in a last stand; by keeping possible routes of retreat open, the garrison would probably flee, allowing the Tanzanians to capture the local infrastructure intact.

The combined force was able to requisition numerous vehicles in Kampala when it departed the city on 15 April, but had to share them among different groups of soldiers as it moved down the two-lane road toward Jinja. Intelligence reports indicated that there were few Uganda Army men along the route, easing worries about an ambush. Two days after the TPDF-UNLF advance began, British diplomat Richard Posnett told the Kampala press that the new Ugandan Minister of Power and Communications, Akena p'Ojok, had informed him that a team of commandos had secured Owen Falls Dam and was awaiting the arrival of the main force. The report was erroneous, but was quickly spread through the international media, and was even carried in a Tanzanian state-run newspaper, Daily News. According to p'Ojok, the report was a ploy by the Save Uganda Movement (SUM) to cause confusion among the local garrison and try to mislead them into abandoning their positions. The British Broadcasting Corporation broadcast the story over radio, and many residents in the Jinja area, fearful of the Uganda Army soldiers stationed around the city, began heading for the dam in hope of safety. They encountered drunken, violent soldiers manning a roadblock at the dam who killed many of them. Towards the end of the week the TPDF-UNLF force came close to the installation and encountered dozens of battered civilians who had managed to pass by the Uganda Army soldiers. Akena p'Ojok claimed that the story, alongside some guerrilla actions by local SUM members, did also cause more Amin loyalists to leave their positions and flee from Jinja.

The TPDF-UNLF advance was relaxed and uneventful; no resistance was encountered during the march, and many soldiers ate sugar cane and listened to music from looted radios. The column met celebratory crowds in the towns it passed through along the Jinja road, and towards the end of the week hundreds of civilians were tailing the force, socialising with the soldiers, carrying their supplies and weapons, and fetching them water. The civilians that came from Jinja were questioned by Tanzanian intelligence officers about the status of Uganda Army forces in the Jinja area. They offered highly varied accounts of the situation; estimates of the garrison's strength ranged between 200 and 2,000 men, and there were rumors that Amin was still in the city. The Tanzanians were aware of the roadblock at the Owen Falls Dam, but were unsure if there were other troops along the Nile, or if most of Amin's forces had fled further east.

There were only two passages across the Nile; a road bridge at the dam, and a railway bridge one kilometre upstream. Tanzanian planners assigned a main force of approximately 3,000 troops to secure Jinja and divided it into different groups to accomplish different tasks. One battalion was to secure the western side of the bridge, while another was then to quickly move across it and capture the eastern side. A third battalion, under Lieutenant Colonel Salim Hassan Boma, was to then proceed across and attack the Eagle Colonel Gaddafi Barracks. Two other battalions were tasked with seizing the rail bridge and waiting on the west bank, ready to flank Uganda Army forces should stiff opposition be put up near the dam. Tanzanian planners were worried that a few hundred soldiers could block their advance at the bridge, but were also afraid that heavy use of artillery would damage the dam and the bridges and create serious problems for the new Ugandan Government.

== Battle ==
The Tanzanians initiated an artillery bombardment of Jinja at 03:00 on 22 April. In less than 15 minutes the TPDF-UNLF soldiers packed their gear and began their advance toward the river. Vehicles moved at the rear of the column without their headlights, as Tanzanian commanders hoped to surprise the Uganda Army troops under the cover of darkness. However, as the force progressed east, civilians from nearby villages came out to beat drums in celebration and cheer it on, and Tanzanian officers were unable to quiet them.

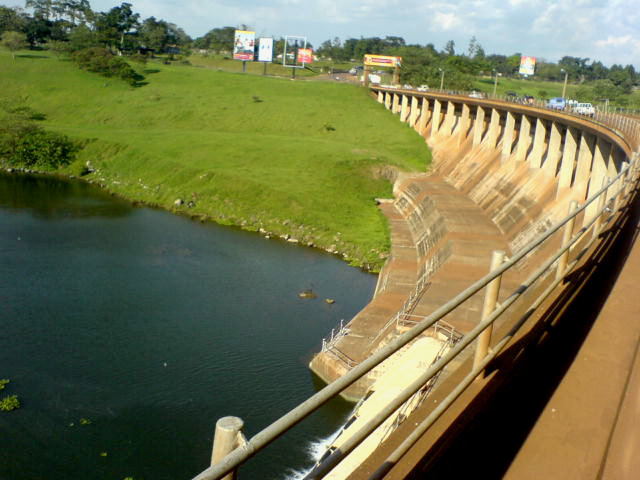
The Owen Falls Dam (pictured) was captured by Tanzanian forces after a short fight.

The two battalions at the railway bridge found the passage undefended and secured it without incident. Approximately 200 metres from the crossing at the dam, the TPDF-UNLF force was targeted with machine gun fire. This was later described as the Uganda Army garrison's "half-hearted attempt at an ambush". Unsure of the exact origin of the fire, the lead battalion was forced to hold its position for 15 minutes while tanks were brought up from the rear to reinforce them. Once in position, they began spraying the surrounding fields with their own machine guns. They also fired their 100 mm guns high over the dam, and 70 mm recoilless rifles and rocket-propelled grenades were employed in a similar manner in an attempt to frighten the Uganda Army soldiers. One emerged with his hands raised above his head and was quickly captured and pulled into a ditch in which Tanzanian soldiers were taking cover. Questioned at gunpoint, he stated that the west side of the bridge was only defended by 19 soldiers and a tank under the command of a major. The Tanzanian tanks directed their main fire at the reported location of the Ugandan tank, while their machine guns and those of Tanzanian armoured personnel carriers raked the air ten feet above the ground. Tanzanian rockets destroyed a 106 mm Ugandan howitzer. An 800-strong Tanzanian battalion ran under the covering fire and secured the eastern side of the bridge. According to Tanzanian Lieutenant Colonel Ben Msuya, several Ugandan soldiers put up stiff resistance at the Nile Breweries Limited building near the bridge before they were cleared out. Several minutes later at about 08:00, the tanks and several thousand troops moved across the bridge and advanced towards Jinja. Around this time, the majority of the remaining Gaddafi Battalion soldiers fled the town.

The western side of Jinja was quickly secured, but the TPDF-UNLF force took a cautious approach towards its advance into the downtown and the Eagle Colonel Gaddafi Barracks. Tanks bombarded the latter before Tanzanian infantry moved in to capture it. They found it deserted, and seized a dozen abandoned armoured vehicles, several buses and trucks, and large stocks of weapons. Many of the military vehicles at the barracks had never been used in combat, and were subsequently pressed into service by the Tanzanians. The TPDF-UNLF force met no opposition in the downtown, and were instead greeted by crowds of cheering civilians, which offered the soldiers sugar cane, oranges, and goats as gifts. Residents from villages on the western side of the Nile soon came into town to loot, but Tanzanian soldiers guarded the shops on the main street—the first time during the war they had made serious attempts to prevent pillaging. The civilians then took to stripping the unprotected shops and factories in outlying areas. According to war correspondent Al J Venter, the TPDF troops eventually began to loot the city themselves.

Journalists who arrived in Jinja shortly before 09:00 found a dead Uganda Army sergeant and the bodies of two civilians. Throughout the remainder of the morning and into the late afternoon Tanzanian soldiers conducted sweeps of the residential areas. Lieutenant Colonel Boma reportedly brandished a spear, charging ahead of his men into buildings which were suspected to harbour Ugandan stragglers. The Tanzanians captured around half a dozen Uganda Army soldiers in civilian clothes, who were identified by civilians or by the military identification cards and pay stubs they carried. Some Tanzanian commanders felt that it was no longer necessary to take prisoners; the new Ugandan Government had successfully appealed the previous week to thousands of Uganda Army personnel to lay down their arms, so those who had not already surrendered did not deserve to be taken alive. At the behest of the crowds, several of the prisoners were shot. Tanzanian officers later told the press that most of the Uganda Army soldiers fled the town at the start of the bombardment in the morning. The only reported Tanzanian casualty of the battle was a young soldier who had accidentally shot himself in the foot.

== Aftermath ==
An hour after Jinja was occupied, Marwa began walking around the city, gloating, "Idi Amin was the conqueror of the British Empire and I am the conqueror of Idi Amin! I am the conqueror of the conqueror of the British Empire!" Meanwhile, more journalists—some equipped with video cameras—arrived from the west. Marwa boasted to them that his forces had killed and captured many Uganda Army soldiers and that he would proceed to Arua, saying, "Amin is in Arua and we're going there to get him." Reporter Carey Winfrey wrote that "With the fall of Jinja, where the Nile River begins its 3,000-mile journey north to the sea, the five-and-a-half-month war is all but over: By choosing not to stand at Jinja, Field Marshal Amin forfeited his best chance to oppose the Tanzanian forces." Cooper and Fontanellaz stated that Jinja's capture meant that "the war in Uganda was effectively over". On the day following Jinja's capture, Mohammed Sebbi, a Uganda Army commander who had ordered the execution of numerous residents in the town, tried to flee the area while disguised as a civilian. He was caught and beaten to death by townspeople.

On 25 April, the TPDF's 208th Brigade—bolstered by the vehicles seized from the Eagle Colonel Gaddafi Barracks—advanced out of Jinja for the Kenyan border. Boma's battalion was left behind to maintain law and order in the city. At a road junction near Mbale, the brigade split into three battalions; one went to Mbale, one went to Moroto, and one went to Tororo. Arua was captured by the TPDF on 30 May. Combat operations in Uganda continued until 3 June, when Tanzanian forces reached the Sudanese border and eliminated the last resistance. Following the end of hostilities, Tanzanian officers reportedly used Jinja as hub to transport their loot from Uganda to Mwanza, including cars, tons of coffee, large amounts of gasoline, and war materiel. The vehicles and military equipment captured at Jinja were never returned, and instead integrated into the TPDF. The Tanzanian military withdrew from the country in 1981.
