= Isaac Lumago =

Ugandan military officer

Uganda Army Chief of Staff
- In office January 1977 – 8 May 1978
- President: Idi Amin
- Preceded by: Mustafa Adrisi
- Succeeded by: Yusuf Gowon

Minister of State for Defence of Uganda
- In office January 1977 – April 1978
- President: Idi Amin

Uganda High Commissioner to Lesotho
- In office 1975–1976
- President: Idi Amin
- Succeeded by: A. Oseku

Personal details
- Born: 1939 Koboko, Uganda Protectorate
- Died: 8 May 2012 (aged 72–73) Arua, Uganda
- Relations: Idi Amin (cousin)

Military service
- Allegiance: Uganda
- Branch/service: Uganda Army (UA); Former Uganda National Army (FUNA); West Nile Bank Front
- Years of service: 1963–?
- Rank: Major general
- Battles/wars: Ugandan Bush War; Battle of Kampala; War in Uganda (1986–1994)

Isaac Lumago (1939 – 8 May 2012) was a Ugandan military officer who served as chief of staff for the Uganda Army from 1977 to 1978, and later became leader of the Former Uganda National Army (FUNA).

== Biography ==
Isaac Lumago was born at Koboko in 1939. He was an ethnic Nubian, and a cousin of Idi Amin.

Lumago worked as a customs official before being recruited into the Uganda Army in 1963 by British officers. After undergoing training at the Sudanese Military Academy in Omdurman, he was made a second lieutenant and posted to Moroto. He underwent additional training over the following years and received steady promotions. By 1971 he held the rank of captain, and was supportive of Colonel Idi Amin's military coup that year. In 1974 he underwent training in the Soviet Union. Under Amin's rule, Lumago became Minister of Industry and Power before—at the rank of colonel—being appointed Uganda's High Commissioner to Lesotho in 1975. Operating from Maseru, he also was given responsibility for Uganda's relations with 12 other states in southern Africa. In July 1976 he was in Kenya when he overheard Kenya Air Force officers on 4 July, discussing plans by Israel to carry out a raid against Entebbe International Airport to free hostages who were held there by Palestinian and German airplane hijackers with the complicity of the Ugandan government. Lumago and Colonel Gad Wilson Toko, who was in Nairobi for non-military reasons, managed to telephone Brigadier Isaac Maliyamungu after failing to reach Uganda Army Chief of Staff Mustafa Adrisi. Maliyamungu, who was reportedly drunk at a night club, dismissed the warning and told both men that since they were acting in civilian capacity they should not concern themselves with military matters. The Israelis subsequently launched Operation Entebbe, rescuing the hostages and destroying a significant portion of the Uganda Army Air Force. Lumago was recalled from his diplomatic post back to Uganda later that year. (Note: According to To the Point International, Luamgo's recall was viewed by international observers "as a move to reduce the influence of the then Minister of Defence, Major General Mustafa Adrisi".)

In January 1977 Lumago, at the rank of general, was appointed Chief of Staff of the army and Minister of State for Defence. Lumago did little to exercise responsibility over his ministerial portfolio. At the time, he was regarded as a follower of Adrisi who had been appointed Vice President. In early 1978, a political rivalry between Adrisi and President Idi Amin gradually escalated until the former was injured in a suspicious car accident. The Vice President was consequently flown to Egypt for treatment, whereupon Amin purged his followers from the government. In April 1978, Lumago was among those officers who were deeply criticised by Amin in a public radio broadcast. Afterwards, on 8 May he was dismissed as Chief of Staff and Minister of State for Defence and relegated to inspecting the equipment of the army's mechanised regiments.

In 1979 Tanzanian forces and Ugandan rebels invaded Uganda and overthrew Amin. Lumago fled from his mansion in Koboko, which was subsequently destroyed. He went to Zaire, from where he organised remnants of the Uganda Army into a rebel force. Together with other pro-Amin groups, Lumago's force invaded the West Nile region in 1980, starting the Ugandan Bush War. He eventually rose to commander of the pro-Amin insurgent group known as Former Uganda National Army (FUNA). In July 1985, the Ugandan government under Tito Okello invited him and about 1,500 FUNA fighters to return. He accepted, joined Okello's government, and consequently began to fight against another rebel movement, the National Resistance Army (NRA) of Yoweri Museveni. Lumago set up his headquarters in a hotel in Kampala from where he gave interviews and directed his troops. Meanwhile, FUNA was accused of gross indiscipline, reportedly raping and murdering civilians in the capital and other areas, though Lumago denied these charges. He also lobbied for an amnesty to allow Idi Amin to return to Uganda. Lumago's troops fought with the UNLA to defend Kampala from a NRA offensive in January 1986, but were defeated. He was forced to flee back into Zaire. Lumago still served as one of the commanders of FUNA by 1990, serving alongside Dusman Sabuni and Abdulatif Tiyua. He later became an associate of the West Nile Bank Front. Despite appeals by Ugandan government officials to peacefully return to Uganda, Lumago initially refrained from laying down his weapons out of fears of reprisals due to his long opposition against Museveni. He continued to live in exile until 1997.

In late 2011 Lumago was made adviser to President Museveni for security in the West Nile sub-region. In 2012 Lumago fell ill and was taken to a medical clinic in Koboko. The clinic referred him to Arua Referral Hospital in Arua, where he was admitted to the intensive care unit. His health continued to deteriorate until he died on 8 May at the age of 73. Doctors suggested that he had died from high blood pressure.

== Personal life ==
Lumago was Christian by faith. By the time of his death, he had three wives and about thirty children. Lumago was a close friend of Andrew Mukooza, the last commander of the Uganda Army Air Force.
