= Uganda Army (1971–1980) =

Ugandan national armed forces under Idi Amin

- Active: 1971–1979; 1979–1980 (as rebel group)
- Country: Uganda (Second Republic)
- Type: Armed forces
- Size: 20,000 (estimated average strength, 1971–1979); 7,100 (estimated strength, 1980)
- Garrison/HQ: Republic House, Kampala
- Nickname: UA
- Engagements: 1972 invasion of Uganda; Aouzou Strip occupation (unofficially); Arube uprising Entebbe raid 1977 invasion of Uganda; Uganda–Tanzania War; Ugandan Bush War

Commanders
- Commander-in-Chief: Idi Amin
- Notable commanders: Mustafa Adrisi; Isaac Lumago; Isaac Maliyamungu; Yusuf Gowon; Ali Fadhul

The Uganda Army (abbreviated UA), also known as Uganda Armed Forces, served as the national armed forces of Uganda during the dictatorship of Idi Amin (1971–1979). It mostly collapsed during the Uganda–Tanzania War, but remnants continued to operate in exile from 1979. These pro-Amin rebel forces continued to be called the "Uganda Army" and maintained a semblance of cohesion until 1980, when they fully fractured into rival factions.

Following Uganda's independence in 1962, colonial units were transformed into the country's first national military which became known as the "Uganda Army". The military suffered from increasing ethnic and political tensions until UA commander Idi Amin overthrew President Milton Obote in 1971. The military was subsequently purged of perceived pro-Obote elements, resulting in a transformation of its setup and organization. Under Amin's rule, the UA became dominated by people of northwestern Ugandan, Sudanese, and Zairean origin, resulting in it being increasingly perceived as foreign mercenary force by most Ugandans. It was massively expanded and modernized, mostly with weaponry of Eastern Bloc origin, though Uganda's difficult international relations resulted in shortcomings in the supply of spare parts.

To maintain power, Amin used a complex patronage system through which he rewarded the Uganda Army's troops and maintained the soldiers' loyalty. As time went on, this system resulted in extreme corruption, growing indiscipline, and internal rivalries. Despite its numerical growth and good equipment, the fighting capabilities of the Uganda Army consequently deteriorated. Regardless, it remained a powerful force, and defeated several uprisings, coup attempts, and rebel invasions. In late 1978, parts of the Uganda Army invaded the neighboring Tanzania under unclear circumstances, resulting in the Uganda–Tanzania War. The military proved to be ineffective and badly motivated during this conflict, and most soldiers defected, deserted or mutinied after March 1979. Loyalist elements of the Uganda Army managed to retreat into Sudan and Zaire, however, from where they prepared to retake Uganda. The Uganda Army's remnants launched two successful invasions in 1980, capturing most of the West Nile region. Thereafter conflicts between its commanders and different factions resulted in a complete fragmentation of the remaining Uganda Army troops. One of these successor groups, the so-called Former Uganda National Army, maintained to be the continuation of the Uganda Army.

== History ==
=== Establishment of Uganda's armed forces ===
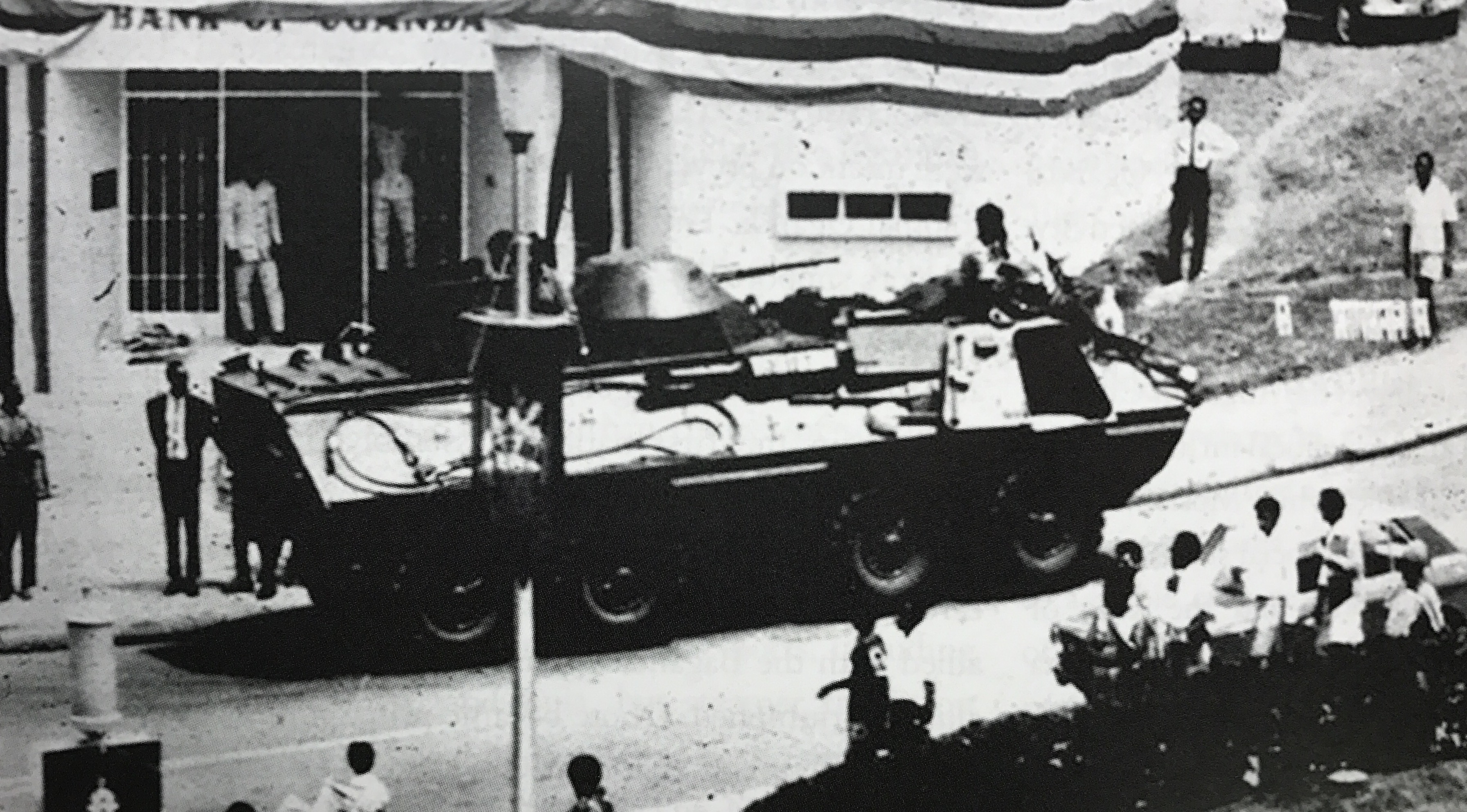
A Uganda Army OT-64 SKOT armoured personnel carrier during a military parade in Kampala in the late 1960s

After Uganda gained independence from the United Kingdom in 1962, 4th Battalion, King's African Rifles, at Jinja, was transformed into the country's first military force, the Uganda Rifles. The Uganda Rifles later became the Uganda Army. In the following years, the military was gradually expanded from 700 personnel in 1962 to 4,500 in 1965. Parliament passed the Armed Forces Act in 1964 to organise and regulate the army in place of older British ordinances. The measure provided for additional military expansion, including the establishment of the Uganda Army Air Force.

Besides defending the country from external foes such as during the Congo Crisis and battling regional insurgencies like the Rwenzururu movement, the Uganda Army was politicized. It became dominated by people from northern Uganda such as the Acholi, Langi, and West Nile tribal people. Over the course of the Mengo Crisis of 1966, Prime Minister Milton Obote and his protégé, Uganda Army commander Idi Amin, used the military to oust the country's president, Mutesa II of Buganda, and establish a de facto dictatorship. This event marked the full entry of the military into the political arena, and the start of ethnic purges in the Uganda Army, as many Bantu and Teso troops were ousted from the ranks. Obote subsequently assumed the presidency and Amin was appointed head of the Uganda Army, but rifts soon emerged between the two allies. Obote feared that the Uganda Army had become too dominated by West Nile tribesmen who were regarded as partisans of Idi Amin, and reacted by ordering the recruitment of more Langi and Acholi. By 1968, the Uganda Army had been expanded to about 9,800 personnel. By 1971 it was rumoured that Obote would have Amin arrested. The rivalry culminated in Amin's successful coup d'état of 25 January 1971, when Obote was on a trip abroad. The takeover was achieved with the support of a small coterie of low ranking army officers—most of whom were of Nubian or West Nile origin—who felt their positions would have been threatened by Amin's arrest.

=== The Uganda Army of Idi Amin ===
==== Establishment of military rule and first purges ====
Idi Amin's seizure of power meant that the Uganda Army had assumed full state power, ending the previous era during which civilian elites ruled in cooperation with military figures. The new administration and its more down-to-earth ruling style was initially welcomed by much of the population. Amin declared the "Second Republic of Uganda" to showcase his commitment to republicanism. He also released a manifesto justifying the coup; among other points it attacked Obote's "lack of support for the Army" and favoritism of other state security institutions. The week following the coup, Amin issued a decree declaring the creation of a Defence Council "consisting of the Commander-in-Chief, who shall be the chairman, the Army Chief of Staff, the Chief of the Air Staff, and such persons as the Commander-in-Chief may, by writing under his hand, appoint". The Defence Council was supposed to assist Amin and civilian officials in instituting a democratic transition, but this never occurred and soon the council came to supplant the cabinet as the key decision-making institution in the country.

The new regime immediately embarked on a program of military expansion. An Israeli firm was contracted to build two new army bases and several airfields. New mechanised battalions were established, as well as a paratrooper unit. Portions of the Uganda Army Air Force were redeployed from its main installation in Entebbe to the new airfields. (Note: As of 2020, many of the military installations constructed in Uganda under Amin's rule are intact.) Foreign equipment was ordered and procured with the assistance of France, Egypt and various Arab states, though the acquisitions depleted Uganda's foreign exchange reserves.

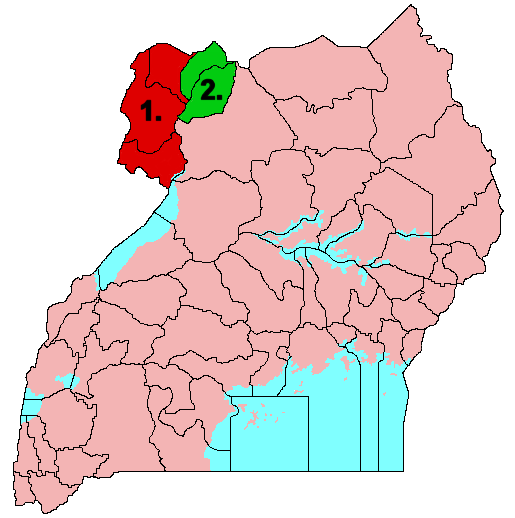
After Idi Amin assumed power, he filled the Uganda Army's ranks with soldiers from the West Nile District (dark red)

The coup created unrest in the Uganda Army, as tensions rose between the pre-existing Acholi and Langi-dominated hierarchy and the new command structure consisting of the junior officers who had supported Amin's takeover. Amin actually promised reforms in the army to make it more ethnically representative and improve its discipline. Despite this, hundreds of soldiers were massacred in the coup's immediate aftermath—including chief of staff Suleiman Hussein. The early killings—as well as arrests—were largely selective and meant to remove potential dissidents. Nevertheless, the repression disproportionately affected Acholi and Langi officers and thus provoked the flight of hundreds of Acholi and Langi soldiers from the country, who went into exile to link up with Obote. In April 1971, the full extent of the exodus was revealed when Sudanese authorities interned hundreds of army deserters and returned them to Uganda, where they were then massacred. Realizing that it could not effectively prevent the flight of army personnel from the country and fearing that more Acholi and Langi would join with Obote, Amin's regime resorted to indiscriminate violence and moved to systematically purge the Uganda Army of Acholi, Langi, and Teso soldiers. Teso soldiers were targeted by Amin's supporters despite the fact that many of them did not resist the coup. Researcher Thomas Lowman interviewed several Ugandans who had witnessed the killings of Teso personnel, and all of them said the massacres of these soldiers were a result of "confusion rather than strategy." Lowman concluded that the Teso soldiers were "erroneously targeted".

About 5,000 Acholi and Langi soldiers were killed or forcibly disappeared in the next months. Journalist Patrick Keatley estimated that as much as two thirds of the original military personnel were killed within a year. The most severe purges took place in July 1971, when fighting broke out at the military barracks of Mbarara, Jinja and Moroto. The Ugandan government maintained that pro-Obote guerrillas had attacked the barracks, whereas a pro-opposition source stated that the fighting had erupted due to tribal rivalries and 900 Acholi as well as Lango troops being massacred by Amin's supporters. A large number of the Acholi and Langi exiles joined Obote's "People Army" and "Kikosi Maalum" force which aimed at overthrowing Amin. These insurgents found a haven in Tanzania which opposed Amin's seizure of power, causing tensions that resulted in border clashes in August 1971. In August 1971, FRONASA rebels attempted to set up a guerrilla base on Mount Elgon, but they were quickly discovered and mostly arrested by Ugandan security forces.

In order to replace the purged troops and consolidate his power, Amin enlisted tribesmen belonging to ethnic groups that lived in the West Nile District, Sudan, Zaire (present-day DR Congo), Kenya, and Rwanda. These tribes such as the Kakwa, Nubians, Madi, Lugbara, and Alur were believed to be more loyal to Amin, and their fortunes were tied to the survival of his regime. In addition, former Congolese Simba and ex-Anyanya rebels from southern Sudan rebels became an important force among the restructured Uganda Army. Most promotions were granted to Muslim soldiers. In the course of 1971, Amin recruited 19,742 new soldiers, nominally increasing the Uganda Army to 27,000. This massive intake of untrained troops, along with the political purges and the expanded patronage system caused widespread indiscipline. By the end of the year, just 11,409 soldiers were actually accounted for. Tom Cooper and Adrien Fontanellaz described the military as being in a state of "near-anarchy" from this point onwards. The government could not financially sustain this expansion, and subsequently reduced the number of personnel. In early 1972, Amin ordered another purge of Uganda Army troops that were suspected of being disloyal, killing "thousands" of Luo soldiers. About 600 soldiers who had been imprisoned since the coup were also executed. At the same time, Amin strengthened the military's rule by stationing troops in every village of the country, ostensibly to aid rural development. In fact, it mostly helped to keep the population under control. He also expelled Uganda's Asian minority in early August 1972, and redistributed their wealth to his supporters, including the military. Amin also wielded the army as the country's main arm of law enforcement, which facilitated soldiers' abuse of power over civilians and subverted the authority of the police and non-military institutions. Given wide latitude to act, soldiers could shoot civilians with the justification that they were "resisting investigation". They also began conducting public executions.

==== 1972 invasion, growing factional violence, and Operation Entebbe ====
When Obote's loyalists launched invasions in 1972 from Tanzania and southern Sudan, they were completely defeated by Amin's troops and allied Libyan soldiers. This failed invasion marked the beginning of "a new and unprecedently violent phase" of Amin's reign. His regime greatly empowered and further expanded the military, allowed soldiers to act with impunity, and ultimately caused a "destructive spiral of violence" that destabilized the country. As a result of the increasing brutality and the growing number of troops of West Nile origin whose primary language was Swahili, Ugandan civilians increasingly began to perceive the military as a "foreign" force. At the same time, Amin's following gradually became narrower as he grew paranoid and his resources to buy the troops' loyalty shrank amid Uganda's economic decline. The Alur were the first West Nile group that fell from power. As they were quite numerous and related to the Acholi and Langi, Amin's regime began to regard them as a security risk and purged them. The highest-ranking Alur officer, Lieutenant Colonel Valentine Ochima, was removed from the Defence Council and imprisoned in July 1971. Following Obote's invasion, Ochima was shot and all other Alur officers removed from important posts. Next, the Madi were disempowered mostly because they opposed the growing influence of Muslims in the regime. Madi soldiers were also accused of being undisciplined and aiding anti-Amin insurgents. The Lugbara also fell under suspicion as they were the largest West Nile tribe. To replace the purged troops, Amin began to enlist a growing number of Sudanese. When the First Sudanese Civil War ended in March 1972, many Anyanya rebels opted to cross the border and enlist in the Uganda Army instead of remaining in their home country or integrating into the Sudanese military, as per the agreement that ended the civil war. (Note: The Sudanese government supported these recruitments, as it removed the Anyanya from their own territory.) Some Lugbara, Madi, and Alur officers wanted to stop the growing chaos in Uganda by overthrowing Amin, but their conspiracy was crushed in July 1973. The year also witnessed another purge of the military. By the end of 1973, the Alur, Lugbara, and Madi were marginalized, and several high-ranking commanders belonging to these tribes had been ousted from the Uganda Army or killed. The army also proved incapable of containing incursions from Turkana cattle raiders from Kenya, though on several occasions they crossed the border in pursuit and carried out reprisals on Kenyans both there and in Uganda. In addition, Ugandan soldiers who had been sent for a training mission to Libya were ordered by Libyan leader Muammar Gaddafi to assist in the Libyan occupation of the Aouzou Strip in Chad in 1973.

[...] when some army officers are promoted they run for big cars and stop buying suits. Some of them are dressed like cowboys in bell-bottom trousers.

— President Idi Amin, 1974, about the indiscipline in the Uganda Army

At the same time, many native Ugandan officers felt marginalized by the growing number of foreigners in the military. Led by Brigadier Charles Arube (a Kakwa) and Lieutenant Colonel Elly Aseni, some of these officers plotted to overthrow Amin. In response to the murder of a Lugbara foreign minister, the remaining Lugbara in the army joined this plot. The coup attempt, later known as "Arube uprising", was launched in March 1974, as the Lugbara troops initiated an uprising at the Malire Barracks in Kampala and Arube led a strike force to arrest or kill Amin. The plot failed when the President shot Arube dead, throwing the coup plotters into chaos. The revolt was subsequently put down with force, and over 100 soldiers were killed. After the purge of the Lugbara commander of the Suicide Battalion, another uprising broke out, in November 1974. Lugbara troops mutinied at the Mbuya barracks, and revolting Suicide Battalion troops had to be defeated at Mbarara. At least 15 soldiers were killed, and several others deserted. Thereafter, the Lugbara were no longer powerful enough to act as "counterweight to the Amin regime". From 1975, the "Kakwa-Nubi-Anyanya core" was dominant in the military. Despite their loss of power, most Madi, Lugbara, and Alur remained at least nominally loyal, as they still benefited from Amin's regime. "Substantial" numbers of Madi, Lugbara, and Alur were also kept in the military.

In June 1976, Amin allowed pro-Palestinian militants to land a hijacked Airbus A300 jet airliner at Entebbe. Israel launched a counter-terrorist hostage-rescue mission, known as "Operation Entebbe" in the following month, freeing most of the airliner's passengers after killing dozens of Ugandan soldiers and all of the hijackers. The Israeli forces consequently destroyed most of the Ugandan aircraft present at Entebbe airport to prevent the Ugandans from pursuing them. The raid greatly damaged the Uganda Army, and though it was able to mostly replace the lost war materiel, internal rifts continued to worsen. Around August 1976, the Uganda Army experienced another purge, while rogue troops went on an ethnically charged rampage in Jinja and Makerere, killing or expelling all Kenyans they could find. Around this time, the Uganda Army also launched operations against armed smugglers operating on Lake Victoria. Researcher Aiden Southall argued that these operations were so intense that they amounted to "warfare". In the end, the military was unable to suppress the smuggling.

In January 1977, President Amin removed General Mustafa Adrisi from his post as army chief of staff and appointed him Vice President of Uganda. Amin had ruled Uganda without a vice president for six years, and his decision to give Adrisi the job probably stemmed from his wish to appease soldiers who wanted the dismissal of Brigadier Hussein Marella, an ally of Amin who had killed a prominent Lugbara officer.

==== Purge of Adrisi and increasing internal strife ====
In 1977, the Uganda Army was subjected to more ethnic purges. These were often met with resistance, and flagrant armed insubordination in the army increased. In one case, soldiers were hired by a businessman to rescue his brother, resulting in a successful attack on the prison at Iganga and the freeing of 600 prisoners. While one lieutenant colonel in the Bondo garrison personally oversaw the instructed execution of his Acholi officers, another opted to send his Acholi and Langi subordinates on leave so that they could flee. The largely Acholi and Langi Chui Battalion began denying access of their barracks to agents of the State Research Bureau, Amin's state security organisation, which was usually tasked with enforcing purges. Over time they began shooting at the agents when they entered their environs. The purges also sparked additional desertions, as more Acholi and Langi personnel fled the country to join Obote's rebel group. Members of the Malire Battalion and air force attempted to kill Amin during Operation Mafuta Mingi in June. In late 1977, a rebel group known as "Uganda Liberation Movement" attempted to invade from Kenya, but the insurgents were easily defeated by the Uganda Army. Following the bloodshed of 1977, Amin declared that 1978 would be a "year of peace". Nevertheless, infighting and factionalism in the army increased.

Beginning in 1977, the Uganda Army had been affected by growing tensions between supporters of Amin and soldiers loyal to Vice President Adrisi. Adrisi intended to purge foreigners in the military, particularly Sudanese, as he felt that foreigners were not dependent enough on the regime to support it, and would at their convenience flee back to their lands of origin. He thought that it would be best if the Uganda Army was made up of northern Ugandans who had a larger stake in fighting for it. By this point, Uganda was already in a state of acute crisis, as its economy and infrastructure collapsed, and the different factions in the Uganda Army increasingly competed for the remaining resources. Adrisi was outmaneuvered by his political opponents, and relieved of his ministerial portfolios after being injured in a car accident in early 1978. Amin consequently purged Adrisi's loyalists from the military, including chief of staff Isaac Lumago and other ranking officers such as Moses Ali, Juma Oris, and Nasur Ezega. Ultimately, almost 3,000 troops were removed by Amin. These purges reinforced suspicions that Adrisi's "car accident" had been an assassination attempt. The Lugbara troops were especially upset about Adrisi's fall from power.

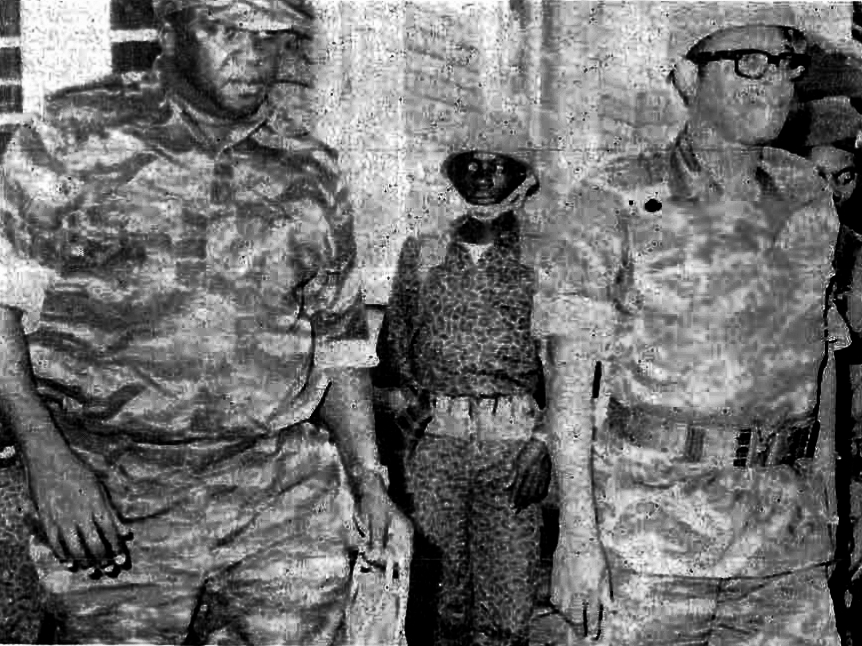
Idi Amin (left), dressed in military fatigues, visiting Zairean dictator Mobutu Sese Seko in 1977

Several "disturbances" took place at various army barracks in the next months, as soldiers mutinied or were purged. One major revolt took place in August, as a clique of officers attempted to forcibly restore a civilian government. In September 1978, Amin announced that he had recruited an additional 10,000 foreigners for the military, causing further discontent among the other troops of the Uganda Army. According to a Ugandan soldier interviewed by the Drum magazine, a significant number of these new recruits were actually Ugandans, many of them children, who had been forcibly conscripted. Researcher Aiden Southall argued that by this point Ugandan soldiers had been increasingly substituted by "Sudanese and Zairois guerrillas and mercenaries", while Paul Nugent said that this development "amounted to the disappearance of a national army in the conventional sense of the term." On 27 October, members of the military's southern and western commands allegedly met at Kabamba and drafted a 12‐point petition to Amin, demanding the end of corruption, factionalism, and favoritism of Nubian troops; the curtailing of the State Research Bureau's powers; the reinstatement of Adrisi and Lumago; the enforcement of religious tolerance; and an end of the alliance with various Arab powers.

==== Uganda–Tanzania War ====
Map of the Uganda–Tanzania War

In late October 1978, the Uganda Army crossed the border to Tanzania and invaded the Kagera salient. The circumstances of this invasion remains unclear. Several experts and politicians have argued that Amin directly ordered the invasion to distract the Ugandan military and public from the crisis at home. Researcher Amii Omara-Otunnu stated that "the technological superiority of his armaments had blinded [Amin] from seeing the ineptitude and indiscipline of his troops." On the other side, diplomats such as Paul Etiang and other purported eyewitnesses claimed that troops loyal to Adrisi had allegedly mutinied and almost killed Amin, but were eventually defeated by loyalist troops. The Uganda Army then chased after the mutineers who crossed the border to Tanzania, resulting in the invasion. The New York Times reporter John Darnton pieced together several accounts by refugees, and argued that the invasion was possibly part of an elaborate plan by Amin. The President had sent soldiers loyal to Adrisi to the border, and then ordered them to invade Tanzania. This was supposed to be a suicide mission, and the weakened survivors would be purged by other units upon returning to Uganda. When one officer learned of this plan, he and his men revolted. However, Darnton also cautioned that the refugees were not necessarily reliable sources of information. Researchers Andrew Mambo and Julian Schofield discounted the theory about the mutinies as unlikely, noting that the battalions that were said to have mutinied remained relatively loyal to Amin's cause throughout the war with Tanzania. Mambo, Schofield, and some Ugandan commanders instead argued that the invasion was the result of violent incidents along the border which had spiralled out of control or been exploited by glory-seeking soldiers. Accordingly, the invading Ugandan troops acted on their own causing Amin to sanction the invasion post facto to save face. In any case, the invasion resulted in open war with Tanzania.

Even though the Uganda Army overwhelmed the weak border defenses and successfully occupied Kagera, the invasion already exposed its catastrophic weaknesses. The Ugandan troops and their officers focused on looting the occupied territory instead of continuing their advance or preparing any defenses. They also raped local women and shot and killed about 1,500 civilians. According to a Ugandan soldier interviewed by the Drum magazine, thousands of Uganda Army soldiers took their loot and then deserted. When it became clear that the Tanzanians were preparing a counter-offensive, the Ugandan forces began to withdraw from Kagera. The Tanzania People's Defence Force (TPDF) counter-attacked in November 1978, encountering almost no resistance and retaking all lost territory.

Amin's problem isn't lack of hardware. His problem is that his army is no damn good.

— An unnamed Western diplomat on the Uganda Army's poor performance during the Uganda–Tanzania War

In January 1979, the Tanzanians and allied Ugandan rebels crossed the border, and defeated the Uganda Army in the Battle of Mutukula. The Tanzanians used BM-21 Grad rocket launchers along the border with particular effectiveness. The Ugandans lacked weaponry which was able to counter the Tanzanian artillery, and were terrified by the destructive capabilities of the BM-21 Grads. Amin dispatched a team of officers to Spain to investigate the purchase of aircraft and napalm bombs to counter the rockets, but ultimately no munitions were acquired. The Uganda military suffered further reversals during the next month: Its southern defenses were overrun during the Battles of Simba Hills and Gayaza Hills, though at the latter it executed a successful ambush on a Tanzanian battalion. These failures were followed by another defeat in the Battle of Masaka and the loss of Mbarara. By late February, southern Uganda was occupied by Tanzanian-led forces. In addition, the Uganda Army Air Force had suffered such heavy losses during these operations that it was effectively eliminated as a fighting force.

The ability of the Uganda Army's ground forces to resist the TPDF was hampered by organizational chaos, indiscipline, and the widespread lack of combat experience among its troops. Well equipped with armoured personnel carriers, the Ugandan soldiers usually chose to fight along the country's roads, but deployed their vehicles ineffectively against well-armed Tanzanian troops, resulting in many losses. Though the Uganda Army employed at least 20,000 personnel by 1978/79, only 3,000 Ugandan soldiers at most were deployed at the front lines at any given time. The 10,000 new recruits had little training, and were used to man roadblocks instead of serving at the front lines. Despite being regarded as Amin's "elite" troops, the foreign soldiers of the Uganda Army proved unreliable and often put up little resistance. One former Uganda Army officer later attributed his military's inability to organize a proper resistance to the soldiers being more interested in protecting their wealth and families rather than fight; the troops were not properly trained and many had become more akin to wealthy civilians than actual soldiers.

Despite support by the Palestine Liberation Organisation and Libya, the Uganda Army was defeated in the war's decisive Battle of Lukaya on 10–11 March 1979. Thereafter, the Ugandan military completely disintegrated. In late March 1979, Darnton estimated that Amin could only rely on about 2,500 Nubians in the Uganda Army; "the loyalty or at least will to fight" of the other troops was "questionable". In April 1979, the TPDF and its allies captured Kampala; Amin fled into exile. Some Uganda Army troops continued their resistance, but were defeated during Tanzanian mopping-up operations from April to June 1979. About 3,000 Uganda Army personnel were taken prisoner during the war. Most fleeing soldiers focused on plundering shops and banks as well as on stealing cars in hopes of escaping with as much loot as possible. The Uganda Army was replaced as Uganda's national armed forces by the Uganda National Liberation Army (UNLA), a former pro-Tanzanian alliance of rebel militias. The air force was left completely destroyed by the war, as was the army's lake patrol force. Meanwhile, Obote returned to power and became president following the disputed general election of 1980.

=== Ugandan Bush War and final fracturing ===
Thousands or even tens of thousands of Uganda Army troops managed to flee across the borders to Zaire and Sudan, however, where they reorganized as insurgents and rallied under the leadership of officers such as Emilio Mondo, Isaac Lumago, Isaac Maliyamungu, Elly Hassan, Christopher Mawadri, and Moses Ali. Most of the Anyanya veterans successfully escaped to Juba. Other veterans remained in Uganda, and the new Tanzanian-backed government soon announced that they should assemble in Kampala. Many went, expecting to be enlisted in the UNLA, but they were instead imprisoned without trial. The new government viewed them as criminals due to their association with Amin's regime. They remained incarcerated for years, though most were gradually pardoned by the successive Ugandan governments. The reasoning of the pardons often remained unclear, though authorities often requested testimonies by the soldiers' communities to determine "whether they would be a danger to the public when released." In other cases, the veterans were acquitted after their families or local leaders asked for their release.

In autumn 1980, about 7,100 Uganda Army troops successfully invaded northwestern Uganda, starting the Ugandan Bush War. Despite capturing most of the West Nile region from the UNLA, the Uganda Army remained highly factious. Its remaining forces were not truly unified but split into several bands with differing agendas. Some Uganda Army groups wanted to restore Amin to presidency, whereas others wanted to distance themselves from him. (Note: Several rebel factions repeatedly asked Amin to return to lead them during their insurgency in the bush, but he refused, preferring to live the rest of his life in luxury in Saudi Arabia. He died there in 2003.) Some troops without larger political goals simply did not wish to give up their arms return to civilian livelihoods. This rift culminated in open war between two rival factions which became known as the "Uganda National Rescue Front" (UNRF) under Moses Ali, and the "Former Uganda National Army" (FUNA), led by Elly Hassan. UNRF mostly defeated FUNA in July 1981, but both factions continued to be active in the West Nile region. FUNA maintained its claim to be the continuation of the Uganda Army during this time. In August 1985, FUNA leader Isaac Lumago even claimed that the "structure of the army that went into exile after Amin's overthrow remains intact in southern Sudan and eastern Zaire". In 1985, President Obote was overthrown by a clique of UNLA officers led by Tito Okello. Okello's regime consequently convinced several ex-Uganda Army rebel groups to join his forces.

The UNLA was defeated by National Resistance Army (NRA) rebels in 1986. As result, the National Resistance Movement (NRM) assumed power, Yoweri Museveni was installed as president, and the NRA became Uganda's new national military. When the NRA advanced into the West Nile region, the local elders convinced most ex-Uganda Army soldiers to peacefully surrender and reconcile with Museveni's government. Some ex-Uganda Army forces even managed to make favorable deals with the NRM. Moses Ali integrated his private army into the National Resistance Army and subsequently became a high-ranking military officer and official in Museveni's government. Some elements of FUNA and UNRF refused to lay down their weapons, but were consequently forced to retreat back into Zaire and Sudan. Though FUNA and UNRF dissolved afterwards, ex-Uganda Army soldiers formed the West Nile Bank Front and UNRF (II) which battled Museveni's government in the 1980s and 1990s. Some militant Amin loyalists and Uganda Army veterans such as Dusman Sabuni eventually joined the Allied Democratic Forces that continue to wage an insurgency up until the present day.

=== Legacy ===
I am called Amin's man but I did not join in Amin's time. We are called Amin's men but we did not join to help Amin. Now we are in peace, the poorest of soldiers. And where is Amin?

— Yusuf Gowon, former Uganda Army chief of staff, 2017

The Uganda Army became closely associated with Idi Amin among Uganda's population, and its veterans remain popularly known as "Amin's soldiers" (Kiswahili: Omusilikale wa Amin) or "Amin's men". In the decades since Amin's downfall, the term maintained a negative connotation in much of Uganda due to the Uganda Army's indiscipline, brutal conduct, and corruption. "Amin's soldiers" were stereotypically believed to be uneducated northerners who had only joined the military to maintain Amin's power, despite the existence of many veterans who did not correspond to this image. This negative perception affected their attempted reintegration into civilian communities; their military service was seen as a "shame", they were monitored by authorities, and many were not granted their full pensions. There were also differences between the veterans, as some of those who had peacefully surrendered after the Uganda–Tanzania War became outcasts, whereas those who had joined rebel groups were later "welcomed back to Uganda". Some veterans came to resent Amin, especially as he had continued to live in luxury in exile, leaving them to their fate.

Many issues also remained unresolved in regard to questions of guilt. Victims of Amin's regime believe that many soldiers who had committed human rights violations essentially walked free. This problem is exacerbated by the reconciliation policies of the NRM government that governs Uganda since 1986. Since the 1990s, many Uganda Army veterans have also begun to lobby for their cause, and publicly criticised their stereotypical perception as perpetrators, arguing that they should not be generally blamed for Amin's crimes. In the early 2000s veterans of the army from the 1960s and 1970s formed the Uganda Army Service Men Development Association and sued the government, demanding to be properly compensated for their service. In 2007 the Ugandan Court of Appeal ruled that since the Armed Forces of Act of 1964 had not been officially superseded by other legislation until 1992, "the Uganda Army technically remained the national army side by side with the NRA" up to that point and thus its 45,000 members required compensation for those years of duty. The government appealed the case to the Supreme Court, which nullified the award. Despite this, President Museveni declared that his government would reimburse the veterans alongside other former members of Ugandan armies to signify his government's appreciation for their national service. Over the subsequent years the government began making payouts at a gradual pace.

== Morale, motivations, and role in the patronage system ==
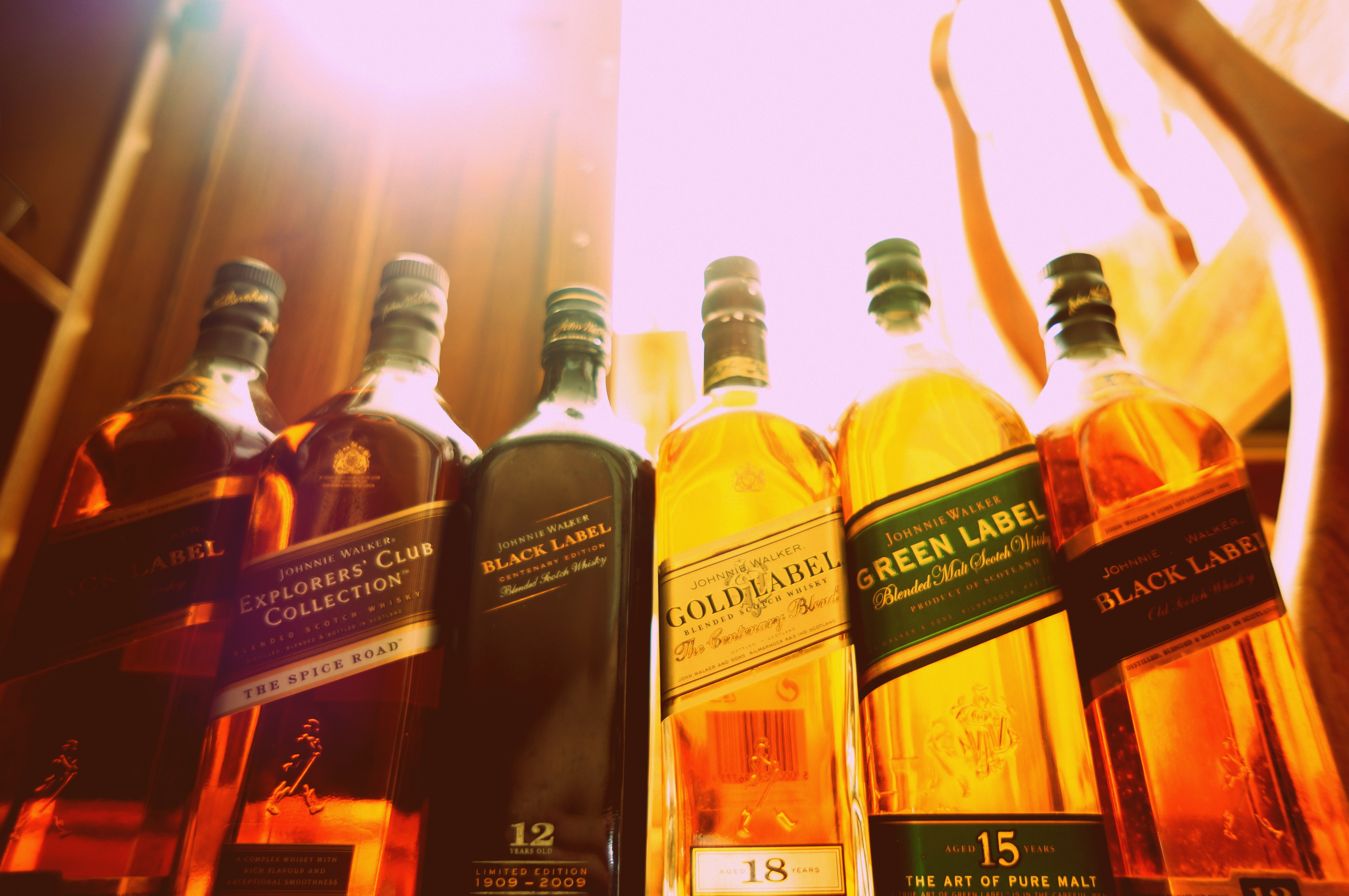
The Uganda Army's morale was connected to Idi Amin's ability to provide the troops with rewards such as scotch whisky (examples pictured).

The Uganda Army was Idi Amin's primary base of power. He consequently granted the soldiers rewards to keep them loyal and developed an "advanced clientage and patronage system". As part of this system, the Uganda Army was both the main channel in Uganda through which rewards were distributed, as well as the primary recipient.

In general, soldiers were granted great leeway in their relations with civilians, and allowed to demand service from many businesses without payment. This was not unprecedented, as the Ugandan troops had already been allowed to act in this way during the previous Obote administration. Nevertheless, the extent of the military's misbehavior greatly increased under Amin. The soldiers were also given access to luxury hotels, and provided with money, alcohol, cigars, petrol, and cars. In this regard, the so-called "whisky run", "Whisky-Airline", or "Ugandan Connection" was of great importance. This was an almost nightly air transport service by cargo planes that traveled from Entebbe Airport to London Stansted Airport and back. Guarded by State Research Bureau agents, the planes brought coffee for sale to England, and returned to Uganda with alcohol, cigars, cars, various luxury items, and supplies for the military and police. Other goods included linen and electronics, which were stored in the State House in Entebbe for safekeeping. Soldiers would either buy these goods for their own use or sell them on the black market for a profit. Along with similar air services to the United States, the "whisky run" acted as "Amin's lifeline" and won him a "shaky loyalty" among the military, and especially among the officers who received most of the rewards. The expulsion of Asians was also motivated by Amin's desire to redistribute their wealth and thereby ensure the Uganda Army's support. Soldiers were given the majority of the property expropriated from the expelled Asian community.

During Amin's time here was nothing. Because when he came here, what he did based here was recuit all the youth [...]. OK, from the army they got ranks and so on. That is what they benefited from. But there was no tangible development here, not here, but people were enjoying themselves all over, all over the big shops in the city, everywhere and so on.

— An unnamed elder from the West Nile region

Loyal soldiers were also promoted in such great numbers that it created chaos in the chain of command. As result of the great power wielded by soldiers, businesses were forced into clientage relationships with officers to avoid being constantly harassed or stolen from. Taken together with the President's own system of favors, the military developed a patronage system in which high-ranking military men combined "military, political, administrative, commercial, and agricultural operations into composite fiefs", becoming autonomous warlords. To keep these officers from becoming too powerful, Amin allowed and even encouraged lower-ranks to ignore their commanders' orders and take orders directly from himself. Troops were also allowed to bend rules and disregard many laws. As result, many soldiers also acted as bandits, were willing to loan or sell their weapons to civilians, and operated as guns for hire. Soldiers also frequently engaged in poaching in national parks and game reserves, dramatically decreasing wildlife populations in the country. As they were generally more wealthy and had better access to various goods, clinics, and schools, soldiers were among the most eligible men in the country for marriage. Many Uganda Army troops used their weapons and status to rape women without suffering consequences. In general, service in the Uganda Army provided great economic and social incentives, providing military men with wealth and power in an increasingly dysfunctional country. Military service was especially attractive to West Nile people due to their home area's poverty. Amin did little to actually help West Nile's development during his rule, and the Uganda Army remained one of the few actual employment opportunities for locals. Researcher Mark Leopold consequently described the West Nile soldiers during Amin's rule as "lumpen militariat", a term originally developed by Ali Mazrui based on the Marxist concept of Lumpenproletariat. In addition, the Ugandan urban poor and people from rural low-income families in Zaire as well as Sudan were targeted by recruiters with promises of patronage, power, and adventure. By 1977, the higher-ranking officers were effectively the country's economic elite, possessing cars, villas, clubs, and their own duty-free shop in Kampala, while the country's economy had fallen into chaos.

Even though this patronage system succeeded to keep much of the military somewhat loyal, it negatively affected the Uganda Army's ability to function. Corruption and indiscipline were widespread, and the soldiers were often unpredictable, especially when they were drunk. In addition, the morale of the troops was bound to Amin's ability to keep their needs satisfied. This was especially the case for the military's foreign troops who were operating as mercenaries and thus only loyal as long as they received their remuneration on time. Idi Amin's rule thus remained precarious and he faced repeated coup attempts by dissatisfied elements in the Uganda Army. With the Ugandan economy shrinking, Amin was also unable to provide all troops with ample rewards. He responded by reducing his following, promoting factionalism in the military and repeatedly purging senior ranks, thereby making concentrated actions against his regime unlikely. The factionalism in the military further reduced the Uganda Army's cohesion, and caused violent infighting. By 1978, many troops were discontent due to the lack of proper uniforms and delays in pay which resulted in soldiers regularly robbing shopkeepers during "foraging expeditions". When the Uganda–Tanzania War erupted the British authorities also stopped the "whisky run". According to German news magazine Der Spiegel, this demoralised the cut-off Ugandan troops and negatively affected their willingness to keep fighting.

== Organization ==
=== Command ===
Had ours been a civilized army, [the brigadier] would have simply ordered the colonel to drop the idea and that would have been that. However, ours was a different army. A brigadier was too powerless to check a colonel's powers.

— Ugandan soldier Bernard Rwehururu on the haphazard command structure of the army

The Uganda Army suffered from organizational chaos during Idi Amin's rule. Many soldiers did not stay at their respective unit's barracks, and senior officers were regularly moved from one position to another to prevent them from gaining firm influence over the troops. In addition, the military was affected by factional infighting and regular purges, and many officers whom Amin promoted were completely unqualified and corrupt. Their rise in the ranks was attributed to their loyalty to the President and their ethnicity. Amin initially had the support of a handful of educated, high-ranking officers in the army, while several more did not oppose him and were accepting of him as President. Over time this group came into repeated conflict with the group of less-educated soldiers whom Amin promoted. The formal chain of command ceased to function and the ranks of officers gradually became meaningless. People wielded influence in accordance to their connection to Amin, and a junior officer who was liked by the President could easily circumvent or even command a senior officer who was less well connected. The power of individuals was also tied to the ability to provide economic resources to supporters. In order to keep the officers in line, Amin would often call high-ranking commanders in the middle of the night and accuse them of treason "just to shake them up a bit". By the end of Amin's rule, the Uganda Army had a very fragmented command structure which contributed to its troops often operating in fairly small groups during the Uganda–Tanzania War.

The army's headquarters was located in Republic House in Kampala. The military was factually controlled by the Defence Council which mostly consisted of Amin's inner circle. As the President was illiterate, he issued orders to officers personally or via telephone.

=== Factionalism and ethnicity ===
The Uganda Army was highly factionalised under Idi Amin's rule, with different groups and people rising and then falling from power. In general, tribal identities were of great importance to determine a soldier's standing, though this was a complex issue. Amin's regime actually wanted to reduce the ethnic and religious lines of division in the country which would have helped to keep its rule stable. The President himself was known for his repeated criticism of tribalism, and pledged to combat it. A few of his appointments of officers did reflect this intention to defuse ethnic tensions. At the same time, Amin's government mostly "acted within ethnic categories" and ultimately fueled ethnic favoritism. Indian diplomat Madanjeet Singh wrote that Amin "had a cunning grasp of the tribal mentality, and shrewdly played upon intertribal and interreligious rivalries, quarrels and envy to control the army". This paradox resulted from the regime's most important concern, namely to ensure its survival. Certain ethnic groups were judged to be simply more loyal than others due to familial and economic circumstances. As result, they were empowered, but this increased factionalism and in turn led to more strife, necessitating even more reliance on trusted elements. Amin's government was never able to solve this problem, and many of its initiatives were driven by the anxiety of losing control. In addition, ethnic affiliation and tribalism were problematic issues in Uganda. This was due to Ugandan "tribes" being often ill-defined and changeable, as no firm tribal structures existed among many West Nile peoples, while intermarriage also occurred. Amin himself was of mixed ethnic origin. (Note: His father was a Kakwa and his mother a Lugbara. Regardless, some sources also describe him as being of mixed Kakwa-Nubian origin.) In fact, the much-favored Nubians were "an extremely fluid category" and Amin himself stated that members of different tribes could become Nubians. (Note: The Nubians are often portrayed as descendants of Emin Pasha's mostly Muslim soldiers who fled to Uganda after being defeated by Mahdist Sudanese forces in the 1880s. Regarded as martial people, they were consequently recruited into British colonial units; as a result, West Nile people who wanted to join the military often claimed to be Nubians. This led to the paradoxical situation that the Nubians were both "detribalised" yet had also a distinct identity intimately linked to the West Nile region, to Islam, and to military service.) According to Henry Kyemba, the Sudanese Anyanya fighters who joined Amin's forces preferred to identify themselves as Nubians. The monetary and status enhancement accompanying military service was especially attractive to Ugandan Nubians as they mostly belonged to poor urban families and were traditionally subjected to discrimination by other Ugandans.

Tribalism is the biggest enemy in Africa today. Many people confuse the word tribalism with tribe. When we say we do not want tribalism, we do not mean there should be no tribe. Tribes are here to stay.

— President Idi Amin

Besides ethnicity and security concerns, favoritism in the military was also determined by the political relations of the Ugandan government. When Amin began to forge strong links with various Muslim Arab powers, religion grew in importance and Muslims became more favored in the Uganda Army. As result, members of traditionally favored tribes who identified as Christians became marginalized, resulting in strife. In the end, Amin could not even rely on members of his own tribe, the Kakwa, to always stay loyal. Most prominently, Charles Arube was a Kakwa yet attempted a coup when he was marginalized by another officer, Hussein Malera. Overall, ethnicity was less important than personal connections in Amin's military. For example, one of the President's most important security agencies was led by a Lango by 1976. Several high-ranking officers who were Christian or did not belong to the favored tribes also remained in the Uganda Army up until Amin's regime collapsed, with Ali Fadhul and Isaac Maliyamungu being notable examples. Overall, the military remained a diverse force whose troops had a wide variety of backgrounds and accordingly different views on the character of their service. A large number continued to regard themselves as "career military professionals".

As result of all these factors, the factions in the military and its ethnic makeup changed significantly in course of Amin's presidency. According to researcher Andrew Rice, there were "cliques upon cliques" in the military which Amin empowered or disempowered as he saw fit. After the 1971 coup, Amin initially preferred to recruit and promote Kakwa, Nubians, Madi, Lugbara, and Alur, while members of other ethnic groups were gradually removed from the Uganda Army, as they were suspected of being disloyal. By 1973, about 35–50% of the military was made up of West Nile tribesmen; almost half of these were Lugbara. As result of repeated coup attempts and other factors, the Lugbara, Madi, and Alur also came under suspicion and were partially purged by 1973, leaving just the Kakwa and Nubians as core faction of the Uganda Army. At the same time, the growing number of Nubian soldiers also resulted from the blurring lines of tribal identities in the West Nile. Muslim and Kakwa troops were increasingly regarded as Nubians regardless of ethnic origin. By 1973, the Nubians constituted about 25–30% of the army. Despite the repeated purges, however, many Madi, Lugbara, and Alur soldiers remained in the army, though their influence was greatly reduced.

Even the Nubians and Kakwa remained a potential threat, so that Amin increasingly opted to rely on foreigners to keep the military loyal to his regime. The Uganda Army's foreign members were recruited from various neighboring countries, most importantly Sudan and Zaire. They were "lifted above both the ethnic pattern and religious affiliation". These troops were often ex-members of rebel groups with whom Amin had forged good relations such as the Anyanya from southern Sudan. They acted as de facto mercenaries. According to researcher Holger Bernt Hansen, the mercenary role of the Sudanese recruits was especially evident as the Anyanya rebels had fought against Islamization in their home areas, yet supported Amin's regime that favored Muslims. Amin believed the foreigners to be more dependent and therefore more loyal than most native Ugandans. By 1973, about 20–25% of the Uganda Army were foreigners, most being ex-Anyanya. Researchers Paul Nugent and Samuel Decalo estimated that as much as three-quarters of the military eventually consisted of foreigners. An anonymous UA major concurred, estimating that half of the military were Sudanese and Nubians, a quarter of Zairean origin, and another quarter of Ugandan natives by the 1978–79 war. Even though the foreigners often claimed membership in the same tribes to which the native Ugandan troops belonged, the latter saw them as outsiders and often held them in low regard. For example, Ugandan Nubians in Bombo, Kitgum, and Gulu resented the foreign Nubians as ruthless mercenaries. Accordingly, the foreigners were "seen as an instrument to neutralize the predominance of the ethnic factor" by Amin, though ultimately they did not ease ethnic tensions. Instead, rivalries developed between the foreign and native troops of the Uganda Army.

=== Military justice ===
A system of courts and military justice was established by the Armed Forces Act of 1964. Further broad guarantees of the right to a fair trial were assured by Uganda's succession of constitutions in the 1960s. Military tribunals convened by Amin during his rule frequently ignored constitutional and legal prescriptions. Most men called to serve on the panels were selected on the basis of their loyalty to the President and their willingness to convict political opponents of the regime; many were illiterate and had no understanding of Ugandan law. Defendants were often presumed to be guilty at the start of proceedings and were usually denied legal counsel. Most persons found guilty of an offence by a military tribunal were executed via firing squad. Many cases were prosecuted in secret and in some instances without the knowledge of the accused party. Though upon taking power Amin declared that he would subject soldiers accused of offences to tribunals, in practice many were killed without any legal process.

In 1973 Amin issued a decree expanding the reach of military tribunals to include the trial of civilians accused of committing capital offences. He also empowered himself to convene such tribunals for civilians believed to have been acting in a fashion to bring the government or army into disrepute. The President further expanded their jurisdiction into non-military matters with another decree in 1975.

=== Strength ===
The strength of the Uganda Army is not known for certain during the 1971–1979 period. As result of massive recruitment drives, coupled with regular purges, the number of military personnel fluctuated greatly. Accordingly, there exist estimates ranging from about 10,000 to more than 40,000 troops. The Associated Press stated in 1974 that the army was around 15,000 strong. According to Cooper and Fontanellaz, the Uganda Army was at least nominally 19,000 soldiers strong by January 1976, of whom 658 were officers, while the German newspaper Der Spiegel put its strength at 21,000 in 1977. A Ugandan major captured by the TPDF stated that the Uganda Army numbered 25,000 by 1978/79. One Ugandan officer claimed that the TPDF outnumbered the Uganda Army "by 3-1 ratio" during the conflict. It is often estimated that about 20,000 troops served in the Uganda Army on average during Amin's rule. It was one of the largest militaries in Africa at the time.

=== Structure ===
The Uganda Army consisted of its ground forces and the Uganda Army Air Force. It had no official navy. President Amin created a "small lake patrol" in 1977, though it was still in development at the time of his overthrow. Uganda had already acquired patrol boats and amphibious vehicles which marines operated on Lake Victoria by this time.

==== Known units ====
Unit	Alternative name(s)	Base(s)	Commander(s)	History
Eagle Colonel Gaddafi Battalion	1st Infantry Battalion (1UA); First Uganda Army Battalion; Jinja Battalion; First Battalion	Jinja	Isaac Maliyamungu (1974 – 1975); Hussein Mohammed (1975 – 1979)	established in 1960; Langi and Acholi troops in its ranks were massacred in July 1971; the unit was officially renamed to "Eagle Colonel Gaddafi Battalion" in January 1973 following a state visit by Libyan leader Muammar Gaddafi; Uganda–Tanzania War: fought in the Battle of Tororo and the Battle of Jinja; disintegrated in April 1979
Gondo Battalion	2nd Infantry Battalion (2UA); Gonda Battalion; Gondo Regiment; Second Battalion	Moroto	"Lieutenant Colonel Ozo" (c. 1973); Abdulatif Tiyua (c. 1977); Yefusa Bananuka (1978 – 1979)	established in 1963; Langi and Acholi troops in its ranks were massacred in July 1971; Uganda–Tanzania War: fought in the Invasion of Kagera and the Battle of Mutukula; many of its soldiers fled back to Moroto after the defeat at Mutukula; disintegrated in April 1979: troops mostly fled to northern Uganda and Kenya; 78 surrendered to local Karamojong rebels and later the TPDF; some defected to the Karamojong insurgents
Tiger Battalion	3rd Infantry Battalion (3UA); Third Battalion; Tiger Regiment	Mubende	Abiriga (c. 1977)	established in 1965; allegedly mutinied in 1977 and seized control of Mubende until being subdued by other troops Uganda–Tanzania War: fought in the Battle of Sembabule
Simba Battalion	4th Infantry Battalion (4UA); Simba Mechanised Battalion; Simba Mechanised Regiment; Mbarara battalion	Mbarara (Note: According to journalist Dominique Lagarde, the Simba Battalion was based in Mbarara, Masaka, and Mutukula in 1978.)	Ali Fadhul (1971–1974); Hussein Marijan and Issa Fataki (c. 1977)	established in 1965; Langi and Acholi troops in its ranks were massacred in July 1971; defeated an invasion of Obote loyalists from Tanzania in 1972; Adrisi loyalists in the unit allegedly mutinied in October 1978; Uganda–Tanzania War: fought in the Invasion of Kagera; a company of the Simba Battalion unsuccessfully defended the border settlements of Kasese, Murema, Kigarama in the Kikagati sub-district on 20 January 1979; had disintegrated by late March 1979
Malire Battalion	5th Mechanised Specialist Reconnaissance Regiment; 5th Mechanised Malire Regiment; 5th Malire Specialist Machanised Regiment; Marile Mechanised Specialist Recce Regiment; Malire Reconnaissance Regiment; Bondo Battalion; Bombo Battalion	Camp Malire in Kampala, Bombo (Note: According to Tom Cooper and Adrien Fontanellaz, the unit officially relocated from Camp Malire to Masaka in 1971. According to Tony Avirgan and Martha Honey, the unit was posted in Camp Malire as of March 1974 and following a revolt it was moved to Bombo. John Darnton stated in 1979 that Bombo served as the unit's headquarters.)	Asumani Mussa (? – July 1973); Juma Butabika (c. 1973 – ?); Godwin Sule (c. 1974)	established in 1967; the unit split into soldiers loyal to Amin and Obote during the 1971 coup; members of the unit revolted in March 1974 and tried to overthrow Amin during Operation Mafuta Mingi in June 1977; Uganda–Tanzania War: fought in the Invasion of Kagera; regarded as one of the last units loyal to Amin; it protected his headquarters in Kampala by late March 1979 and was reportedly involved in his last attempts to stop the Tanzanian advance south of the capital
Suicide Battalion	Suicide Regiment; Mechanised Suicide Battalion; Revolutionary Suicide Mechanised Regiment; Revolutionary Mechanised Suicide Battalion; Second Simba Mechanized Battalion; Masaka Mechanised Regiment	Masaka	Isaac Maliyamungu (1973); Baker Tretre (? – 1974); Christopher Gore (c. 1977); Nasur Ezega (? – May 1978); Bernard Rwehururu (? – 1979)	Lugbara members of the unit mutinied at Mbarara in November 1974; Adrisi loyalists in the unit allegedly mutinied in October 1978; Uganda–Tanzania War: fought in the Battle of Mutukula; the Battle of Masaka; and possibly in the Battle of Lukaya or the Battle of Sembabule; disintegrated after the Battle of Sembabule; its troops fled to the West Nile region, Sudan and Zaire
Chui Battalion	Leopard Battalion; Chui Regiment; Cheetah Regiment	Gulu	Yefusa Bananuka (c. 1977) "Major Zziwa" (c. 1978); Juma Butabika (unspecified date)	established around 1972–1973; defeated an invasion of armed Acholi and Langi militants from southern Sudan in April 1972; Adrisi loyalists in the unit allegedly mutinied in October 1978; Uganda–Tanzania War: fought in the Battle of Masaka; the Battle of Lukaya; the unit disintegrated during March 1979, though remnants fought in the Fall of Kampala
Paratroopers Military School	Paratroop Unit	Lubiri in Kampala	Dusman Sabuni (unspecified date); Michael Akonyu (c. 1974); Godwin Sule (c. 1977–1979)	Uganda–Tanzania War: Its commander Godwin Sule led the Ugandan forces during the Battle of Lukaya and was killed in action
2nd Paratrooper Battalion	Mountains of the Moon Battalion; 2nd Para Battalion	Fort Portal	"Lieutenant Colonel Ona"; Yorokamu Tizihwayo (1974–?); Francis Itabuka (1977–?); Moses Galla (unspecified date)	established in 1969; Uganda–Tanzania War: fought in the Invasion of Kagera, and the Battle of Gayaza Hills
Air & Sea Battalion		Tororo	"Lieutenant Colonel Doka" (1973); Amin Lomo (c. 1974)	Uganda–Tanzania War: split into loyalists and rebels in 1979, fought in the Battle of Tororo
Marine Regiment	Marines Unit; Marine Brigade	Camp Bugolobi in Kampala	"Lieutenant Colonel Ibrahim"; Taban Lupayi (1974 – 1979)	helped to defeat the coup attempt of March 1974; reportedly employed to crush the mutinies of October 1978; Uganda–Tanzania War: fought in the Invasion of Kagera;
Artillery & Signals Regiment	Artillery Regiment	Masindi	Abdu Kisuule (1973 – 1979)	Uganda–Tanzania War: fought in the Invasion of Kagera; and the Battle of Lukaya
Kifaru Regiment	Kifaru Mechanised Specialist Reconnaissance Regiment; Kifavu Mechanised Regiment; Kifaru Mechanised Reconnaissance Regiment	Bondo	"Lieutenant Colonel Gabriel" (1974 – ?) "Lieutenant Colonel Aeskol" (c. 1977)	Uganda–Tanzania War: fought in the Invasion of Kagera; and the Battle of Bondo; the unit's base at Bondo was deserted in May 1979
Eastern Brigade	1st Infantry Brigade	Mbale	"Lieutenant Colonel Ozo" (1973–?); Yusuf Gowon (c. 1977); Abdulatif Tiyua (1979)	Uganda–Tanzania War: fought in the Battle of Masaka; and the Battle of Tororo; last Uganda Army unit to exit eastern Uganda in 1979 (troops fled to Kenya)
Western Brigade	Western command	Kasese	Yorokamu Tizihwayo (? – 1979); Yakobo Abiriga (1979)	established April 1978; Uganda–Tanzania War: Its commander Yorokamu Tizihwayo was executed during the conflict because a Tanzanian propaganda programme claimed that he was in contact with FRONASA rebels.
2nd Infantry Brigade	Simba Mechanized Brigade	Masaka (until 1973); Mbarara (from 1973); Nakasero	Ali Fadhul (from 1973)	unit renamed from "2nd Infantry Brigade" to "2nd Mechanized Brigade" and headquarters moved from Masaka to Mbarara in 1973
Special Commando Division				defeated the revolt by Lugbara members of the Suicide Battalion in November 1974;
Military Police		Camp Makindye in Kampala	Hussein Marella (Note: also known as Hussein Malera and Hussein Mulera) (1971 – 1974, ? – 1979); Albert Drajua (1974 – ?)	established in 1967; used as security agency by President Amin and employed to kill or arrest dissidents
Presidential Guard				established after 1971; mostly recruited Kakwa; operated as Amin's bodyguards as well as enforcers, and also used as security agency; played a crucial role in defending Amin during the Arube coup; Uganda–Tanzania War: A team of Presidential Guards led by Sergeant Tirikwendera took President Amin's children to safety during the war
Border Guard		Fort Portal	Oboma Ayum (1971)	
Uganda Army Air Force	UAAF; Ugandan Air Force	Entebbe	Wilson Toko (? – 1973); Smuts Guweddeko (1973 – 1974); Zeddy Maruru (1974 – 1975); Idi Amin (1975 – ?); Godwin Sule (acting, c. 1976); Christopher Gore (1978 – 1979); Andrew Mukooza (1979)	established in 1964; suffered great losses during Operation Entebbe in 1976; air force members attempted to overthrow Amin during Operation Mafuta Mingi in June 1977; Uganda–Tanzania War: fought in an air campaign against the Tanzania Air Defence Command during the war, and was involved in the Invasion of Kagera, Battle of Simba Hills, Battle of Tororo, and the Battle of Entebbe

== Equipment ==
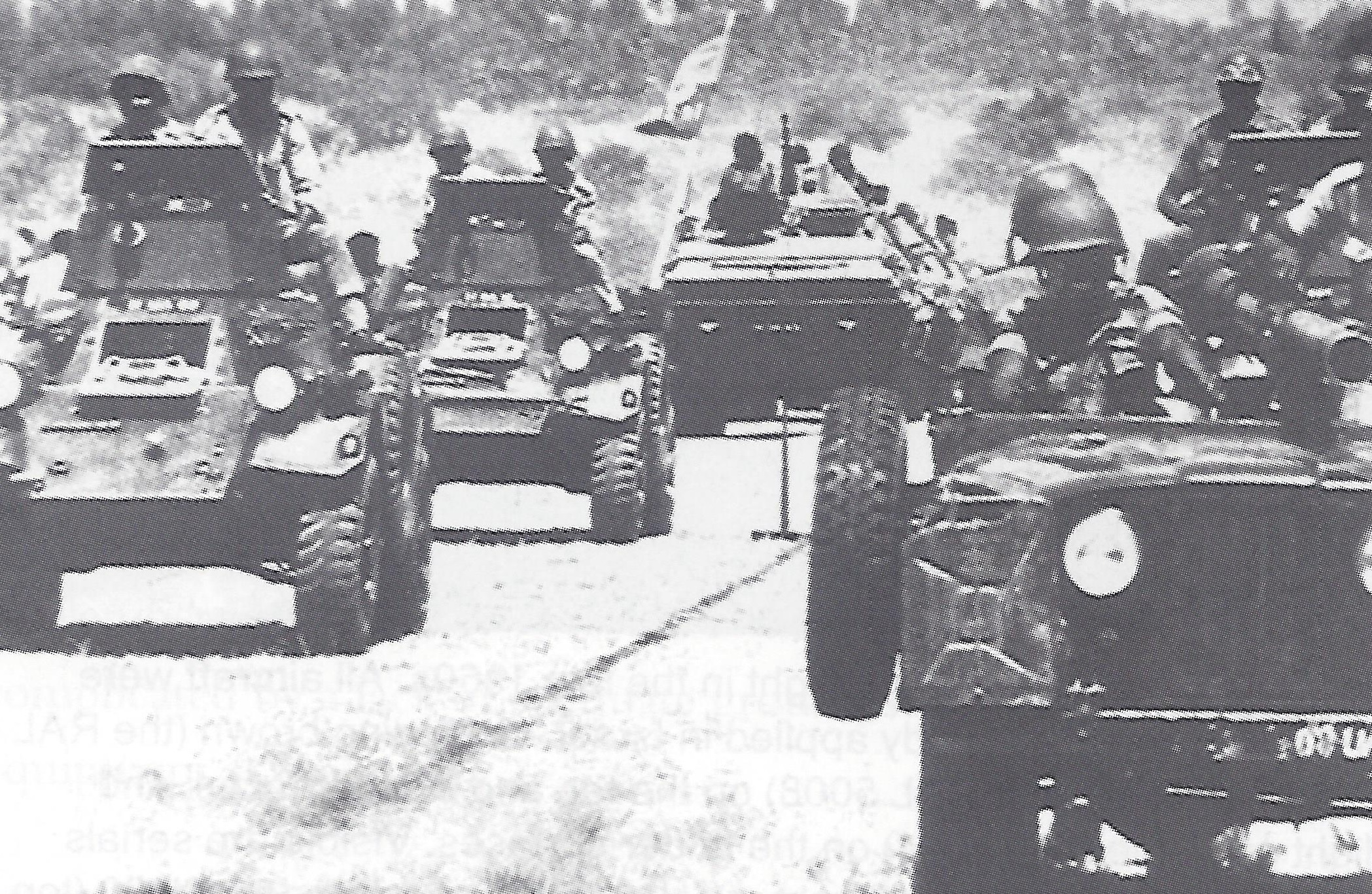
Uganda Army OT-64 APCs, Ferret armoured cars, and jeeps in the late 1960s

The Uganda Army was well-equipped with weaponry during the rule of Idi Amin. Beginning in 1973, he imported large quantities of arms from the Soviet Union and Libya, ranging from tanks to aircraft to missiles. Amin reportedly "loved military pageantry and weaponry", investing much energying in equipping the Uganda Army with military hardware. The standard infantry rifle was the Heckler & Koch G3.

The Uganda Army's armoured fighting vehicle force was regarded as one of the strongest of the region. The country had already possessed 12 M4A1(76) Sherman tanks, around 20 Ferret armoured cars, and 12 OT-64B armoured personnel carriers (APCs) before the 1971 coup. Amin consequently imported large quantities of armoured fighting vehicles from the Soviet Union and Libya. Uganda received 16 T-55A tanks and 62 APCS from the Soviets, as well as 16 Alvis Saracen armoured cars from Libya in 1973 and 1974. In 1975, the Soviet Union provided Uganda with military supplies worth $48 million, compared with just $12 million in economic aid. From this time onward, however, relations with the Soviet Union worsened, resulting in the reduction of military aid and supplies. Libya also gifted Uganda ten T-34/85 tanks in 1976. From 1977 onward the army made fewer foreign acquisitions. By 1978, the Uganda Army's ground forces possessed 10 T-34, 15 T-54/T-55, and 10 M-4 tanks, 250 Alvis Saracen armoured cars, and an unspecified number of BRDM amphibious vehicles, OT-64 APCs, as well as Ferret, BTR-40, and BTR-152 armoured cars. At the time of the outbreak of the war with Tanzania, the Uganda Army was one of the most mechanised forces in Africa.

The Uganda Army's artillery included 76 mm and 122 mm cannons, 82 mm and 120 mmm mortars, Sagger anti-tank missiles, and fifty 40 mm anti-aircraft guns by 1978.

The Uganda Army Air Force (UAAF) was also expanded during Amin's presidency. Before Operation Entebbe, about 65 aircraft and helicopters were in use. In 1976 a helicopter and some small transport aircraft were purchased from the United States. By 1979, the UAAF still had access to several dozen fighter and trainer aircraft, though the exact number remains unclear. It possessed MiG-21MFs, MiG-21UMs, MiG-17s, MiG-15UTIs, and L-29s. Furthermore, several transport aircraft were in service, including a Lockheed C-130 Hercules cargo transport.

== Foreign trainers, advisers, and military attachés ==
Under Idi Amin's rule, several foreign countries supported the Uganda Army by sending advisers. The first military mission from the Soviet Union was sent to Uganda in 1973. By Amin's late reign, the Soviet experts were headed by Colonel Datsenko until January 1979 when he was replaced by Colonel Protassenia. In addition, Ugandan soldiers were trained and aided by Palestine Liberation Organisation militants, Pakistani experts, and Iraqi advisors. Military attachés were also attached to several embassies in Kampala and occasionally called on for help by Ugandan authorities.

Thousands of Ugandan troops were sent for training into the Soviet Union, Second Czechoslovak Republic, Libya, and North Korea.
