= Mustafa Adrisi =

Vice President of Uganda from 1977 to 1979

3rd Vice President of Uganda
- In office January 1977 – 1979
- President: Idi Amin
- Preceded by: John Babiiha
- Succeeded by: Paulo Muwanga

Minister of Defence of Uganda
- In office ? – 8 May 1978
- President: Idi Amin

Minister of Internal Affairs of Uganda
- In office 16 February 1977 – 8 May 1978
- President: Idi Amin
- Preceded by: Charles Oboth Ofumbi

Uganda Army Chief of Staff
- In office 1974 – January 1977
- President: Idi Amin
- Preceded by: Hussein Marella (acting); Charles Arube (de jure)
- Succeeded by: Isaac Lumago

Personal details
- Born: 1922 British Uganda
- Died: 28 July 2013 (aged 90–91) Kampala, Uganda
- Spouse: 8
- Relations: Idi Amin
- Nickname: "Mr. Foreign Exchange"

Military service
- Allegiance: British Empire (1951–1962); Uganda (1962–1979); UNRF (1980–1987)
- Branch/service: King's African Rifles; Uganda Army; Uganda National Rescue Front
- Years of service: 1951–1987
- Rank: General
- Commands: Military Police Force; Uganda Army
- Battles/wars: Mau Mau Rebellion; 1972 invasion of Uganda; Uganda–Tanzania War; Ugandan Bush War

Mustafa Adrisi Abataki (c. 1922 – 28 July 2013) was a Ugandan military officer and politician who served as the third vice president of Uganda from 1977 to 1979 and was one of President Idi Amin's closest associates before the two fell out.

In 1978, Adrisi was injured in a suspicious car accident. Following that incident, troops loyal to him mutinied and Amin sent troops against the mutineers, some of whom had fled across the Tanzanian border, possibly contributing to the Uganda–Tanzania War. As the Ugandan war effort collapsed, Adrisi fled to Sudan where he claimed to retain the post of Vice President. He briefly became involved in the rebel activities of the Uganda National Rescue Front (UNRF) during the Ugandan Bush War, before returning from exile in 1987. He struggled with health problems in his later life and died in 2013.

== Early life ==
Mustafa Adrisi was born into the Picara clan of the Aringa ethnic group in Yumbe District, Uganda. (Note: Journalists Tony Avirgan and Martha Honey described Adrisi as Lugbara.) He enrolled in the Lodonga Demonstration Primary School in Lodonga. After completing the fourth grade, the Catholic missionaries in charge of the school attempted to convert him from Islam to Christianity and gave him the Christian name Christopher. Adrisi instead dropped out and never completed his education. As a result of this, he was never fully literate.

Adrisi practiced polygamy and, over the course of his life, married eight women and fathered multiple children, though by the time of his death he had lost seven of his wives to death or divorce.

== Military career ==
In 1951 Adrisi was drafted into the King's African Rifles. He was trained in Nanyuki, Kenya Colony. During his early years of military service, Adrisi acquired property in Keri, Koboko District, Uganda. In 1952 he was promoted to the rank of lance corporal. After additional training and participating in the suppression of the Mau Mau Rebellion in Kenya, he was promoted to corporal. After assuming the rank of sergeant major, he enrolled in the police cadet school in Entebbe, Uganda. While on leave he was promoted to the rank of lieutenant. On 1 January 1967 the Ugandan government, in an attempt to instill discipline in the Uganda Army, created the Military Police Force and gave command of the unit to Adrisi and a second lieutenant. After receiving training from the Israelis, he was made captain. Over the next few years he served as second-in command of the Mbarara barracks and the Mbuya army headquarters, and served as a military police instructor as well as officer commanding the Malire Regiment.

In 1971, he was promoted to the rank of lieutenant colonel. That year, Colonel Idi Amin launched a coup d'état and became President of Uganda. Adrisi was Amin's uncle and brother-in-law. Two years later he was given command of the army brigade based in Mbale. Adrisi was made Uganda Army chief of staff as a concession to the increasingly disgruntled Lugbara troops who had revolted during the Arube uprising in March 1974. In 1975 Adrisi was made general and commander of the army. He was later made Minister of Defence. Adrisi also became infamous for his extreme corruption, using his positions to siphon off large amounts of government money for himself. In this way, he earned the nickname "Mr. Foreign Exchange".

== Vice President of Uganda ==
In January 1977 President Amin removed Adrisi from his post as army chief of staff and appointed him Vice President of Uganda. Amin had ruled Uganda without a vice president for six years, and his decision to give Adrisi the job probably stemmed from his wish to appease soldiers who wanted the dismissal of Brigadier Hussein Marella, an ally of Amin who had killed a prominent Lugbara officer. Adrisi was instructed to resign from his post as Minister of Defence, but declined to do so. That year a split in the Uganda Army developed between supporters of Amin and soldiers loyal to Adrisi, who held significant power in the government and wanted to purge foreigners, particularly Sudanese, from the military. Adrisi felt that foreigners were not dependent enough on the regime to support it, and would at their convenience flee back to their lands of origin. He thought that it would be best if the Uganda Army was made up of northern Ugandans who had a larger stake in fighting for it. The resulting tension in the army was further exacerbated when Adrisi got in a shootout with Colonel Taban Lupayi, the head of the marines. Despite threatening civilians earlier in his career, Adrisi was increasingly viewed by segments of the army and general populace as a proponent of a return to law and order, as he had freed several civilian detainees and publicly condemned extrajudicial killings. He later testified that Amin had summoned him four times to accuse him of plotting a coup, which he repeatedly denied. According to journalist George Ivan Smith, Adrisi was also involved in a purge of Langi and Acholi in 1977, during which a large number of civilians were murdered in northern Uganda. By the end of the year he also held the post of Minister of Internal Affairs, having taken over the job after the death of the previous incumbent, Charles Oboth Ofumbi.

On the morning of 19 April 1978 while traveling to a police station in Jinja, Adris's car was involved in an accident in Mbalala. A stationed wagon collided with his vehicle from the front, and then his escort vehicle rear-ended his vehicle. A shootout between Adrisi's bodyguards and the security personnel in the escort vehicle ensued, and several people were killed. Adrisi was then flown to Cairo for treatment of head injuries and multiple fractures in his leg. While he was there, Amin declared on 8 May that he was stripping him of his positions as Minister of Defence and Minister of Internal Affairs and denounced him for retiring senior prison officials without his knowledge. Amin also demoted or dismissed numerous government officials, most of whom had been supportive of Adrisi. Unrest grew in the military as a result of the incident, since many of Adrisi's followers believed that the car accident was a failed assassination attempt orchestrated by Amin. Adrisi himself never accused Amin of being behind the accident. After about a month Adrisi returned to Uganda and re-assumed his post as vice president. (Note: According to journalist Faustin Mugabe, Adrisi was still being treated at an Egyptian military hospital (or had returned there) when he was visited there by Amin in October 1978. Mugabe based this account on stories published by the Voice of Uganda, the Ugandan state newspaper, which included a photo of Amin and Adrisi together in said hospital.) Advised that he should take time to recuperate, he retired to his home in Keri.

In 1979 Tanzanian forces and the Uganda National Liberation Front invaded Uganda and occupied the country. When they entered the town of Koboko, the seat of the eponymous district, Adrisi fled to Kaya, Sudan with over 2,000 cattle. His three-house home was consequently destroyed with dynamite by the Tanzanian-led forces. He, his family, and their entourage initially found refuge in Yei. The Sudanese government later moved him to the village of Lutaya, where many former officials of Amin's regime were housed. While in exile in Sudan, Adrisi still claimed to be Vice President of Uganda.

== Later life ==
In 1980 Adrisi, Moses Ali, and several other military officers of Amin's extant regime formed the Uganda National Rescue Front (UNRF), a rebel group to retake control of Uganda. The following year Ali began attacking Uganda, and the government requested that Sudanese authorities halt Adrisi's and his colleagues' activities. The Sudanese government subsequently arrested them and took them to Juba for questioning. They were released three weeks later.

Following Yoweri Museveni's assumption of the Ugandan Presidency, Adrisi requested that he be repatriated to Uganda. He was scheduled to return in January 1987, but threats posed by members of the UNRF who wanted to continue the insurgency delayed his return until April. Adrisi arrived in Uganda impoverished, and was given a government-owned house in Arua District. The Ugandan government later established a commission to investigate human rights abuses committed during Amin's regime. Adrisi testified against his former colleagues. The commission did not find any conclusive evidence that Adrisi was involved in any atrocities during his service in the regime.

After falling ill in 2008, the Ugandan government flew Adrisi to Mulago Hospital in Kampala. He briefly fell into a coma, but after recovering and being discharged, the government permanently located him to another house in Kampala so it could monitor his health. He died at Mulago Hospital on 28 July 2013 due to complications from a broken leg, diabetes, and hypertension. He was buried in a state funeral in Keri on 1 August.

== Works cited ==
- Avirgan, Tony; Honey, Martha (1983). War in Uganda: The Legacy of Idi Amin. Dar es Salaam: Tanzania Publishing House. ISBN 978-9976-1-0056-3.
- Decalo, Samuel (2019). Psychoses Of Power: African Personal Dictatorships. Routledge. ISBN 9781000308501.
- Legum, Colin, ed. (1979). Africa Contemporary Record: Annual Survey and Documents : 1977–1978. Vol. X. New York: Africana Publishing Company. ISBN 9780841901599.
- Lowman, Thomas James (2020). Beyond Idi Amin: Causes and Drivers of Political Violence in Uganda, 1971-1979 (PDF) (PhD). Durham University.
- Omara-Otunnu, Amii (1987). Politics and the Military in Uganda, 1890–1985. London: Palgrave Macmillan. ISBN 978-1-349-18738-6.
- Reid, Richard J. (2017). A History of Modern Uganda. Cambridge: Cambridge University Press. ISBN 978-1-107-06720-2.
- Rice, Andrew (2009). The Teeth May Smile But the Heart Does Not Forget: Murder and Memory in Uganda. New York City: Henry Holt and Company. ISBN 978-0-8050-7965-4.
- Singh, Madanjeet (2012). Culture of the Sepulchre: Idi Amin's Monster Regime. New Delhi: Penguin Books India. ISBN 978-0-670-08573-6.
- Smith, George Ivan (1980). Ghosts of Kampala. London: Weidenfeld & Nicolson. ISBN 978-0060140274.
