= Former Uganda National Army =

Ugandan rebel group

- Leaders: Isaac Lumago; Amin Onzi
- Dates active: 1980–1996/1997
- Active regions: Northern Uganda, Zaire, and Sudan
- Ideology: Idi Amin loyalism
- Size: ~1,500

The Former Uganda National Army (abbreviated as FUNA) was a Ugandan rebel group active during the Ugandan Bush War and the subsequent insurgencies in the country. The group claimed to be a continuation of the Uganda Army under Idi Amin and was made up mostly of Amin loyalists. It came to be led by General Isaac Lumago and Brigadier Amin Onzi. The group was mainly active in Northern Uganda as well as Zaire and Sudan, where they operated rear bases and acquired weapons and equipment.

Initially, the group fought against the government of Milton Obote until 1985, when military officer Tito Okello launched a coup and ousted Obote's government. From then until the ascension of Yoweri Museveni as president in 1986, the FUNA supported Okello's government against the rebelling National Resistance Movement. After Museveni took power, FUNA once again became a rebel movement. FUNA disbanded in the late 1990s and many of its fighters joined the UNRF II and the West Nile Bank Front.

== History ==
=== Origins ===
The FUNA had its origins in the initial West Nile rebellion that began the Ugandan Bush War in 1980. Loyalists to the deposed Amin regime launched a rebellion in the West Nile region, aiming to overthrow Milton Obote. These loyalist forces were disorganized and led by a number of commanders, some who even had questioned their loyalty to the past government. This resulted in a split between those who wanted to distance themselves from Amin and those who remained specifically loyal to him. Those who wanted to distance themselves formed the Uganda National Rescue Front (UNRF) and the loyalists established FUNA.

=== Early operations ===
FUNA maintained that it was the same Uganda Army that operated during the Amin regime, with its leader Isaac Lumago stating "the structure of the army that went into exile after Amin’s overthrow remains intact in southern Sudan and eastern Zaire" in 1985. FUNA often fought with the UNRF and was eventually expelled from the country around July 1981. FUNA continued to be active in Zaire and Sudan throughout the Bush War, although remaining smaller and weaker than its UNRF rival. It continued to launch attacks on Uganda and be a nuisance to government forces.

=== Integration into government ===
In July 1985, General Tito Okello launched a coup that overthrew Obote's government. Okello's new regime managed to successfully make peace with a number of armed groups, including the FUNA. This enabled FUNA to be integrated into the national military and it gained a seat on Okello's junta council. Okello ruled until early 1986, when he was overthrown by the National Resistance Army, with Yoweri Museveni taking power. This effectively ended FUNA's integration into the government and it returned to an insurgency.

=== Later operations and dissolution ===
Even after the official end of the Bush War, FUNA continued operating during the insurgencies in Uganda in the late 1980s and early '90s. The NRA managed to get parts of FUNA to integrate into government forces, but elements of the group continued to be active. In early 1990, FUNA officers held several meetings in Zaire and the group also reportedly launched several raids into Ugandan territory. The group continued to be minorly active throughout the early to mid 1990s, but was largely eclipsed by other Ugandan rebel movements

FUNA was operational until at least 1996, but the rise of the West Nile Bank Front and the Uganda National Rescue Front II led to a number of FUNA fighters and officers defecting to join the new insurgent groups. It is not known precisely when FUNA disbanded, but reports of its activity ceased after 1997.
