= Kampala–Mpigi Expressway =

Road in Uganda

Coordinates: 00°15′54″N 32°25′49″E

Route information
- Length: 22 mi (35 km)
- History: Designated in 2020; Expected completion in 2030

Major junctions
- North end: Busega
- Kyengera; Nsangi; Maya
- South end: Mpigi

Location
- Country: Uganda

Highway system
- Roads in Uganda

The Kampala–Mpigi Expressway, also Busega–Mpigi Expressway, is a four-lane, dual carriage highway under construction in the Central Region of Uganda, connecting, Kampala, the capital city, and Mpigi, the headquarters of Mpigi District.

== Location ==
The road starts at Busega, a neighborhood in Rubaga Division in the city of Kampala. It continues in a southwesterly direction, through Kyengera, Nabbingo and Nsangi to end at Mpigi, a distance of approximately 28.5 kilometres (18 mi). The expressway is a component of the Kampala–Masaka Road.

== Background ==
The current road is a two-lane single carriageway in good condition. The government of Uganda plans to widen the road to a four-lane dual carriage highway, as part of its efforts to decongest Kampala. The construction is planned to be funded under a public-private partnership arrangement.

The design includes four major interchanges at Nabbingo, Nsangi, Maya and Lugala. These interchanges will allow connection with the Kampala Northern Bypass Highway and the Entebbe–Kampala Expressway. The government of Uganda has secured funding of US$91 million (UShs322 billion) to fund the 23 kilometres (14 mi) section between Busega and Mpigi. The 9.5 kilometres (6 mi) section between Kibuye and Busega is to be expanded by China Communications Construction Company (CCCC), with funding from the Exim Bank of China, once CCCC has completed the Entebbe-Kampala Expressway.

== Timetable ==
In 2014, the China Communications Construction Company, which was also commissioned to build the Entebbe–Kampala Expressway, was contracted to construct an interchange at Busega which connects the two expressways. To save money and time, the same contractor was hired to construct the section between Kibuye and Busega, measuring about 9 kilometres (6 mi). In December 2016, the Daily Monitor reported that construction was expected to begin in 2018 and last three years. In July 2019, after delays, the construction contract was awarded to a consortium of Chinese companies, that includes China Civil Engineering Construction Corporation (CCECC) and China Railway 19th Bureau Group Company Limited. Construction was expected to last 36 months, with commissioning planned for the second half of 2022. Construction began in May 2020 and completion was expected sometime in 2023.

Due to delays occasioned by the COVID-19 pandemic, compensation disputes and other challenges, only 15 percent of the work had been completed as of March 2022. At that time, a new completion date was given as being 2025. In October 2024, completion was pushed back to 2027. In November 2025, reliable Ugandan online media reported a new completion date of 2030.

== Funding ==
As of November 2025, the sources of funding for this road project are as outlined in the table below:

Kampala–Mpigi Expressway Funding
Rank	Development partner	Contribution in Euros	Percentage	Notes
1	African Development Bank (First Tranche)	176.26 million	41.51	Loan
2	African Development Bank (Second Tranche)	188.18 million	44.31	Loan
3	African Development Fund	28.31 million	6.67	Loan
4	NEPAD IPPF	0.88 million	0.21	Grant
4	Government of Uganda	30.98 million	7.30	Investment
	Total	424.61 million	100.00	

== Developments ==
As of November 2023, only 30 percent of the civil work had been completed. The delay is blamed on the swampy topography, the COVID-19 pandemic, "resistance and legal battles involving at least 490 Project Affected Persons and rejection of approved compensation by others". As of September 2024, an estimated 43 percent of civil works had been completed.

== See also ==
- List of roads in Uganda
