= Namirembe Bitamazire =

Ugandan academic and politician (1941–2026)

- Born: 17 July 1941; Central Region, Protectorate of Uganda
- Died: 14 January 2026 (aged 84)
- Education: Makerere University (Diploma in Education) (Bachelor of Arts) (Master of Arts)
- Occupations: Academic, politician
- Years active: 1971–2011
- Known for: Politics

Geraldine Namirembe Bitamazire (17 July 1941 – 14 January 2026) was a Ugandan academic and politician. She was the Chancellor of the Uganda Management Institute. She was minister of education from 1979 to 1980 and again from 2005 to 2011. She also served as the member of parliament representing Mpigi District women in the Ugandan Parliament from 2001 to 2011.

== Early life and education ==
Bitamazire was born on 17 July 1941 in the Central Region of Protectorate of Uganda. She attended Trinity College Nabbingo for her high school education. She went on to obtain a Diploma in education from Makerere University in 1964. She followed that with a Bachelor of Arts degree in 1967 and a Master of Arts degree in 1987, both from Makerere University.

== Career ==
From 1971 to 1973, she served as a director of the East African Harbours Corporation, part of the first East African Community. She also served as the headteacher of the Tororo Girls School from 1971 to 1974. From 1974 to 1979, she served as a senior education officer in Uganda's Ministry of Education and Sports. In 1979, she was appointed minister of education, serving in that capacity until 1980. From 1981 until 1996, Bitamazire was the deputy chairperson of the Teaching Service Commission. She was appointed as minister of state for education in 1999, serving in that capacity until 2005, when she was appointed minister of education and sports. In 2010, Mpigi District was split into three parts; Butambala District, Gomba District, and the smaller Mpigi District of today. During the 2011 national elections, Bitamazire was defeated in the primaries by Mariam Nalubega, also of the National Resistance Movement (NRM) political party, in Butambala District. In the cabinet reshuffle of 27 May 2011, Bitamazire was dropped from the cabinet and was replaced by Jessica Alupo.

Bitamazire later served as the chancellor of the Uganda Management Institute, a public, degree-awarding, tertiary institution of higher education, with accreditation equivalent to a university.

== Personal life and death ==
Bitamazire was married to Alphonce Bitamazire of the Uganda People's Defence Force. She belonged to the NRM political party. She was a member of the United Nations Commission on the Status of Women from 1998 to 2001 and was a founding member of the Forum for African Women Educationalists.

Bitamazire died on 14 January 2026, at the age of 84.

== See also ==
- List of university leaders in Uganda
