= Gombe General Hospital =

Coordinates: 00°10′59″N 32°06′54″E

- Uganda Ministry of Health

Geography
- Location: Gombe, Butambala District, Uganda

Organisation
- Care system: Public
- Type: General

Services
- Emergency department: I
- Beds: 100

History
- Founded: 1969

Links
- Other links: Hospitals in Uganda

Gombe General Hospital, also Gombe District Hospital or Gombe Hospital, is a hospital in the Central Region of Uganda.

== Location ==
The hospital is located off of the Mpigi–Kabulasoke–Maddu–Sembabule Road, in the central business district of the town of Gombe, approximately 70 kilometres (43 mi) southwest of Mulago National Referral Hospital. This is about 81 kilometres (50 mi) northeast of Masaka Regional Referral Hospital.

== Overview ==
Gombe Hospital was established in 1969 by the first government of Prime Minister Milton Obote. It is a general hospital that serves the population of Butambala District and that of Gomba District and parts of the districts of Mpigi and Mityana, a population of about 250,000 human beings.

== Renovations ==
In 2015, the Government of Uganda, with loans from International Development Partners, began the renovation of 25 public general hospitals, including Gombe General Hospital. In 2013, the hospital's laboratory, underwent renovations under a joint program by PEPFAR and USAID, known as SUSTAIN. In 2014, the hospital beds were refurbished and bedding supplied by the Canadian NGO called CanAssist African Relief Trust, at a cost of approximately $5,000.

== Recent developments ==
In 2015, the hospital adopted palliative care, as part of its vision and mission.

== See also ==
- List of hospitals in Uganda
