= Maya, Uganda =

Maya
- Map of Uganda showing the location of Maya
- Coordinates: 00°15′59″N 32°26′09″E
- Country: Uganda
- Region: Central Uganda
- District: Wakiso District
- County: Busiro
- Constituency: Busiro South
- Elevation: 1,214 m (3,983 ft)

Population (2009 Estimate)
  - Total: 3,100
- Time zone: UTC+3 (EAT)

Maya is a town in the Central Region of Uganda. It is one of the urban centers in Wakiso District.

== Location ==
Maya is located in Maya Parish, Nsangi sub-county, Busiro County, Wakiso District, in Uganda's Central Region. It is located along the Kampala–Masaka Road, approximately 27 kilometres (17 mi), southwest of Kampala, the capital and largest city of Uganda. This is about 15 kilometres (9 mi), by road, north-east of Mpigi Town, the nearest large town. The coordinates of Maya are: 0°15'59.0"N, 32°26'09.0"E (Latitude:0.266389; Longitude:32.435833). Maya, Uganda is situated at an average elevation of 1,214 metres (3,983 ft), above sea level.

== Overview ==
Maya is located in Wakiso District, one of the fastest growing districts in Uganda. This area is attractive to those looking for land to build residential houses, schools and commercial buildings. Maya is an area, in relative proximity to Kampala, situated on a major highway, where land prices are relatively affordable. This has also increased the number of land disputes in the area.

== Population ==
The Uganda Bureau of Statistics estimated the population of Maya at 3,100, in 2009.

== Points of interest ==
The following points of interest are found within the town limits or near the town boundaries: (a) The offices of Maya Town Council (b) Maya Central Market (c) Fiduga Flower Plantation, a horticultural growing and exporting enterprise (d) International Paramedical Institute (e) The Kampala–Masaka Road - The highway passes through town in a northeast to southwest direction (e) London College of St. Lawrence, a private, mixed, residential high school.

== See also ==
- Nsangi
- Wakiso
- List of floriculture companies in Uganda
