= Busega =

- Map of Kampala showing the location of Busega.
- Coordinates: 00°18′36″N 32°31′12″E
- Country: Uganda
- Region: Central Uganda
- District: Kampala Capital City Authority
- Division: Lubaga Division
- Elevation: 1,200 m (3,900 ft)
- Time zone: UTC+3 (EAT)

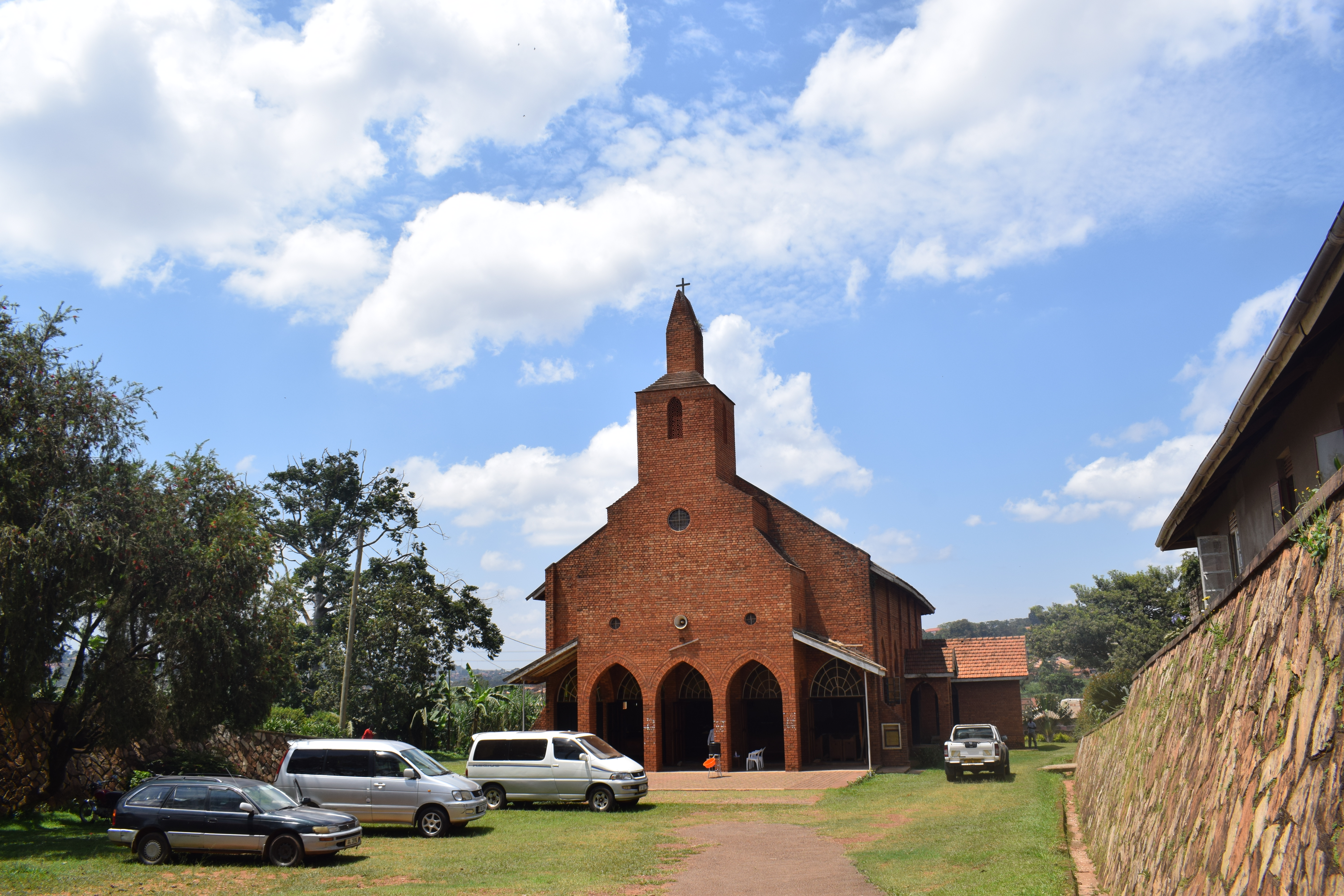

Busega is a neighborhood within Kampala, the capital and largest city of Uganda.

== Location ==
Busega is situated in Rubaga Division, one of the five administrative divisions of Kampala. Busega is bordered by unincorporated Wakiso District to the north, Namungoona to the northeast, Lungujja to the east, Nateete to the south, and Buloba to the west. The neighborhood is approximately 8 kilometres (5.0 mi) southwest of Kampala's central business district. The coordinates of Busega are 0°18'36.0"N, 32°31'12.0"E (Latitude:0.3100; Longitude:32.5200).

== Overview ==
Busega holds historical significance as the location of the first recorded killing of young Christians Makko Kakumba, Yusuf Rugarama, and Nuwa Sserwanga, all of them belonging to the Anglican faith. They were dismembered and burned on 31 January 1885 on the orders of Mwanga II, the Kabaka of Buganda.

The Kampala Northern Bypass Highway, which was opened in October 2009, ends in Busega where it joins the Entebbe-Kampala Highway, the dual-carriage toll expressway. The Northern Bypass Highway is also undergoing expansion into a dual carriageway.

== Landmarks ==
- Kampala Northern Bypass Highway, a 21 kilometres (13 mi) highway stretching from Nateete/Busega to the west, to Kireka/Bweyogerere to the east.
- Entebbe-Kampala Expressway, a dual carriage toll-highway that, when completed, will begin at Entebbe International Airport and join the Kampala Northern Bypass Highway at Busega
- Kampala–Masaka Road, a road from Kampala to Masaka coming off one of the roundabouts in Busega and continuing in a southwesterly direction, towards Kyengera, Mpigi, Kammengo, Buwama, Kayabwe/Nkozi, and Masaka
- Kampala–Mityana Road, the road to Mityana, coming off a second roundabout in Busega and turning in a westerly direction, towards Buloba, Bujuuko, Muduuma, Jjeza, Mityana, Mubende, and Fort Portal
- Old Mubende Road, the newly constructed tarmac road showcasing the new Busega Market, yet to be commissioned by the president of Uganda.

== See also ==
- Kajjansi
- Ndeeba
- Uganda Martyrs
