= Kisozi =

- Location in Uganda
- Coordinates: 00°04′16″N 31°35′58″E
- Country: Uganda
- Region: Central Uganda
- Sub-region: Mpigi sub-region
- District: Gomba District
- Elevation: 4,130 ft (1,260 m)

Kisozi is a settlement in the Gomba District in the Central Region of Uganda.

== Location ==
Kisozi is located approximately 37 kilometres (23 mi), by road, south-west of Kanoni, where the headquarters of the Gomba District are located. This is approximately 133 kilometres (83 mi), by road, south-west of Kampala, the capital and largest city of Uganda. The coordinates of the town are 0°04'16.0"N, 31°35'58.0"E (Latitude:0.071119; Longitude:31.599439).

== Points of interest ==
These points of interest lie within the town limits or near the edges of town:

- offices of Kisozi Town Council
- NEC Farm Katonga - A 26 square miles (17,000 acres) cattle ranch, a subsidiary of National Enterprise Corporation, the business arm of the Uganda People's Defence Force.
- Kizozi Ranch - A 3 square miles (1,900 acres) cattle ranch belonging to Yoweri Museveni, the president of Uganda (since 1986).
- Kisozi central market
- Katonga River - The town sits on the northern banks of the river.
- The Mpigi–Kabulasoke–Maddu–Sembabule Road passes immediately north of Kisozi as it continues to Sembabule, about 27 kilometres (17 mi) south-west of Kisozi.

== See also ==
- List of cities and towns in Uganda
- National Enterprise Corporation
