= Maddu =

- Map of Uganda showing location of Kijura
- Coordinates: 00°12′58″N 31°40′02″E
- Country: Uganda
- Region: Central Region of Uganda
- Sub-region: Buganda
- Districts: Gomba District
- Elevation: 1,199 m (3,934 ft)
- Time zone: UTC+3 (EAT)

Maddu is a town in Gomba District in the Central Region of Uganda.

== Location ==
The town is in Maddu sub-county, being one of the seven parishes in that administrative unit. The town is approximately 30 kilometres (19 mi), by road, northwest of Kanoni, the site of the district's headquarters. The town is approximately 128 kilometres (80 mi) west of Kampala, the capital and largest city of Uganda. The coordinates of Maddu are 0°12'58.0"N 31°40'02.0"E (Latitude:0.216111; Longitude:31.667222).

== Overview ==
The 135 kilometres (84 mi) Mpigi–Kabulasoke–Maddu–Sembabule Road passes through town.

Economic activities; Maddu is an agricultural community and Livestock forms the backbone of economic activity in the area. Milk and meat are important products produced by medium and small scale farmers in the area. In 2008, it was estimated that the sub-county produced more than 50,000 liters of milk daily.[4] The produce is sold locally in the popular Friday cattle markets and also marketed to Kampala, Uganda's capital and largest city about 135 kilometres (80 mi).

Prominent farms and ranches are located in areas of Kilasi (Katende Farm, Bitali family ranch), Kisozi YK Museveni farm and more towards Sembabule on one side, Buyanja and Kyayi on the other side.

The biggest challenges farmers face here are lack of modern model farms and processing plants, dry spells which lower productivity, long quarantines due to livestock diseases which makes sustainability of stock challenging due to increase production costs without income.

== See also ==
- Buganda
- Kabulasoke
- List of cities and towns in Uganda
