= Nabbingo =

- Location in Uganda
- Coordinates: 00°17′24″N 32°28′41″E
- Country: Uganda
- Region: Central Region
- District: Wakiso District
- Elevation: 3,865 ft (1,178 m)

Nabbingo is a hill in Wakiso District in the Buganda Region of Uganda. The hill rises 1,178 metres (3,865 ft) above sea level. The name "Nabbingo", also applies to the village that occupies the hill and the schools and churches that are located there.

== Location ==
Nabbingo is one of the villages in Nabbingo Parish, Nsangi sub-county, in Busiro County, in Wakiso District. Nabbingo is located along the Kampala–Masaka Road, approximately 14 kilometres (9 mi), south-west of Kampala, Uganda's capital and largest city. The geographical coordinates of Nabbingo are: 0°17'24.0"N, 32°28'41.0"E (Latitude:0.290000; Longitude:32.478056).

== Points of interest ==
The most prominent points of interest in Nabbingo are the Roman Catholic Church at the Top of the hill and Trinity College Nabbingo, established by the White Fathers in 1942. The Nabbingo Catholic Parish Church is administered under the Roman Catholic Archdiocese of Kampala.

Closer to the Masaka Highway, there are a couple of Pentecostal churches, an internet cafe, a hardware store and a couple of motels.

== See also ==
- Nsangi
- Buddo
- Kyengera
