= Kisoga, Gomba =

- Map of Uganda showing the location of Kisoga, Gomba
- Coordinates: 00°11′55″N 31°57′01″E
- Country: Uganda
- Region: Central Uganda
- District: Gomba District
- Elevation: 1,199 m (3,934 ft)
- Time zone: UTC+3 (EAT)

Kisoga is a settlement in Central Uganda. It is a suburb of the town of Kanoni, the administrative, commercial and political headquarters of Gomba District.

== Location ==
Kisoga is situated approximately 9 kilometres (6 mi), northeast of Kanoni, the location of the district headquarters. This location is approximately 96 kilometres (60 mi), by road, west of Kampala, the capital of Uganda and the largest city in that country. The coordinates of Kisoga, Gomba are:0°11'55.0"N, 31°57'01.0"E (Latitude:0.198611; Longitude:31.950278).

== See also ==
- Gomba District
- Butambala District
- Sembabule District
- The Equator
- Central Uganda
- Ugandan Towns
