= Aisha Kabanda =

Ugandan politician

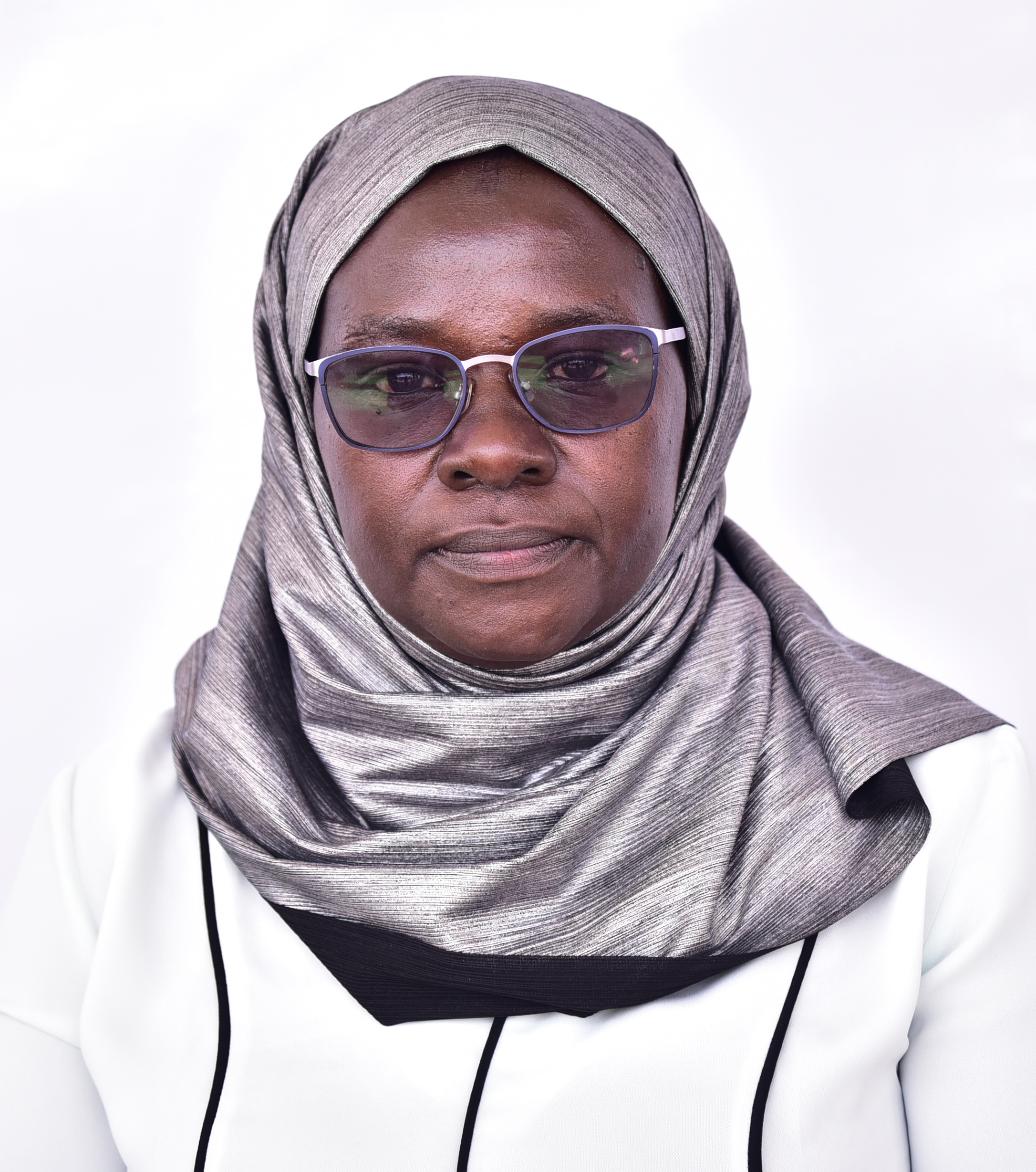
- Other name: Nalule Asha Aisha kabanda
- Citizenship: Ugandan
- Political party: National Unity Platform
- Spouse: Omar Kalinge-Nnyago
- Children: Ten

Nalule Asha Aisha Kabanda is a Ugandan politician and the Women's Representative in parliament for Butambala from 2021 to 2026. She was defeated in the 2026 general elections by Lydia Daphine Mirembe who ran on an independent ticket.

== Personal detail ==
Aisha Kabanda is married to Omar Kalinge-Nnyago, a research and learning manager for Uganda's Wasafiri consulting firm. The couple have 10 children.

== Political career ==
Aisha Kabanda started her work as a Kampala Resident City Commissioner in 2014. She resigned and ran for Butambala District Women's Representative in 2021. She holds the position of deputy secretary general for the National Unity Platform. She served as the Woman Representative for Butambala District from 2021 to 2026.

== See also ==
- National Unity Platform
- List of members of the eleventh Parliament of Uganda
- Muwanga Kivumbi
