= Hadija Namale =

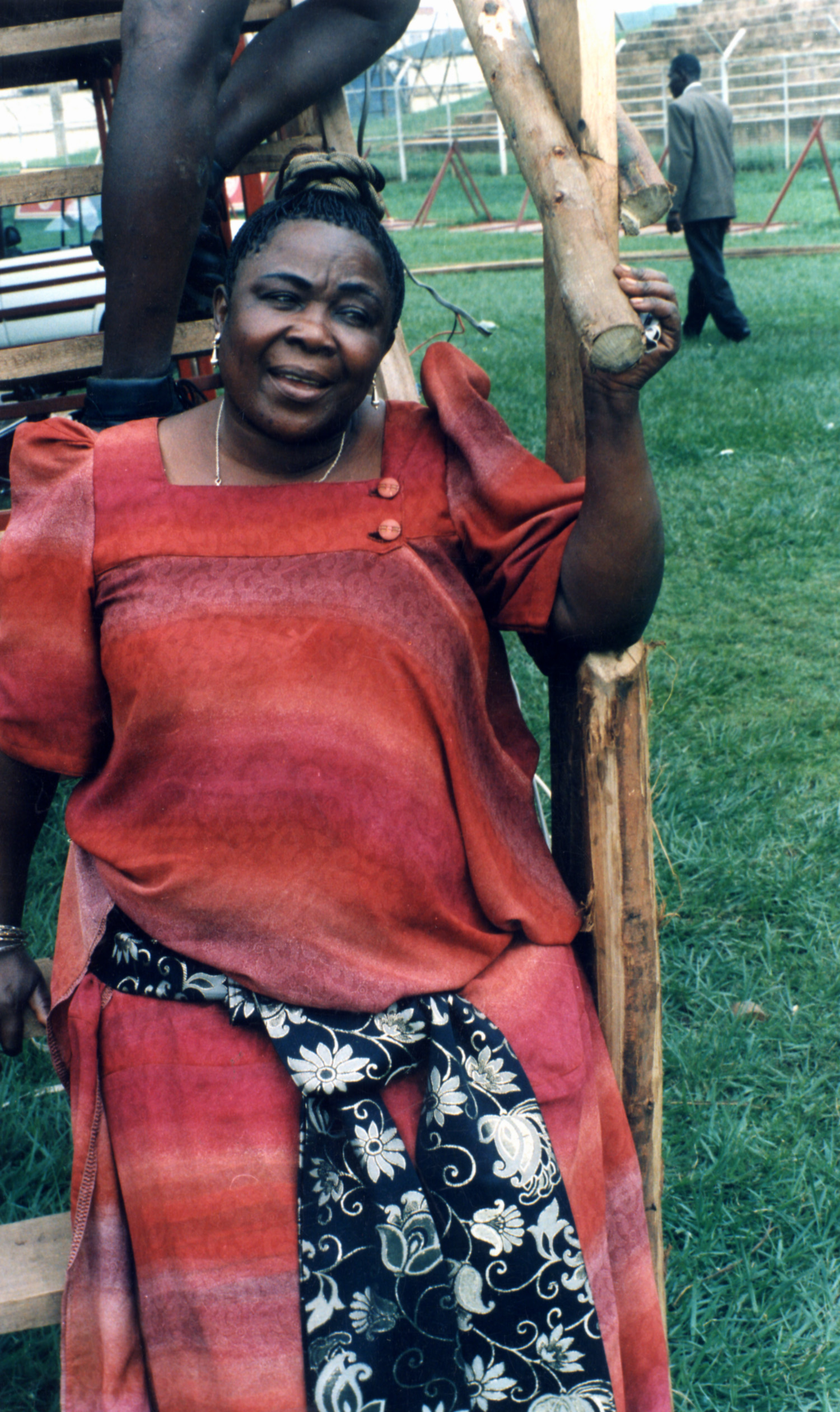

Background information
- Born: 1947 (age 78–79); Mitala Maria, Buwama Sub-county, Mpigi District, Uganda
- Origin: Uganda
- Genres: Congolese rumba
- Occupations: Singer, composer, guitarist, conga drums player
- Years active: 1960s–2000s

Hadija Namale also known as Hadijah Kiryango Namale (born in 1947) is a Ugandan musician. She rose to fame in the 1960s and 1970s.

== Early life ==
Namale was born at Mitala Maria in Buwama Sub-county, Mpigi District. When she was 13 years old, she entered a polygamous marriage but later separated from her husband. Her brother, Yusuf Kigambe, who owned disco equipment in their village, introduced her to music.

== Musical career ==
Namale’s professional music career began in the early 1960s. She first performed in Bunia, then part of Zaire (now the Democratic Republic of Congo), alongside her brother Samuel Kayongo. In 1966 she returned to Kampala and sang at the White Nile Bar in Katwe. She later joined the Suzana Band as a backup singer at Suzana Night Club in Nakulabye, under the direction of Eclas Kawalya.

Over the next two decades she recorded at Kericho Studios in Kenya, working with Top Ten Band and Rwenzori Band and collaborating with musicians such as Fred Kigozi and Frank Mbalire Kateeteeyi. Her singles included “Bbosa,” “Eriza,” “Zoozo,” “John,” “Mukulike Omwaka,” and “Nakiryowa.”

According to contemporary reports, “Zoozo” sold over 100,000 copies. “Mukulike Omwaka,” released as a New Year song, is frequently played on Ugandan radio during the festive season.

== Later life and legacy ==
In the 1980s Namale stepped back from mainstream performance to focus on farming, herbal medicine, hairdressing, and offering marriage counselling in Buwama Town, Mawokota County, Mpigi District. She occasionally performed at special functions such as weddings.

Her only child, Jamilah Nansubuga, trained under her in music and traditional dance. Journalist Michael J. Ssali described Namale as one of the most popular female artists of the 1970s.

== Discography ==
List of songs by Hadija Namale:

- Mukulike Omwaka
- Zoozo
- Bossa
- Kasujja
- John Mazima
- Tondekera Mukwano
- Nantege
- Herbert
- Kakande
- Night
- Sente Eteganya
- Hady
- Gwe Musanyusa
- Ekyama Ky'okufa
- Kikwabanga
- Nakilyowa
- Mulumba
- Omwana Gwe Nalonda
- Jida
- Golooba
- Okukola Kilungi
- Lawrence
- Lutalo
- Grace
- Gwolya Naye
- Okukyawa Munno
- Nkubulira
- Kakonje
- Saimon
- Johnny
- Siza
- Tunakola Tutya Emikwano

== See also ==
- Elly Wamala
- Philly Bongooley Lutaaya
