= Mariam Najjemba =

Ugandan politician (born 1972)

- Born: 8 April 1972 (age 54); Kanoni, Gomba District, Uganda
- Citizenship: Uganda
- Education: Makerere University (BA in Public Administration) (MA in Public Administration)
- Occupations: Administrator & Politician
- Years active: 1999–present
- Known for: Politics
- Title: Former State Minister for Urban Development

Mariam Najjemba Mbabaali, formerly known as Rosemary Najjemba Muyinda is a Ugandan politician. She served as the State Minister for Urban Planning in the Ugandan Cabinet from 15 August 2012, until 6 June 2016, when she was dropped from cabinet. In the cabinet, she replaced Justine Lumumba Kasule, who was appointed Government Chief Whip. Najjemba served as the elected Member of Parliament for Gomba County, Gomba District on the National Resistance Movement (NRM) political party ticket, for two consecutive terms, from 2006 until 2016.

== Early life and education ==
Najjemba was born in Gomba District on 4 August 1972. She attended Kitante Hill School for her O-Level education. She studied at MacKay College for her A-Level studies, graduating in 1993. She entered Makerere University in 1994, graduating in 1997 with the degree of Bachelor of Arts in Public Administration and Management. She also holds the degree of Master of Arts in the same field, obtained in 2004, also from Makerere University.

== Career ==
Beginning in 1999, until she joined active elective politics in 2006, Mariam Najjemba worked in various administrative roles in the Office of the President of Uganda, including as the head of the Women's Desk at State House Uganda and as the Presidential Assistant for Research at State House, Uganda. In 2006, she entered politics as a contestant for the Gomba County parliamentary seat, in what was then Mpigi District. She ran on the ticket of the National Resistance Movement (NRM) political party and won. In 2011, Gomba County was split off Mpigi District, forming Gomba District. She was re-elected in the renamed constituency and represented the new district in the 9th parliament (2011 to 2016). In a cabinet reshuffle on 15 August 2012, she was appointed State Minister for Urban Planning and Development.

In 2015, Najjemba announced that she was quitting Ugandan elective politics. She did not contest in the party primaries that year and did not defend her constituency in 2016. She was also dropped from cabinet in 2016.

== Personal life ==
Mariam Najjemba is married. She is of the Muslim faith.

== Other responsibilities ==
She carried the following additional responsibilities in parliament:

- She was the Chairperson of the Committee on HIV/AIDS and Related Matters
- She was a Member of the Committee on Natural Resources
- She was a Member of the Appointments Committee

== See also ==
- Districts of Uganda
- Mariam Nalubega
- Cabinet of Uganda
