= Trinity College Nabbingo =

Location
- Nabbingo, Wakiso District; Uganda; 0°17′28″N 32°28′40″E

Information
- Type: Public middle school and high school
- Motto: "Be True"
- Established: 1942; 84 years ago
- Faculty: 65
- Gender: Girls
- Enrollment: 1,010
- Athletics: Soccer, cricket, track, netball, volleyball, lawn tennis, table tennis, hockey
- Website: https://www.trinitycollegenabbingo.ac.ug/

Trinity College Nabbingo (TRICONA) is an all-girls boarding school covering grades 8–13 in Central Uganda.

== Location ==
The school is located on a hill in the village of Nabbingo, in Wakiso District, approximately 20 kilometres (12 mi), by road, south-west of Kampala, Uganda's capital and largest city, off of the Kampala-Masaka Road.

== History ==
TRICONA was founded in 1942 by the White Fathers, who are affiliated with the Roman Catholic Church. 36 years earlier, the same religious congregation had founded St. Mary's College Kisubi, a boys-only residential middle and high school along the Kampala-Entebbe Road. TRICONA was established, having realized that the secondary education of Catholic girls needed to be addressed as well. The objectives were to produce educated women who are "morally upright", "academically sound", "socially and physically capable" of serving God and their country. In the beginning, the school's administration was overseen by the Missionary Sisters of Our Lady of Africa (White Sisters), who later, in 1960 handed it over to the Canonesses Sisters of St. Augustine.

== Notable alumni ==
Notable women who have attended Trinity College Nabbingo include the following:

- Namirembe Bitamazire – former Minister of Education in Uganda, 2005–2011
- Syda Bbumba – former Minister of Gender and Social Issues in Uganda, 2011–2012
- Dominica Dipio – religious sister, filmmaker, author; professor of Literature and Film at Makerere University
- Joanita Kawalya – composer and vocalist with the Afrigo Band
- Laeticia Kikonyogo – deputy chief justice of Uganda, 2003–2010
- Jacqueline Mbabazi – educator and politician; wife of former prime minister Amama Mbabazi; chairperson of the National Resistance Movement Women's League
- Maria Musoke – information scientist and academic; first Ugandan woman to earn a PhD in Information Science; deputy vice chancellor in charge of Academic and Affairs at Kyambogo University, 2018–2023
- Hope Mwesigye – former Minister for Agriculture, Animal Industry and Fisheries in Uganda, 2009–2011
- Margaret Nakatudde Nsereko – educator and administrator; first Ugandan layperson to become headmistress at the school; served 1971–1987
- Mary Karoro Okurut – Cabinet Minister for General Duties in the Office of the Prime Minister, beginning in 2016; elected Woman Member of Parliament for Bushenyi District, 2005–2021
- Bernadette Olowo – first woman accepted as ambassador to the Holy See in over 900 years at her appointment in 1975
- Judith Tukahirwa – environmental scientist, water and sanitation consultant, and management executive; deputy executive director of the Kampala Capital City Authority

== See also ==
- Education in Uganda
- Roman Catholic Archdiocese of Kampala
- Roman Catholicism in Uganda
- St. Mary's College Kisubi
