= Tororo Wind Power Station =

Power station in Uganda

- Country: Uganda
- Location: Tororo, Tororo District
- Coordinates: 00°38′30″N 34°10′25″E
- Status: Reactivation of License
- Construction began: January 2022 Expected
- Commission date: December 2022
- Owner: Xsabo Wind Technologies Limited

Power generation
- Nameplate capacity: 20 MW (27,000 hp)

External links
- Website: www.xsabogroup.com

Tororo Wind Power Station (Xsabo Wind Technologies Limited) is a planned 20 MW (27,000 hp) wind-powered power station in the Eastern Region of Uganda.

== Location ==
The power station would be located approximately 8 kilometres (5 mi) by road outside the Eastern Region town of Tororo, on the road to Kampala, Uganda's capital and largest city. Tororo is approximately 210 kilometres (130 mi) to the east of Kampala.

== Overview ==
To help diversify Uganda's electricity sources, The Xsabo Group proposed to establish five wind parks in Uganda, with a maximum generation capacity of 100 MW (130,000 hp). This station would be the first to be developed.

In April 2015, the developers of this wind farm applied for an electricity generation license from the Electricity Regulatory Authority to set up the power station and sell the electricity to the Uganda Electricity Transmission Company Limited for integration into the national grid. In September 2015, a provisional generation license was granted. In February 2016, that license was modified, with the company having until March 2016 to post performance bonds and until June 2016 to reach financial close.

== Developers and funding ==
The Xsabo Group is the same entity that developed the Kabulasoke Solar Power Station and started construction of the Nkonge Solar Power Station (Xsabo Nkonge Solarline) with a capacity of 20MW on 31 March 2021 ahead of Xsabo Lira Solarline with a capacity of 50MW whose construction is planned to begin in January 2022. Together, these pilot solar and wind renewable energy installations amounted to investments of US$64 million (approximately UGX:214.272 billion), two-thirds of which will be borrowed.

== Timeline ==
Construction of The Xsabo Group’s Pilot Wind Power Park (20MW) was expected to begin in August 2016 and commissioning was expected in December 2016. Both will now be in 2022.

In February 2017, the Daily Monitor newspaper reported that the developers of the power station had failed to raise the required US$150,000 in performance guarantees and risked the cancellation of their generation licenses.

Dr David Alobo, Owner and CEO/Managing Director of The Xsabo Group, explained that failure to post the said bonds was not financial but evidently due to an omission by the Ugandan Government that is beyond his control. It turns out that the Generation and Sales License can be reinstalled after review of the relevant circumstances.

The Xsabo Group, the Owner of Xsabo Wind Technologies Limited, the Special Purpose Vehicle (SPV) for Xsabo’s Wind Power projects, is now in the process of reactivating the Generation and Sales License in accordance with the Electricity Act 1999 of the Republic of Uganda which gives the Developer the requisite confidence.

== See also ==
- List of power stations in Uganda
