= Kabulasoke =

- Map of Uganda showing location of Kabulasoke
- Coordinates: 00°09′27″N 31°48′42″E
- Country: Uganda
- Region: Central Region
- Districts: Gomba District

Government
  - Member of Parliament: Mariam Najjemba
- Elevation: 1,222 m (4,009 ft)
- Time zone: UTC+3 (EAT)

Kabulasoke is a town in Gomba District in the Central Region of Uganda.

== Location ==
The town is in Kabulasoke Sub-county, being one of the nine parishes in that administrative unit. Kabulasoke is approximately 15 kilometres (9 mi), by road, west of Kanoni, the location of the district headquarters. This is approximately 22 kilometres (14 mi) southeast of Maddu, the nearest large town.

Kabulasoke is approximately 112 kilometres (70 mi), by road, southwest of Kampala, the capital and largest city of Uganda. The coordinates of Kabulasoke are 0°09'25.0"N, 31°48'42.0"E (Latitude:0.156944; Longitude:31.811667). The average elevation of the town is about 1,222 metres (4,009 ft) above mean sea level.

== Overview ==
In April 2015, MSS Xsabo Power Limited applied for a license to generate 20 megawatts of solar power from the then proposed Kabulasoke Solar Power Station, located in Namulasa Village, Butiti Parish, Kabulasoke Sub-County, Gomba District. The project was completed in December 2018, launching the start of a 20-year Power Purchase Agreement with the Government of the Republic of Uganda. The plant will serve power to 5 million people in rural Uganda.

The 135 kilometres (84 mi) Mpigi–Kabulasoke–Maddu–Sembabule Road passes through town. The town is also the location of Kabulasoke CORE Primary Teachers' College.
