= Mirembe =

Mirembe is a surname. Notable people with the surname include:

- Abigaba Cuthbert Mirembe (born 1975), Ugandan politician and engineer
- Drake P Mirembe (fl. 2013), Ugandan computer scientist
- Doreen Mirembe (born 1987), Ugandan actress, filmmaker, producer
- Enid Mirembe (fl. 2014), Ugandan beauty pageant contestant
- Lydia Daphine Mirembe (born 1985), Ugandan politician
