= Mariam Nalubega =

Ugandan politician (born 1981)

- Born: 27 November 1981 (age 44); Uganda
- Citizenship: Uganda
- Education: St. Lawrence University (Bachelor of Public Administration and Management ) Law Development Center (Diploma in Law); St. Lawrence University (Bachelor of Arts in Public Administration)
- Occupation: Politician
- Years active: 2006 – present
- Known for: Politics
- Title: Member of Parliament; Parliament of Uganda
- Spouse: Single

Mariam Patience Nalubega (born 27 November 1981) is a Ugandan politician. She was the Woman Member of Parliament representing Butambala District in the 9th Parliament of Uganda. She was elected to that position in March 2011. Prior to that, from 2005 until 2011, she served as the National Female Youth Member of Parliament in Uganda.

== Background and education ==
She was born in Butambala District, Central Uganda, on 27 November 1981 to Saidi Lubega and Jalia Nakayange. She attended Makerere University Primary School, before she transferred to Butawuka Secondary School for her O-Level studies. She attended St. Francis Secondary School in Mengo, for her A-Level education. Nalubega holds the degree of Bachelor of Public Administration, obtained from St. Lawrence University, A Certificate of Public administration and Management - Makerere University. She also holds the Diploma in Law, obtained from the Law Development Centre in Kampala.

== Work experience ==
From 2001 until 2006, Mariam Nalubega was a Female Youth Councilor at Mpigi District Council, serving as the District Secretary for Health from 2003 until 2006. In 2006, she was elected as the National Female Youth Member of Parliament, serving in that position until 2011. During that period, she served on the parliamentary committee on the economy and on the Information and Communications Technology committee. In 2011, she was elected as the Woman District Member of Parliament, for the newly created Butambala District. Currently Nalubega is the Vice Chairperson of the Local Government Finance Commission appointedvby His Excellency the President for 4 years. She is Rotarisn PHF at the Rotary Club of Kamapal Central

== Other responsibilities ==
Mariam Nalubega is a single mother of four, she is a Rotarian, an entrepreneur a currently pursuing a post graduate Diploma in Public administration.

== See also ==
- Parliament of Uganda
- Mariam Najjemba
- Butambala District
