= Buwama =

- Location in Uganda; Placement on map is approximate
- Coordinates: 00°03′48″N 32°06′23″E
- Country: Uganda
- Region: Central Uganda
- District: Mpigi District
- Municipality: Buwama
- County: Mawokota
- Elevation: 3,888 ft (1,185 m)

Population (2024 Census)
  - Total: 31,774

Buwama is a town in the Buganda Region of Uganda.

== Location ==
Buwama is in Mpigi District on the Kampala–Masaka Road, approximately 32 kilometres (20 mi), by road, south-west of Mpigi, the location of the district headquarters. This is approximately 11 kilometres (7 mi), north-east of Kayabwe, the town to Buwama's immediate south, along the Masaka Highway. Buwama is about 71 kilometres (44 mi), by road, south-west of Kampala, Uganda's capital city.

The coordinates of Buwama are 0°03'48.0"N, 32°06'23.0"E (Latitude:0.063333; Longitude:32.106389). The town sits at an average elevation of 1,185 metres (3,888 ft) above sea level.

== Overview ==
Buwama is a growing urban centre along the Masaka Highway, just north of the Equator. The town is connected to the national electricity grid. The town has access to potable piped water following improvements between 2011 and 2017, funded with loans from the African Development Bank.

Other facilities available include three farmers markets, a soccer stadium (Archbishop Kasujja Stadium), a police station and a magistrate's court. Also present are two petrol stations, a radio station (103.3 Buwama FM) and a number of schools. Buwama Health Centre III, a public healthcare facility offers healthcare services to the public.

== Population ==
The population of Buwama was estimated at 16,000 people, as of June 2017.

== Challenges ==
As of June 2017, the town had two major changes. The first was the town's inability to dispose of garbage in a sustainable, healthy, environmentally friendly manner. The other challenge was high level of homicide, with twenty murders in the two years prio to that.

== See also ==
- List of cities and towns in Uganda
