= Kampala Flyover Road Project =

Road in Kampala, Uganda

Coordinates: 00°18′26″N 32°34′44″E

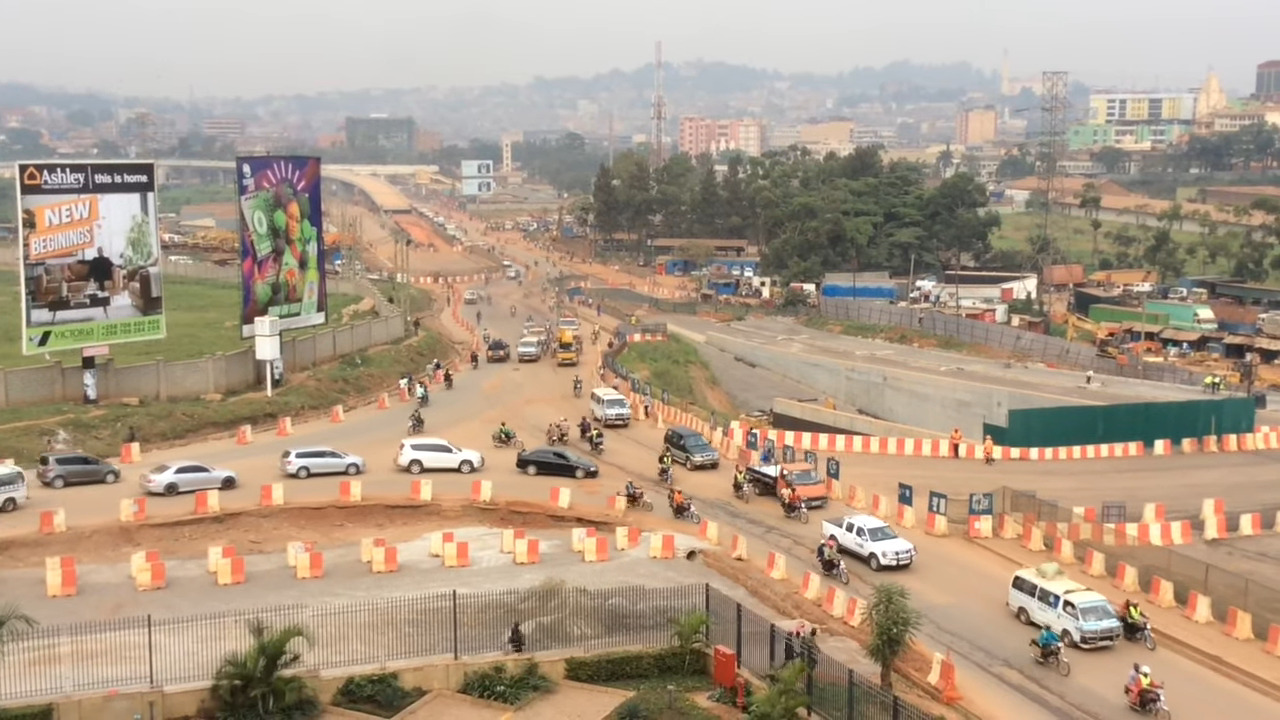
- Worksite at Mukwano Road and Nsambya Road interchange, January 2023

Route information
- Length: 2.18 mi (3.51 km)
- History: Designated in 2018; Completed in 2020

Major junctions
- West end: Queen's Way, Kampala
- East end: Wampewo Avenue, Kampala

Location
- Country: Uganda

Highway system
- Roads in Uganda

The Kampala Flyover Road Project, also Kampala Flyover Project, is a road-improvement project in the Central Division of Kampala, the capital city of Uganda and the largest city in that East African country.

== Location ==
The project involves the construction of flyovers at the "Clock Tower", and at "Kitgum House", the widening of Nsambya Road and of Mukwano Road, including the improvements of interfacing roads and junctions. The project stretches over an estimated 3.5 kilometres (2 mi).

== Overview ==
This road project is intended to decongest the city by separating through-traffic from the city-street-traffic. This project focuses on traffic entering the city, mainly from Entebbe along the old Kampala-Entebbe Road and from Mpigi, along the Kampala-Mpigi Expressway. Traffic from these routes, destined to Lugogo, Nakawa and points along the Kampala-Jinja Highway will find this new route faster and more user-friendly, reducing travel times and leading to less carbon emissions from exhaust fumes in stalled traffic on the city streets. Also, by removing the pass-through traffic, off the city streets, the congestion will be lessened.

== Background ==
In an attempt to reduce gridlock within the city of Kampala, the Japan International Cooperation Agency (JICA) commissioned a study in 2010 which was updated in 2013 and 2014 to examine available options for alleviating chronic traffic jams in the Greater Kampala Metropolitan Area.

The Government of Uganda accepted the recommendation of the study and through the Uganda National Roads Authority (UNRA), engaged Nippon Koei in a joint venture with Eighth Japan Engineering Company (EJEC) and Infra Consulting Services Limited (ICS) to carry out the detailed design and tender assistance of the Kampala Flyover Project. The project (Jinja Road – Mukwano Road – Queen's Way) is funded by the Ugandan government, with financing from JICA.

== Construction ==
The first phase of this project is expected to begin in 2018, once a contractor has been selected. The work is budgeted at US$148 to US$200 million (depending on sources), borrowed from the Government of Japan, through the Japan International Cooperation Agency.

On 19 December 2018, construction of this project was flagged off by Yoweri Museveni, Uganda's president. The first phase is budgeted at USh300 billion (US$82 million).

== See also ==
- List of roads in Uganda
- Transport in Uganda
