= Mpigi General Hospital =

- Uganda Ministry of Health

Geography
- Location: Mpigi, Mpigi District, Central Uganda, Uganda
- Coordinates: 00°13′30″N 32°19′19″E

Organisation
- Care system: Public
- Type: General

Services
- Emergency department: I
- Beds: 100

History
- Founded: 2011

Links
- Other links: Hospitals in Uganda

Mpigi General Hospital, also Mpigi Hospital, is a hospital in the Central Region of Uganda.

== Location ==
The hospital is located in the town of Mpigi, in Mpigi District, approximately 38 kilometres (24 mi), by road, southwest of Mulago National Referral Hospital. The coordinates of the hospital are:0°13'30.0"N 32°19'19.0"E (Latitude:0.225004; Longitude:32.321944).

== Overview ==
The hospital serves as the district hospital for Mpigi District. It has a bed capacity of 100 beds. As of April 2012, the hospital had one medical officer, assisted by a number of clinical officers, nurses and midwives. The major health conditions attended o included obstetric cases and complications, HIV/AIDS related morbidity, childhood fevers and respiratory infections among children and adults. The area Member of Parliament, is Amelia Kyambadde, who also serves as the Minister of Trade and Industry. She has been actively involved in the establishment of the hospital.

== History ==
Mpigi Hospital was established in July 2012, when the existing Health Center IV was elevated to hospital status. The creation of the hospital followed lobbying by the area MP, Amelia Kyambadde. She has continued to support the new hospital by donating equipment, either directly or through her area NGO; Twezimbe Development Foundation.

== See also ==
- List of hospitals in Uganda
