= Muwanga Kivumbi =

Ugandan politician

Muhammad Muwanga Kivumbi
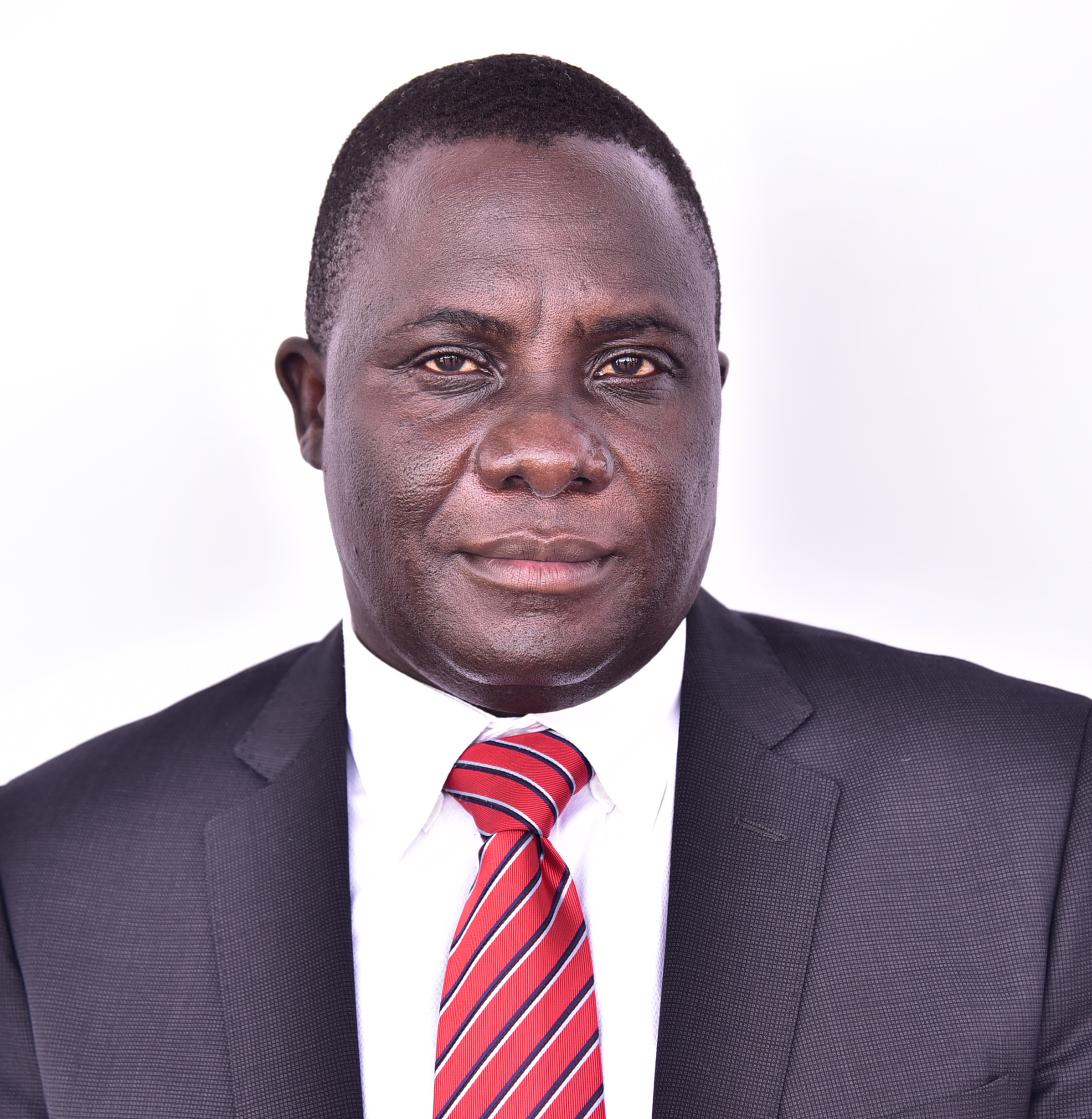

Member of Parliament of Uganda for Butambala County
- In office May 2021 – May 2026
- Succeeded by: Eriasa Mukiibi Sserunjogi

Chairperson of the Public Accounts Committee (PAC - Central Government)
- In office January 2024 – May 2026
- Preceded by: Medard Lubega Sseggona

Chairperson of the Buganda Parliamentary Caucus
- In office 2021 – May 2026

Deputy President for the Central Region of the National Unity Platform
- Incumbent
- Assumed office 16 January 2025
- Leader: Robert Kyagulanyi Ssentamu

Personal details
- Born: Muhammad Muwanga Kivumbi; October 19, 1973 (age 52) Butambala District, Central Uganda
- Citizenship: Ugandan
- Party: National Unity Platform (2021–present); Democratic Party (before 2021)
- Education: Makerere University (BA); Uganda Martyrs University; Uganda Management Institute (MA)
- Profession: Economist, politician

Muwanga Muhammad Kivumbi (born 19 October 1973) is a Ugandan economist, politician and former Member of Parliament of Uganda for Butambala District. He served as chairperson of the 11th parliament's Public Accounts Committee (PAC-Central government) and also doubled as the head of the Buganda parliamentary caucus.

== Early life and education ==
Kivumbi was born on 19 October 1973 in Butambala District, Central Uganda. He earned his First School Leaving Certificate from Gombe Primary School in 1986 and obtained Uganda Certificate of Education (UCE) from Kibuli Secondary School in 1990. He studied for his Uganda Advanced Certificate of Education (UACE) from 1990 to 1993 before enrolling in Makerere University where graduated with bachelor degree in Economics in 1998. In 2003, he earned an Associate Degree in Democracy and Development from Uganda Martyrs University and a Master of Human Resource Management from Uganda Management Institute (UMI) in 2004.

== Political career ==
Kivumbi was a member of Democratic Party (DP) before joining National Unity Platform (NUP) party in 2021. He was elected the Chairperson of Buganda parliamentary caucus in the 11th parliament. On January 16, 2025, he was appointed as the Deputy president for the central region for the National Unity Platform. He was voted out of parliament during the hotly contested 2026 general elections.

On the night of the 2026 Ugandan general election on 15–16 January, seven people were shot dead by unidentified security personnel outside Kivumbi's residence in Butambala. On 22 January, Kivumbi was arrested on charges relating to the incident.

Kivumbi was arrested again in Mpigi on Friday July 10, 2026 shortly after being granted bail by the International Crimes Division of the High Court. As of 23 July, Kivumbi has not been heard from, and Ugandan authorities have not confirmed his detention or his whereabouts. On 29 July, authorities charged Kivumbi with "inciting violence" and "managing an unlawful society".

== See also ==
Aisha Kabanda

List of Members in the Eleventh Parliament of Uganda
