= Kabulasoke Solar Power Station =

Solar power plant in Uganda

- Country: Uganda
- Location: Kabulasoke, Gomba District
- Coordinates: 00°08′58″N 31°49′13″E
- Status: Operational
- Construction began: May 2018
- Commission date: December 2018
- Owner: The Xsabo Group
- Operator: Xsabo Power Limited

Solar farm
- Type: Flat-panel PV

Power generation
- Nameplate capacity: 20 MW (27,000 hp)

External links
- Website: www.xsabogroup.com

The Xsabo Group's pilot solar power plant in Kabulasoke, also known as Kabulasole Solar Power Station or Namulaba Solar Power Station, is a 20 MW (27,000 hp) solar power plant in Uganda.

== Location ==
The power station is in the Namulaba Village, Butiti Parish, Kabulasoke sub-county, Gomba District, outside of the town of Kabulasoke and off of the Mpigi–Kabulasoke–Maddu–Sembabule Road. The station is approximately 73 kilometres (45 mi), by road, west of Mpigi, the nearest large town. This location is approximately 111 kilometres (69 mi), by road, southwest of Kampala, Uganda's capital and largest city. The development sits on 280 acres (110 ha) of real estate, with the solar park itself taking 90 acres.

== Overview ==
To help diversify the national energy pool for Uganda, The Xsabo Group is developing five solar parks in various locations within the country, with total generation capacity of 150 MW (200,000 hp). The Kabulasoke solar power plant is the first to be developed by the company, thus the name “Pilot Solar Power Park Kabulasoke” as stated in its license.

In September 2015, Xsabo Power received a provisional generation licence, which was modified in February 2016. Under the new terms, the company had until March 2016 to post performance bonds and up until June 2016 to conclude financing arrangements.

== Developers and funding ==
Owned by The Xsabo Group, which is in turn owned by Dr. David Alobo, a Ugandan resident in Germany who is CEO/Managing Director of Xsabo Power Limited and of The Xsabo Group as a whole, the pilot solar power plant in Kabulasoke was developed by Xsabo Power Limited as the corresponding special purpose vehicle of The Xsabo Group, the same entity that is developing the 20 megawatts Nkonge Solar Power Station, in Mubende District, whose commissioning is expected on 31 March 2023 ahead of the anticipated commissioning of the Xsabo Lira Solarline in Northern Uganda, a unique trendsetting public private partnership with the Local Provincial Government, with a capacity of 50MW, on 31 December 2024.

== Timeline ==
Construction was planned to begin in August 2016 and commissioning was planned for December 2016.

Due to unexpected delays, laying of the solar panels only began in September 2018, with Uganda's Vice President Edward Kiwanuka Ssekandi laying the first module. Commercial and technical commissioning took place on 30 December 2018.

President Yoweri Kaguta Museveni of Uganda ceremonially commissioned the power station on 9 January 2019 in the presence of Uganda's Vice President Edward Kiwanuka Ssekandi, the Patron of The Xsabo Group's 150MW Solar project, as well as Engineer Simon D'Ujanga, the State Minister for Energy, Lt. Gen. Charles Angina, former Deputy Chief of Defence Forces of the Republic of Uganda and now Deputy Chief Coordinator of the Presidential Initiative “Operation Wealth Creation,” and Richard S. Apire, Chairman of the Electricity Regulatory Authority (ERA) among other dignitaries.

== See also ==
- List of power stations in Uganda
