= Jezza, Uganda =

Jezza
- Village
- Location within Uganda
- Coordinates: 00°22′30″N 32°16′06″E
- Country: Uganda
- Region: Central Region
- District: Mpigi District

Population (2014)
  - Total: 4,233

Jezza (also spelt Jjeza) is a village situated in the Mpigi District of Uganda, just outside of the capital city Kampala. The village is served by the A109 highway.

== History ==
Jezza is shown on a 1904 map of Uganda as 'Jeza'

== Activities ==
The Jezza Market, which is a street market, is the main area of commerce within the town. The village features a local pub, the New Life Pub, and a church, the Jjeza Holiness Church & Orphanage Home.

== Education ==
Located within Jezza is the Jezza Day & Boarding Primary School. The school is a co-ed, government owned and funded primary school. There were 379 students enrolled at the school in 2018. Also within Jezza is the privately operated Jezza Preparatory Primary School, which had an enrollment of 200 students in 2018. The schools serve both Jezza and villages in the surrounding area.

== In the media ==
The village gained notoriety when visited by popular BBC television show Top Gear during the filming of the two-part Africa Special. The show visited the village because its name is the same as the nickname of presenter Jeremy Clarkson.
