= Jessica Alupo =

Ugandan politician (born 1974)

Her Excellency Jessica Alupo
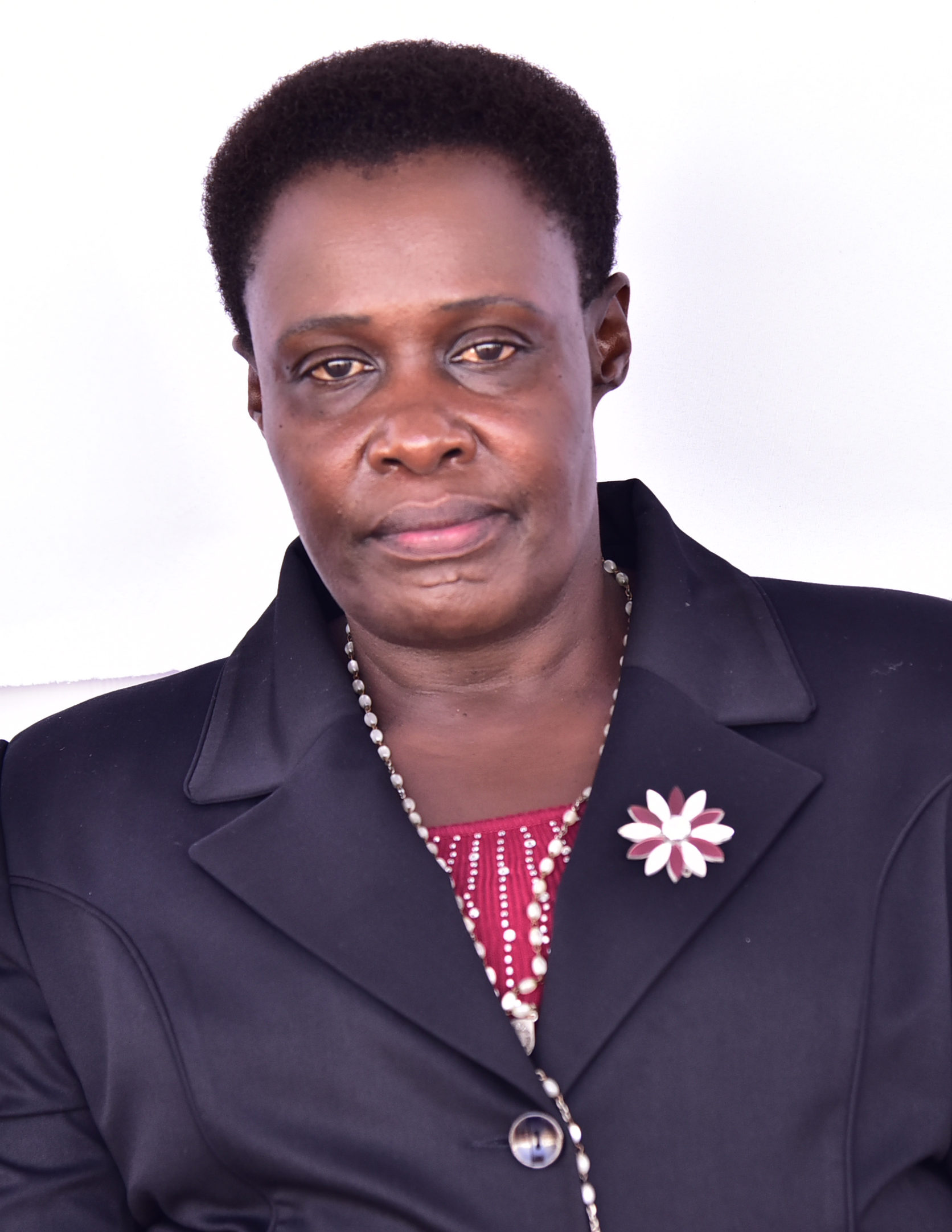
- Alupo in 2021

Vice President of Uganda
- Incumbent
- Assumed office 21 June 2021
- President: Yoweri Museveni
- Prime Minister: Robinah Nabbanja
- Preceded by: Edward Ssekandi

Minister of Education and Sports
- In office 27 May 2011 – 6 June 2016
- President: Yoweri Museveni
- Prime Minister: Amama Mbabazi; Ruhakana Rugunda
- Preceded by: Namirembe Bitamazire
- Succeeded by: Janet Museveni

State Minister for Youth and Children Affairs
- In office 2009 – 27 May 2011
- President: Yoweri Museveni
- Prime Minister: Apolo Nsibambi; Amama Mbabazi

Member of the Parliament of Uganda
- Incumbent
- Assumed office 2001
- Constituency: Katakwi

Personal details
- Born: 23 May 1974 (age 52) Katakwi, Uganda
- Party: National Resistance Movement
- Spouse: Major Innocent Tukashaba
- Education: Makerere University (BA in political science) (MA in international relations); Uganda Management Institute (Diploma in public administration and management) (MA in public administration and management)

Jessica Rose Epel Alupo (born 23 May 1974) commonly known as Jessica Alupo, is a Ugandan politician who has been in the ninth parliament and is the current vice president of Uganda since 2021. She is an educator and a former military officer. She previously served in the cabinet of Uganda as minister of education between the year 2011 and 2016. She is also an elected member of parliament as Katakwi District's women's representative in the 12th Parliament of Uganda.

== Early life and education ==
Jessica Alupo was born in Katakwi District on 23 May on the year 1974. She attended Apuuton Primary School. She then attended Kangole Girls School for her O-Level studies. For her A-Level education, she studied at Ngora High School. Alupo trained as a high school canteen attendant before she underwent the officer cadet course at the Uganda Junior Staff College in Jinja. She holds a Bachelor of Arts in political science and linguistics, obtained in 1997 from Makerere University. Her first master's degree of Arts in international relations and diplomacy, was also obtained from Makerere University in 2008. She also holds a diploma in public administration and management, obtained in 2008 from the Uganda Management Institute (UMI). Her second master's degree is Master's in public administration and management, obtained in 2009, also from Makerere University.

== Career ==
Over the years, Jessica has been employed in various capacities, including:

- As a headteacher at the Katakwi Primary School in the town of Katakwi, Katakwi District, Eastern Region of Uganda
- As an instructor at the Uganda Urban Warfare Training School, Singo, Nakaseke District, Central Region of Uganda
- As an intelligence officer at the Chieftaincy of Military Intelligence in Kampala, Uganda's capital city.

In 2001, she entered politics as a candidate for the Katakwi District women's representative. She ran on the ticket of the National Resistance Movement (NRM) political party. She won and was re-elected in 2006. In 2009, she was appointed as the state minister for youth and children's affairs. In 2011, she was re-elected to her parliamentary constituency. In the cabinet reshuffle of 27 May 2011, she was promoted to the post of Minister of Education and Sports. She replaced Namirembe Bitamazire, who was dropped from the cabinet.

== Personal life ==
Alupo is married to Innocent Tukashaba. She is reported to enjoy reading, community mobilization, and travel.
