= Muduuma =

- Map of Uganda showing the location of Muduuma
- Coordinates: 00°20′48″N 32°18′28″E
- Country: Uganda
- Region: Central Uganda
- District: Mpigi District
- Constituency: Mawokota County North

Government
  - Member of Parliament: Amelia Kyambadde
- Time zone: UTC+3 (EAT)

Muduuma is a town in central Uganda. It is one of the urban centers in Mpigi District.

== Location ==
The town is situated along the Kampala–Mityana Road, approximately 40 kilometres (25 mi), west of Kampala, Uganda's capital and largest city. The coordinates of Muduuma are: 0°20'48.0"N, 32°18'28.0"E (Latitude:0.346680; Longitude:32.307766).

== Overview ==
Muduuma is a small urban centre, surrounded by a rural agricultural community.

The Catholic church, Our Lady Queen of Martyrs was established in 1962 and consecrated on 24th April 2022 by Archbishop Paul Ssemogerere. The parish priest is Reverend Father Joseph Mary Kato.

The village war memorial commemorates the soldiers who died in the Ugandan Bush War in Muduuma. The stone was laid by Hon Samson Kissekka on 21st January 1995.

== Points of interest ==
The following points of interest lie within the town limits or close to the edges of town:

- The offices of Muduuma Town Council
- Muduuma Central Market
- Muduuma Health Centre III
- Headquarters of Muduuma sub-county
- Our Lady Queen of Martyrs Church
- Muduuma War Memorial
