= Kampala–Mityana Road =

Road in Uganda

Coordinates: 00°22′38″N 32°09′20″E

Route information
- Length: 37 mi (60 km)
- History: Designated in 2008; Completion in 2012

Major junctions
- East end: Busega
- Buloba; Bujuuko; Zigoti
- West end: Mityana

Location
- Country: Uganda

Highway system
- Roads in Uganda

The Kampala–Mityana Road is a road in the Central Region of Uganda, connecting the capital city of Kampala to the town of Mityana in Mityana District.

== Location ==
The road begins in the Busega neighborhood, in Lubaga Division, northwestern Kampala. It continues through Buloba, Bujuuko, and Zigoti, to end at Masaka, a distance of approximately 60 kilometres (37 mi).

== Overview ==
Prior to 2009, the road was gravel surfaced, in poor condition. As far back as 2003, the government of Uganda planned to upgrade the road surface.

== Upgrade to bitumen surface ==
In 2009, work to upgrade the road surface to grade II bitumen class, with shoulders, culverts and drainage channels. The road was divided into two sections: (a) Busega–Muduuma, measuring 27 kilometres (17 mi), was contracted to Spencon Services Limited with Stirling Civil Engineering Limited (b) Muduuma–Mityana, measuring 30 kilometres (19 mi), was contracted to Dott Services Limited. Lea International Limited (Canada) was the supervising contractor for both sections. The road was successfully completed in 2012.

== See also ==
- List of roads in Uganda
