= School dropouts in Uganda =

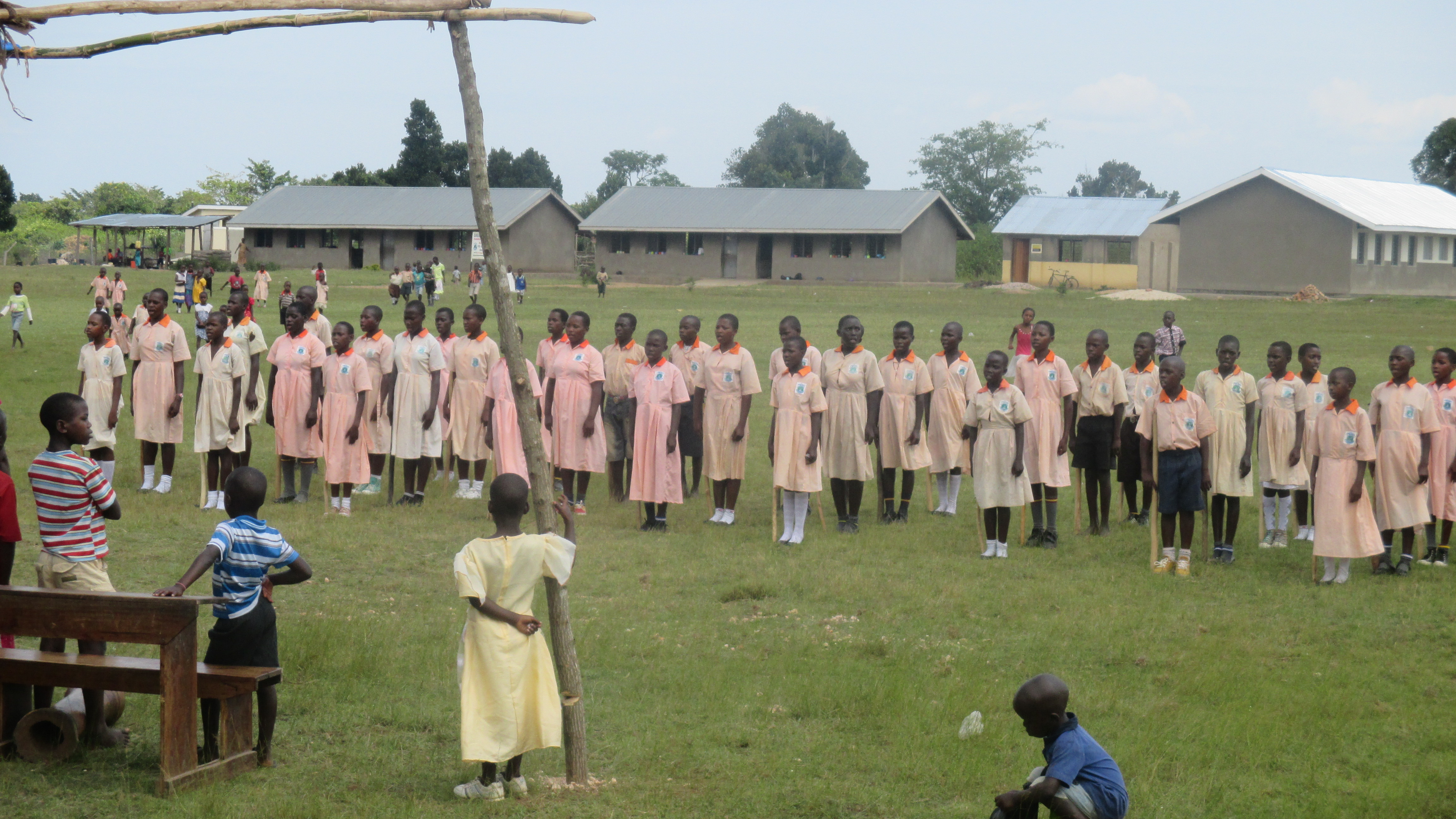
Green Valley Kasanje Primary school

School Dropout In Uganda has increased over the years, with primary schools standing at 45%. School attendance for both boys and girls in Uganda between 2013 and 2018 declined by 20% which affected educational performance outputs countrywide. After COVID-19 Pandemic, school dropout rates went high thereby challenging the education sector in Uganda.

== Research ==
Makerere University, an established leaning institution in Uganda conducted a research within the context of child school dropout and analysed a number of outcomes. The study revealed ke influencing factors that include teacher-student relations and school related factors contributing to school dropouts of children at primary school level.

== National school enrolment ==
In Uganda, under the Universal Primary Education (UPE), and Universal Secondary Education (USE) program, Ministry of Education and sports in Uganda has updated national enrolment and general performance statistics for both Universal Primary Education (UPE), and Universal Secondary Education (UPE). Private schools in Uganda have consistent student numbers compared to government schools especially in rural areas where pupils engage in several activities like farming, fetching water among others before reporting to school. This has also affected the learning outcomes of students in rural areas in Uganda.

== See also ==
- Education in Uganda
- Ministry of Education and Sports (Uganda)
