= Tororo Power Station =

Tororo Power Station may referrer to one of the following:

- Tororo Thermal Power Station, an operational 70 megawatt fossil fuel power plant
- Tororo Solar Power Station, an operational 10 megawatts solar power plant
- Tororo Wind Power Station, a proposed 20 megawatt wind-powered power plant
- Osukuru Thermal Power Station, a planned 12 megawatt chemical-powered plant, located 8 kilometres (5 mi), outside Tororo town center.
