= Kisoga (disambiguation) =

Kisoga has several meanings, including:

- Kisoga, Mukono, a town located in Mukono District, Central Uganda
- Kisoga, Gomba, a settlement located in Gomba District, Uganda
- In the Lusoga language, anything related to Busoga.
