= Nick Nola =

Ugandan singer (born 1985)

- Also known as: Nicky Nola
- Born: Nicholas Tatambuka; July 1985 (age 41)
- Origin: Kampala, Uganda
- Genres: R&B
- Occupations: Singer, songwriter, dancer
- Instrument: Vocals
- Years active: 2004–present
- Labels: UGPulse (current); Platinum Records (former)
- Website: Nick Nola

Nicholas Tatambuka (born July 1985), better known by his stage names Nick Nola and Nicky Nola, is a Ugandan R&B singer-songwriter and dancer who came to prominence as a member of the musical group Hip Hop Canvas. Signed to Platinum Records, the group first arrived on the music scene in 2005 with their single "Mother Africa", which won Best Hip Hop Single. In 2010, Nola was included in Ladybrille's list of the "15 African Breakout Artists of The Year". In 2013, HiPipo 5Star rated him the 34th most popular artist in the whole of East Africa.

== Early life and music career ==
Nola's interest in music developed at a young age. He started singing at elementary school emulating his favorite artists like Usher, New Edition and Boyz II Men. In high school, he competed in the All Kampala Original Song Competition at Cine Afrik, and won first place. By the time he graduated Kitante Hill School, he had begun gaining the attention of record labels around East Africa. In 2004, Shadrack, managing director of Platinum Records, discovered Nola and signed him to his music label.

Nola became a member of a group called the Hip Hop Canvas, which included GNL, Lyrical G and Qute Kaye. The group's debut studio album contained 14 tracks. Nola appeared on songs including "First Love", "Sitakiwewe", "Hip Hop Party" and "Mother Africa". The following year, Hip Hop Canvas received the Best Hip Hop Single award for "Mother Africa", and partnered with Jungle Beat to record "Yegwe", "Nkaaba" and "Down Low" alongside Mosh. The group also released the single "Brand New Day".

In 2009, Nola landed a contract to be managed and endorsed by UGPulse. He subsequently began working on his debut studio album Honey Moon, an international music project featuring producers Swangz Avenue, GoodEnuf, Allan, Washington, Henry Kiwuwa and Young Pulse. The album was originally set to hit store shelves in late 2011. Nola released the singles "I Love The Way" and "Marianna", which became popular in Uganda and abroad. On 24 December 2010, Ladybrille Magazine ranked him number 15 on their list of the "15 African Breakout Artists of the Year".

== Music projects ==
In 2012, it was announced that Nola was working with Nigerian singer Slim Burna on a remix of his song "Oya Na" that would appear on the Honey Moon project. The remix was produced by Washington, and mixed and mastered by Lurssen Mastering in the U.S. On 23 May 2013, a brief 90-second snippet of the song premiered exclusively online via DStv.

== Discography ==
=== Studio albums ===
- Honey Moon (to be released)

=== Music videos ===
==== 2010 ====
- "Marianna"
- "I Love The Way" (featuring Bella)
- "Sembera"
- "Aliwa"

==== 2012 ====
- "Mufunye"

== Awards and nominations ==
=== Zzina Awards ===
Year	Nominee / work	Award	Result	Ref
2015	"Maama"	Inspirational Song of the Year	Nominated	

== See also ==
- List of Ugandan musicians
- Music of Uganda
