= List of regions of Uganda by Human Development Index =

This is a list of regions of Uganda by Human Development Index as of 2022.

Rank	Region	HDI (2022)
Medium human development
1	Kampala	0.663
2	Central South	0.609
3	Central North	0.562
4	East Central (Busoga)	0.551
–	Uganda (average)	0.550
Low human development
5	Eastern (Bukedi, Bugisu, Teso)	0.549
6	Southwest (Ankole, Kigezi)	0.540
7	Western (Bunyoro, Toro)	0.519
8	West Nile sub-region	0.506
9	North (Karamoja, Lango, Acholi)	0.495

== See also ==
- List of East African Community sub regions by Human Development Index
- List of countries by Human Development Index
