= Uganda Ministry of Education Complex =

Headquarters of Uganda's ministry of education

- Location within Kampala

General information
- Type: Office
- Location: Kyambogo, Kampala, Uganda
- Coordinates: 00°21′28″N 32°37′38″E
- Construction started: October 2023
- Completed: Q2 2025 (Expected)
- Cost: US$16.9 million (USh63.9 billion)

Technical details
- Floor count: 10 and 8
- Floor area: 12,272 square metres (132,095 sq ft)

Design and construction
- Architect: Symbion Uganda

The Uganda Ministry of Education Complex, also Uganda Education Complex, is a building complex under construction in Uganda, that is intended to serve as the headquarters of the Uganda Ministry of Education and Sports (MoES).

== Location ==
The building complex is located in the Kyambogo neighborhood, in the Nakawa Division of Kampala, Uganda's capital and largest city. The building complex lies adjacent to Kyambogo Primary School.

This is approximately 10 kilometres (6 mi), by road, northeast the central business district of Kampala. The geographical coordinates of this site are: 00°21′28″N, 32°37′38″E (Latitude:0.357778; Longitude:32.627222).

== Overview ==
As of October 2023, The Uganda Ministry of Education maintained offices in several rented buildings in the Kampala city centre, including buildings owned by other government agencies. The ministry spends an estimated US$1.2 million (USh4.5 billion) annually on rent alone.

In 2010, both the MoES and the Uganda National Council for Higher Education (UNCHE) were allocated land to build their respective headquarters. UNCHE went ahead and erected their own building but MoES delayed. In 2015, the government of Uganda began discussions with the Islamic Development Bank (IsDB) to fund the construction of the headquarters of its Ministry of Education. Those discussions were concluded in 2020.

== Properties ==
The building complex comprises two adjacent towers; the tall one with 10 stories while the short one has eight above-ground floors. The development includes a 600-seat auditorium and two parking decks. The complex is designed to accommodate more that 700 staff members.

With the completion of this building the MoES expects to provide office accommodation to its Kampala-based staff, totaling in excess of 700, in one location to ease on the rent burden and improve on coordination and service delivery.

== Construction ==
The engineering, procurement and construction (EPC) contract was awarded to a joint venture between Sadeem Al-Kuwait General Trading & Contracting Company and Uganda-based Dott Services Limited. Groundbreaking occurred in October 2023, with commercial commissioning expected in 2025.

Symbion Uganda Limited was awarded the contract to design the development and supervise the construction on behalf of the stakeholders, at a contract price of US$508,639.

== Funding ==
The construction budget is reported at US$16.9 million (USh63.9 billion). The table below illustrates the sources of funding for this infrastructure project.

Uganda Education Complex Funding
Rank	Development Partner	Contribution in USD	Percentage	Notes
1	Islamic Development Bank	11.5 million	68.0	Loan
2	Government of Uganda	5.4 million	32.0	Investment
	Total	16.9 million	100.00	

== See also ==
- Kampala Capital City Authority
- List of tallest buildings in Kampala
- Uganda Ministry of Education and Sports
- Nakawa Division
