= Kanoni =

- Map of Uganda showing the location of Kanoni
- Coordinates: 00°10′22″N 31°54′21″E
- Country: Uganda
- Region: Central Region of Uganda
- District: Gomba District

Government
  - Member of Parliament: Mariam Najjemba
- Elevation: 1,242 m (4,075 ft)

Population (2014 Census)
  - Total: 12,439
- Time zone: UTC+3 (EAT)

Kanoni, also Kanoni, Gomba or Kanoni–Gomba, is a town in the Central Region of Uganda. It is the commercial, administrative, and political headquarters of Gomba District.

== Location ==
The town is located in Gomba District, in the Buganda Region of Uganda, approximately 96 kilometres (60 mi), southwest of Kampala, Uganda's capital and largest city. The town is located about 61 kilometres (38 mi) west of Mpigi, the nearest large metropolitan area, along the Mpigi–Kabulasoke–Maddu–Sembabule Road. The town lies at an average elevation of 1,242 metres (4,075 ft), above sea level. The coordinates of Kanoni are 0°10'22.0"N, 31°54'21.0"E (Latitude:0.172778; Longitude:31.905833).

== Population ==
During the national population census and household survey, conducted on 27 August 2014, the population of Kanoni was enumerated at 12,439 people.

== Points of interest ==
The following points of interest lie within or close to the town limits include the tarmacked Mpigi–Kabulasoke–Maddu–Sembabule Road, which passes through town, between Gombe and Kabulasoke.

The offices of Kanoni Town Council and the headquarters of Gomba District Administration are located in the town. A new radio station, (Gomba FM), started broadcasting in 2018, and Mubiru Motel, offers accommodation and meals.

Kanoni has one public health care facility, Kanoni Health Centre III, one pharmacy and a number of drug shops, where those who can afford the cost, can obtain medication for their ailments.

The town is home to several elementary schools, most of them private, and two secondary schools. There are four coffee processing factories in the town and one plastics manufacturing factory, Kanoni Plastic Works Company Limited (not operating as of September 2018).

== Notable people ==
- Robert Kyagulanyi Ssentamu

== See also ==
- Butambala District
- Sembabule District
- The Equator
- List of cities and towns in Uganda
