= Nkonge Solar Power Station =

Solar power stations in Uganda

Xsabo Nkonge Solarline
- Country: Uganda
- Location: Nkonge, Kasanda District
- Coordinates: 00°34′30″N 31°43′12″E
- Status: Generation & Sales License issued on 28 September 2020, Construction started 31 March 2021
- Construction began: 31 March 2021
- Commission date: June 2024
- Owner: The Xsabo Group
- Operator: Xsabo Nkonge Solarline Limited

Solar farm
- Type: Flat-panel PV

Power generation
- Nameplate capacity: 20 MW

External links
- Website: www.xsabogroup.com

The Xsabo Nkonge Power Station (Xsabo Nkonge Solarline) is a US$22 million 20 MW/AC solar power plant in Uganda that has been registered by the Electricity Regulatory Authority (ERA) in the national gazette for the implementation process following license issuance on 28 September 2020.

It is part of the $200 million planned investment of The Xsabo Group in Uganda for a total capacity of 150 megawatts.

When completed, Xsabo Nkonge Solarline is expected to be the largest grid-connected, privately-funded solar power plant not only in Uganda, but also in East and Central Africa, ahead of Soroti SPS (10 MW) and Tororo SPS (10 MW), and just a little bigger than The Xsabo Group‘s own Kabulasoke SPS with the same capacity of 20 MW, thanks to the Horizontal Tracking System that distinguishes Xsabo Nkonge Solarline from the solar project of the same brand in Kabulasoke.

Xsabo Lira Solarline (50MW), which is also part of The Xsabo Group, will become the largest solar power plant in Sub-Saharan Africa, outside of South Africa, when its anticipated commissioning takes place on 31 December 2025.

== Location ==
The power station is located in Nkonge Village, Bukuya Parish, in Kasanda District, in Uganda's Buganda Region. This is approximately 118 kilometres (73 mi) by road north-west of Kampala, the country's capital and largest city.

== Overview ==
The power station has a 20 megawatt capacity. Its output will be sold directly to the Uganda Electricity Transmission Company Limited for integration into the national grid. The power will be evacuated via a substation near the station.

== Developers ==
The power station is being developed by the company that owns it, which is Xsabo Nkonge Solarline Limited of The Xsabo Group, who successfully developed the 20 megawatt Kabulasoke Solar Power Station.

According to official public pronouncements by the Government of the Republic of Uganda, in particular the Electricity Regulatory Authority (ERA) and the Office of Uganda’s Vice President Edward Kiwanuka Ssekandi, as well as several interviews with Dr David Alobo, the owner and CEO/Managing Director of The Xsabo Group and the involved Local Governments of the Republic of Uganda, Xsabo plans to construct five solar power stations in different parts of Uganda with total capacity of 150 megawatts, at a budgeted cost of US$200 million. The five solar power stations are going to be developed in tandem, one after the other.

== Construction costs, funding, and commissioning ==
Construction of Xsabo Nkonge Solarline, which was ceremonially launched on 31 March 2021 by Uganda’s Vice President Edward Kiwanuka Ssekandi in the presence of Matthias Schauer, Ambassador of the Federal Republic of Germany to Uganda, Gen. Charles Angina (Deputy Chief Coordinator of the Presidential Initiative “Wealth Creation”) and Norbert Mao (President of the Democratic Party) as well as other national leaders and dignitaries, is expected to be concluded in time for commissioning by Uganda’s President Yoweri Kaguta Museveni end of June 2024 ahead of the 50 megawatts Xsabo Lira Solarline, whose commissioning is scheduled for the period around 31 December 2025.

== See also ==
- List of power stations in Uganda
- Umeme
