= Jacqueline Mbabazi =

Uganda politician and businesswoman

- Born: 18 August 1954 (age 71); Rukungiri District, Uganda
- Citizenship: Uganda
- Education: Bachelor of Science; Makerere University; Kampala, Uganda; Diploma in Education; Makerere University; Kampala, Uganda; Diploma in the Swedish Language; Sweden; Master of Science in Biotechnology; Sweden; Diploma in International Management; Sigtuna, Sweden
- Occupations: Educator & Politician
- Years active: 1976–present
- Known for: Politics

Jacqueline Susan Ruhindi Mbabazi (born 18 August 1954) is a Ugandan educator, politician and businesswoman who is the Member of Parliament for Older Persons in Western Uganda in the 12th Parliament where she doubles as Minister of State for Gender, Labour and Social Development, Elderly Affairs. She is the wife of the former prime minister of Uganda, Amama Mbabazi. She also serves as the Chairperson of the Women's League in the National Resistance Movement (NRM), the ruling political party in Uganda.

== Background ==
The fourth of eleven children, she was born in Rukungiri District on 18 August 1954 and is the daughter of Canon Gereshomu and Evalina Ruhindi.

== Education ==
Jacqueline Mbabazi attended several primary schools in Kabale District, where her father worked for the Church of Uganda. She attended Bweranyangi Girls' Senior Secondary School in Bushenyi District for her O’Level education. She then transferred to Trinity College Nabbingo for her A’Level studies. In 1973, she joined Makerere University, Uganda's largest and oldest public university, graduating in 1976, with the degree of Bachelor of Science (BSc) and a concurrent Diploma in Education. During the early 1980s, she continued her education in Sweden by obtaining the Diploma in the Swedish Language and the degree of Master of Sciences (MSc) in Biotechnology. Later she also obtained a Diploma in International Management at Sigtuna, Sweden.

== Work experience ==
Following her studies at Makerere University, she taught at Kitante Hill Secondary School, between 1976 until 1981. Following her return from exile in 1988, she worked with the Uganda Ministry of Defence, to set up the National Enterprise Corporation (NEC), a government organisation that aimed to re-integrate retired soldiers from the Uganda Bush War into civilian life.

She was one of the Ugandan technocrats who founded the Uganda Revenue Authority (URA) in 1992. Her initial position at the URA was Assistant Commissioner for Customs and Excise. She later became Deputy Commissioner and then Commissioner for Customs and Excise. In 1999, she left the Uganda Revenue Authority, to form, along with others, the Agency for National Development, a non-governmental organisation to help youth and women. She served as a non-Executive Director and Head of Training. After 3 years in that position, she served as the Managing Director of Luweero Industries Limited, a government-owned small-arms manufacturer. She retired from government service.

On 8 December 2017 Mbabazi was appointed as chairperson for the board of directors of the Uganda Microfinance Regulatory Authority.

== Political Career ==
Jacqueline is the Member of Parliament representing Older persons in Western Uganda in the 12th Parliament where she doubles as Minister of State for Gender, Labour and Social Development, Elderly Affairs. During the 2026 general elections, she was declared unopposed for the above seat after her opponent Patrick Mutabwire Kyamukaate failed to meet the nomination requirements.

== Personal details ==
She is married to the former prime minister of Uganda, Amama Mbabazi. They have six children and eleven grandchildren. Jacqueline Mbabazi is fluent in Runyakitara, English and Swedish.

== Other responsibilities ==
Following her retirement from civil service, she now works full-time for the Agency for National Development. She concurrently serves as the Chairperson of the National Women's League of the National Resistance Movement, the ruling political party in Uganda. She is also Lay Canon in the Church of Uganda.

== See also ==
- Districts of Uganda
- List of political parties in Uganda
