= Bernadette Olowo =

Ugandan diplomat

Bernadette Olowo, later Olowo-Freers (born c. 1948) is a Ugandan former diplomat.

Olowo is an alumna of Trinity College Nabbingo and served for a time as Uganda's ambassador to Germany. She was named ambassador of Uganda to the Vatican City in 1975, becoming the first woman in over 900 years to be accepted as a diplomat by the Vatican. In the 1990s she began working with UNICEF and UNAIDS on projects to combat AIDS in southern and eastern Africa.
