= Gombe, Butambala =

Gombe, Butambala Gombe
- Location in Uganda
- Coordinates: 0°10′52″N 32°06′51″E
- Country: Uganda
- Region: Central Region of Uganda
- District: Butambala District

Government
  - Mayor: Al-Hajj Hassan (NRM)
- Elevation: 3,900 ft (1,200 m)

Population (2014 Census)
  - Total: 15,196

Gombe, Butambala, often referred to simply as Gombe, is a municipality in Butambala District in the Central Region of Uganda. It is the main municipal, administrative, and commercial center of the district and the site of the district headquarters.

== Location ==
Gombe is located approximately 68 kilometres (42 mi), by road, south-west of Kampala, the capital and largest city of Uganda. This is approximately 34 kilometres (21 mi), by road, west of the town of Mpigi, the largest metropolitan area in the sub-region. The coordinates of Gombe, Butambala are 0°10'52.0"N, 32°06'51.0"E (Latitude:0.181111; Longitude:32.114167).

== Population ==
In August 2014, the national population census put Gombe's population at 15,196.

== Points of interest ==
The following additional points of interest lie within or near the town:

- headquarters of Gombe Town Council
- Gombe central market
- Gombe Secondary School
- Gombe General Hospital, a 100-bed public hospital administered by the Uganda Ministry of Health
- Mpigi–Kabulasoke–Maddu–Sembabule Road, passing through the middle of town

== See also ==
- Gombe, Wakiso
- Hospitals in Uganda
- List of cities and towns in Uganda
