= Xsabo Lira Solarline =

Solar power plant in Uganda

- Country: Uganda
- Location: Lira, Lira District
- Coordinates: 2°21′19″N 32°55′37″E
- Status: MoU between Local Government and The Xsabo Group cleared by Attorney General of Uganda and signed (Public-Private-Partnership with Government)
- Construction began: 10 January 2022 (Expected)
- Commission date: 31 December 2024 (Expected)
- Owner: The Xsabo Group
- Operator: Xsabo Lira Solarline Limited

Solar farm
- Type: Flat-panel PV

Power generation
- Nameplate capacity: 50 MW (67,000 hp)

External links
- Website: www.xsabogroup.com

The Xsabo Lira Power Station (Xsabo Lira Solarline) is a US$45 million 50 MW/AC solar power plant in Uganda that will be implemented as a ‘’Public-Private-Partnership (PPP)’’ with Lira District Local Government. The corresponding Memorandum of Understanding (MoU) has been approved by the Attorney General of the Republic of Uganda.

Xsabo Lira Solarline is part of the US$200 million planned investment of The Xsabo Group, whose owner and brain child is the Germany-based Ugandan Dr. David Alobo, in Uganda for a total capacity of 150MW.

When completed, Xsabo Lira Solarline is expected to be the largest grid-connected, privately funded solar power plant not only in Uganda, but also in Sub-Saharan Africa (excepting South Africa), ahead of Soroti Solar Power Station (10 MW), Tororo Solar Power Station (10 MW) and The Xsabo Group's own two large solar power plants, namely its 20MW Pilot Solar Park in Kabulasoke (Kabulasoke Solar Power Station) and Xsabo Nkonge Solarline (Nkonge Solar Power Station) (20MW).

Xsabo Lira Solarline (50MW) is expected to be commissioned on 31 December 2024.

== Location ==
The Lira solar power project site is in Ngeta, a suburb of Lira Municipality located just off Lira-Kitgum Road in Lira District, in Northern Uganda. Lira is approximately 257.9 kilometres (160.3 mi) by road north of Kampala, the country's capital and largest city.

== Overview ==
The power station will have a 50 megawatt capacity. Its output will be sold directly to the Uganda Electricity Transmission Company Limited (UETCL) for integration into the national grid. The power will be evacuated via a substation adjacent to the solar power park.

== Developers ==
The power station is being developed by The Xsabo Group, also owners of the 20 megawatt Kabulasoke Solar Power Station and Xsabo Nkonge Solarline (Nkonge Solar Power Station), also with a capacity of 20MW. Xsabo Lira Solarline Limited is the designated special purpose vehicle for The Xsabo Group’s Solar Power Project in Lira.

According to official public pronouncements by the Government of the Republic of Uganda, in particular the Electricity Regulatory Authority (ERA) and the Office of Uganda's Vice President Edward Kiwanuka Ssekandi as well as the involved Local Governments of the Republic of Uganda, The Xsabo Group plans to construct five solar power stations in different parts of Uganda with total capacity of 150 megawatts, at a budgeted cost of US$200 million.

The five solar power stations are going to be developed in tandem, one after the other.

== Construction costs, funding, and commissioning ==
Construction is planned to be launched in December 2023, 9 months after commissioning of Xsabo Nkonge Solarline (Nkonge Solar Power Station) on 31 March 2023 and to be concluded with commissioning on 31 December 2024.

== See also ==
- List of power stations in Uganda
- Umeme
