= Mpigi–Kabulasoke–Maddu–Sembabule Road =

Road in Uganda

Coordinates: 00°10′26″N 31°55′27″E

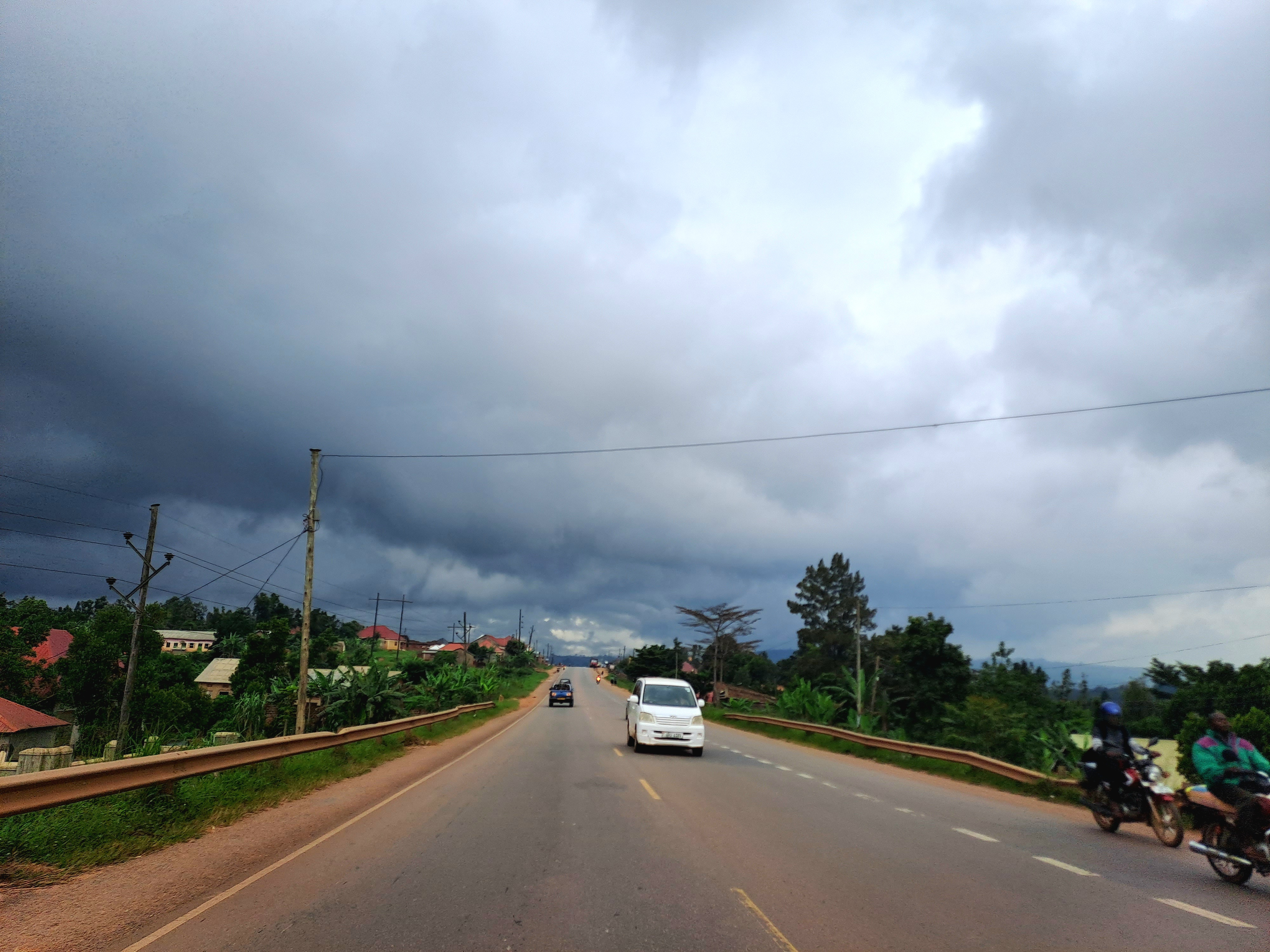

Route information
- Length: 84 mi (135 km)
- History: Designation in 2014; Expected completion in 2017

Major junctions
- East end: Mpigi
- Gombe; Kanoni; Kabulasoke; Maddu
- West end: Sembabule

Location
- Country: Uganda

Highway system
- Roads in Uganda

Mpigi–Kabulasoke–Maddu–Sembabule Road is a road in the Central Region of Uganda, connecting the towns of Mpigi in Mpigi District to Gombe in Butambala District, Kabulasoke and Maddu in Gomba District and Sembabule in Sembabule District.

== Location ==
The road starts at Mpigi, a town of 44,274, about 39 kilometres (24 mi), southwest of Kampala, the capital of Uganda and the largest city in that country. The road continues through four central Ugandan districts to end at Ssembabule, a total distance of about 139 kilometres (86 mi).

== Upgrading to bitumen ==
In October 2010, Uganda National Roads Authority, a parastatal, publicly announced that in 2011, it would begin upgrading 1,000 kilometres (620 mi) of 32 different national roads in the country, from unsealed gravel surface to class II bitumen. This road was one of the roads on that list.

The road was divided into two sections; (a) Mpigi–Kanoni Road 64 kilometres (40 mi) and (b) Kanoni–Sembabule Road 71 kilometres (44 mi). Work on both sections started in 2014, with expected completion in the second half of 2017. A related road, the Sembale–Villa Maria Road 38 kilometres (24 mi) is under the same contract and work on that road is expected to begin in September 2015, with completion expected in 2018. Finding is 100 percent provided by the Ugandan government.

== See also ==
- Maddu
- List of roads in Uganda
- Economy of Uganda
- Transport in Uganda
