= Ministry of Education and Sports (Uganda) =

Government ministry of Uganda

Coordinates: 00°18′50″N 32°35′15″E

- Coat of Arms of Uganda

Ministry overview
- Type: Ministry
- Jurisdiction: Government of Uganda
- Headquarters: Kampala, Uganda
- Ministry executive: Janet Museveni, Minister of Education and Sports
- Website: www.education.go.ug

The Ministry of Education and Sports (MES), is a cabinet-level ministry of Uganda. It is mandated "to provide technical support, guide, coordinate, regulate and promote quality education, training and sports to all persons in Uganda for national integration, development and individual advancement", according to the website of the ministry.

== Location ==
The headquarters of the ministry are located in Embassy House, on King George VI Way, at the corner with Parliament Avenue, in the Central Division of Kampala, Uganda's capital and largest city. The coordinates of the ministry headquarters are:0°18'50.0"N, 32°35'15.0"E (Latitude:0.313889; Longitude:32.587500).

== Organisational structure ==
The ministry is overseen by a cabinet minister, currently Janet Museveni, since 6 June 2016. She is assisted by three ministers of state; Joyce Moriku Kaducu serves as Minister of State for Primary Education, John Chrysestom Muyingo serves as Minister of State for Secondary Education, and Peter Ogwang serves as Minister of State for sports.

== Directorates ==
Administratively, the ministry is divided into three directorates: (a) Directorate of Education Standards, (b) Directorate of Basic and Secondary Education, and (c) Directorate of Higher, Technical and Vocational Education and Training.

== Departments ==
The ministry is further subdivided into the following departments: (1) Finance and Administration, (2) Department of Education Planning, (3) Department of Pre-Primary and Primary Education, (4) Department of Secondary Education, (5) Department of Higher Education, (6) Department of Private Schools and Institutions, (7) Department of Teacher Education, (8) Department of Special Needs and Inclusive Education, (9) Department of Business, Technical and Vocational Education, (10) Department of Guidance and Counselling, (11) Department of Physical Education and Sports, (12) HIV/AIDS Unit and (13) Gender Unit.

== List of ministers ==
- Kiddu Makubuya (1999 - 14 January 2005)
- Namirembe Bitamazire (14 January 2005 - 27 May 2011)
- Jessica Alupo (27 May 2011 - 6 June 2016) (Note: Minister of Education, Sports, Science and Technology from 1 March 2015.)
- Janet Museveni (6 June 2016 - present)

== See also ==
- Politics of Uganda
- Cabinet of Uganda
- Education in Uganda
- Uganda Ministry of Education Complex
