= Drake P Mirembe =

Ugandan computer scientist and academic

Drake Patrick Mirembe
- Education: University of Groningen
- Known for: Founding Microsoft Innovation Center Uganda; ICT innovation and incubation in Uganda
- Scientific career
- Fields: Information systems security, ICT for Development, Digital security
- Workplaces: Makerere University; Uganda Technology and Management University

Drake Patrick Mirembe is a Ugandan computer scientist, academic, and ICT consultant. He is known for his contributions to information systems security, ICT for development, and innovation incubation in Uganda. He holds a PhD in information systems security from the University of Groningen in the Netherlands.

== Early life and education ==
Mirembe earned his PhD in information systems security from the University of Groningen, the Netherlands.

== Career ==
Mirembe is a lecturer at Makerere University with over 18 years of experience in both academia and industry.

=== Academia ===
He serves as a lecturer and researcher in the Department of Networks at Makerere University, where he is also Head of the Engaged Scholars Academic Network (ESCANET).

He was the founding Head of the Centre for Innovations and Professional Skills Development (CiPSD) at the College of Computing and Information Sciences, Makerere University.

In 2013, he founded the Center for Innovation and Business Incubation (CIBI) at Uganda Technology and Management University.

=== Industry and innovation ===
Mirembe served as the founding Manager of the Microsoft Innovation Center Uganda, hosted at the College of Computing and Information Sciences, Makerere University.

He has worked as a senior ICT and management consultant for various organizations, specializing in ICT integration, business process modeling, wireless technologies, human capital development, organizational development, institutional leadership, software development, and IT security services.

He has been involved in ICT professional skills development and innovation in Uganda for over 18 years, serving as a trainer, community projects manager, mentor, and software developer.

=== Entrepreneurship ===
Mirembe co-founded several enterprises: Eight Tech Consults, where he serves as Senior Consultant. and ClinicMaster International, where he serves as chair of the board of directors.

== Research ==
- Leveraging Social Media in Higher Education: A Case of Universities in Uganda.
- Threat modeling revisited: Improving expressiveness of attack
- A model for electronic money transfer for low resourced environments: M-cash
- Developing and piloting a multi-channel ICT-Enabled Model to enhance University engagement with smallholder farming communities in Uganda
- E-learning platforms and security mechanisms used by educational institutions in Kampala, Uganda
- Design of a secure framework for the implementation of telemedicine, eHealth, and wellness services
- The threat nets approach to information system security risk analysis
- Enhancing agricultural knowledge sharing among smallholder farmers in Uganda: An evaluation of mobile and web technologies
- A model for data management in peer-to-peer systems
- Scaling trust and reputation management in cloud services
