= Kitante Hill Secondary School =

Coordinates: 00°20′02″N 32°35′06″E

Kitante Hill School
- Kampala, Kampala District; Uganda

Information
- Type: Public Middle School and High School (8–13)
- Motto: Seek knowledge and serve with integrity
- Established: 1960
- Enrollment: 1,600+
- Athletics: Track, Tennis, Volleyball, Basketball and Golf
- Website: https://www.kitantehillschool.ac.ug

Kitante Hill Senior Secondary School (KHSS), sometimes referred to as Kitante Hill School, is a public, mixed, day school located in Kitante, a neighborhood in the city of Kampala, the capital and largest metropolitan area in Uganda. It caters to middle school grades (S1 to S4) and to high school grades (S5 to S6).

== Location ==
The school is located in the Kitante neighborhood in Kampala's Central Division, approximately 3 kilometres (1.9 mi), by road, north-east of the city's central business district. Neighboring institutions include Kitante Primary School, a public elementary day school, and the Uganda Museum. The school can be accessed off of Acacia Avenue (John Babiiha Avenue), on Kololo Hill or off of Kira Road on Mulago Hill. The coordinates of the school are 0°20'02.4"N, 32°35'06.0"E (Latitude:0.3340; Longitude:32.5850).

== Overview ==
KHSS was established in 1960 to cater for the children of civil servants in the about-to-be independent Uganda. It started with a population of 200 students and was limited to O-Level classes until 1986 when A-Level studies were introduced. Initially a boys-only school, it became co-ed in 1987. The student population in April 2014 exceeds 1,600.

== Academics ==
The school teaches both science and liberal arts subjects.

== Notable alumni ==
- Kiiza Besigye – Retired Colonel in the Uganda People's Defence Force. Former presidential candidate in 2001, 2006, 2011 and 2016.
- Moses Ssali – Musician also known as Bebe Cool
- Nicholas Tatambuka ("Nick Nola") – singer and dancer.
- Robert Kyagulanyi – Recording artist aka Bobi Wine
- Moses Muhangi – Boxer and president of the Uganda Boxing Federation

== Notable faculty ==
- Jacqueline Mbabazi – Educator and politician. Taught science subjects at the school between 1976 and 1981.

== See also ==
- Education in Uganda
- Kampala District
