= Lydia Daphine Mirembe =

Ugandan politician

Daphine Lydia Mirembe

Member of Parliament, Butambala District (District Woman Representative)
- Incumbent
- Assumed office 2016

Personal details
- Born: August 14, 1985 (age 40) Ugandan
- Party: Independent
- Education: Uganda Certificate of Education (2002), Kibibi Secondary School; Uganda Advanced Certificate of Education (2004), Kibibi Secondary School; Bachelor's in Leisure and Hospitality Management (2009), Makerere University Business School
- Alma mater: Makerere University Business School
- Occupation: Politician
- Known for: District Woman Representative for Butambala District
- Committees: Committee on HIV/AIDS and Related Diseases; Committee on Health

Daphine Lydia Mirembe (born 14 August 1985) is a Ugandan politician. She is the district women's representative for Butambala District in the Parliament of Uganda. She won the seat in parliament in 2016 on an independent ticket after defeating Aisha Kabanda of the National resistance movement (NRM) at the 2016 Ugandan general elections.

== Education ==
Mirembe attended Kibibi secondary school for her 'O' level and 'A' level education. She attained her Uganda Certificate of Education in 2002 and Uganda Advanced Certificate of Education in 2004. She later joined the Makerere University Business School where she graduated with a Bachelor in Leisure and Hospitality Management in 2009.

== Career ==
Mirembe is currently a member of parliament representing Butambala district as the district woman representative, a position she has held since 2016. In parliament, she serves on the committee on HIV/AIDS related disease and the committee on health. She is also a member of the Uganda Women Parliamentary Association where she serves on the sexual offences bill round table committee. She is also a member of the Buganda caucus in the parliament.

Before joining parliament Mirembe was serving in the capacity of director of Mirembe Foundation from 2013 to 2016. And earlier in her career was a banker with Orient Bank between 2011 and 2012.

== See also ==
- Parliament of Uganda
