= Nsangi =

- Map of Uganda showing the location of Nsangi
- Coordinates: 00°17′03″N 32°27′18″E
- Country: Uganda
- Region: Central Uganda
- District: Wakiso District
- County: Busiro
- Constituency: Busiro South

Population (2009 Estimate)
  - Total: 3,522
- Time zone: UTC+3 (EAT)

Nsangi is a town in the Central Region of Uganda. It is one of the urban centers in Wakiso District.

== Location ==
Nsangi is located in Nsangi Parish, Nsangi sub-county, Wakiso District, in Uganda's Central Region. The town is situated on the tarmacked, all-weather Kampala–Masaka Road, approximately 25 kilometres (16 mi), south-west Kampala, Uganda's capital and largest city. Nsangi is approximately 17 kilometres (11 mi), by road, northeast of Mpigi Town, the nearest large town. The coordinates of Nsangi town are: 0°17'03.0"N 32°27'18.0"E (Latitude:0.284167; Longitude:32.455000).

== Population ==
In 2009, the population of Nsangi was estimated at 3,522, by the Uganda Bureau of Statistics.

== Points of interest ==
The following points of interest are found within the own limits or near the town boundaries: (a) The administrative headquarters of Nsangi sub-county, an administrative unit of Wakiso District Administration (b) The offices of Nsangi Town Council (c) Nsangi Central Market (d) Chrysanthemums Uganda Limited - A horticultural farm belonging to the Madhvani Group (e) The Kampala-Masaka Road - The highway passes through town in a northeast to southwest direction (f) Nsangi Secondary School, a public, mixed, day high school.

== Economic activity ==
In the environs of town and in the surrounding Nsangi sub-county and in neighboring Ssisa sub-county, many households have engaged in the growing of Khat, also known as Miraa, but is locally referred to as Mairungi or Mayirungi. The product is sold in Kampala to members of the Somali community in Kisenyi, a section of the city. Truck drivers from neighboring Kenya also buy it for personal use and for re-sale in Kenya, where its use is more prevalent. Local growers have built houses, schools and bought personal property from the sale of this product. (Luganda)

== See also ==
- Wakiso
- Madhvani Group
- Wakiso District
- Central Region, Uganda
