= List of floriculture companies in Uganda =

This is a list of licensed flower growing and exporting companies in Uganda.

- Africa International Tree Centre
- Blessed Events Limited
- Chrysanthemums Uganda Limited
- Fiduga Limited
- Flower Place Limited
- Fresh Handling Limited
- Holding Limited
- Jackson Uganda Limited
- Jambo Roses
- JP Cuttings Limited
- Kajjansi Roses Limited
- Mairye Estate Limited
- Melissa Flowers Limited
- Nimu Designs Limited
- Amuru Agroforestry and Flower Limited
- Party Services Florists & Decorators Limited
- Pearl Flowers Limited
- Plants Africa Limited
- Premier Roses Limited
- Rosebud Limited
- Royal Van Zanten Limited
- Rusadia Florists Limited
- Sulma Foods Limited
- Uganda Flowers Limited
- Uganda Heritage Roots Limited
- Uganda Hortech Limited
- Ugarose Flowers Limited
- Venu Farmers Limited
- Victoria Flower Limited
- Wagagai Limited
- XClusive Cuttings Limited
