= Kyengera =

- Map of Uganda showing the location of Kyengera
- Coordinates: 00°17′46″N 32°30′19″E
- Country: Uganda
- Region: Central Region
- District: Wakiso District
- County: Busiro
- Constituency: Busiro East

Population (2024 Census)
  - Total: 311,112
- Time zone: UTC+3 (EAT)

Kyengera is a town in the Central Region of Uganda. It is one of the urban centers in Wakiso District.

== Location ==
The town is on the tarmacked, all-weather Kampala-Masaka Highway. Kyengera is approximately 9 kilometres (5.6 mi), by road, south-west of Kampala, Uganda's capital and largest city. The coordinates of the town are 0°17'46.0"N, 32°30'19.0"E (Latitude:0.296112; Longitude:32.505275).

== Points of interest ==
The following points of interest lie within the town limits or near the edges of town:

- Offices of Kyengera Town Council.
- Kyengera Mall, the newest and most iconic storeyed mall in town
- Mugwanya Summit College (Secondary School)
- Kabojja Campus of Islamic University in Uganda, which admits only females, is about 2 kilometres (1.2 mi) east of Kyengera.
- Kyengera is the first urban centre enroute Southwest upon exiting both the Northern Bypass and Entebbe Airport Expressway, whose interchange is Busega Roundabout in Busega - Located on the edge of Kampala city, about (2.5 miles) north of Kyengera. The roundabout is the western endpoint of the Kampala Northern Bypass Highway and is the northern endpoint of the Entebbe-Kampala Expressway
- Kyengera Police Station - An establishment of the Uganda National Police
- King's College Budo- a school founded in 1905 to educate Uganda's aristocrats
- Trinity College Nabbingo- one of the best known Catholic girls schools in Uganda
- St Mark's Church Nsangi opened in the 1930s
- Nsangi Primary School opened in 1913
- Kalema's Kkomera where dozens of Buganda royals were incarcerated in the 1890s by King Abdul Kalema
- Naggalabi Buddo site where Buganda coronations have been held since the 1500s
- Mugwanya Preparatory School that was founded by the Brothers of Christian Instruction
- Nalumunye Housing Estate
- Majority of villages in Kyengera have very poor phone network on both MTN and Airtel lines
