= Kampala–Masaka Road =

Road in Uganda

Route information
- Length: 79 mi (127 km)
- History: Designated in 2009; Completion in 2012

Major junctions
- North end: Kibuye
- Busega; Kyengera; Nsangi; Mpigi; Lukaya
- South end: Masaka

Location
- Country: Uganda

Highway system
- Roads in Uganda

The Kampala–Masaka Road is a road in the Central Region of Uganda, connecting the capital city of Kampala to the southwestern town of Masaka in Masaka District. The first 36 kilometres (22 mi) of this road, is in the process of being developed into the Kampala–Mpigi Expressway.

== Location ==
The road begins in the Kibuye neighborhood, in Makindye Division, southwestern Kampala. It continues to Busega, then through Kyengera, Nsangi, Mpigi and Lukaya, to end at Masaka, a distance of approximately 127 kilometres (79 mi).

== Overview ==
This road is one of the busiest in the country, with an average daily traffic count of 20,908 vehicles in 2008. In 2009, the government of Uganda (GOU), began to upgrade the previously bitumen-surfaced road in poor state, to grade II bituminous surface with drainage channels, culverts and shoulders. The first phase of improvements began in 2009 and ended in 2011, fully funded by the GOU. The first phase cost US$44.8 million (about Sh103 billion).

During the second phase of the road improvement, the road was widened from 6.5 metres (21 ft) to 11 metres (36 ft), passing and climbing lanes were added as well as pedestrian and bicyclists' lanes. The work was contracted to Reynolds Construction Company, who had carried out he first phase. The second phase lasted from 2012 until 2013. Despite the improvements, the road remains one of the most accident-prone highways in the country.

== Accidents ==
The Kampala–Masaka Road is the most accident-prone stretch of highway in Uganda, recording between 200 and 300 fatalities annually. Ugandan officials attribute the high accident rate to several factors including (a) speeding (b) failure to observe traffic signs (c) overloading of passenger vehicles (d) overloading of merchandise trucks (e) dilapidated vehicles (f) driving while intoxicated (g) lax laws against traffic offenses (h) a slow justice system.

== Kibuye–Busega section ==
In October 2020, the New Vision newspaper reported that the government of Japan, through the Japan International Cooperation Agency (JICA), was evaluating the financing of the 8 kilometres (5 mi) section from Kubuye to Busega, where this road intersects with the Entebbe–Kampala Expressway and the Kampala Northern Bypass Highway. It is envisaged to construct an elevated dual-carriage highway for the entire length of this section. Preliminary estimates have put the cost of this section of urban highway at about US$500 million.

== See also ==
- List of roads in Uganda
