= Gomba District =

- District
- District location in Uganda
- Coordinates: 00°11′S 31°55′E
- Country: Uganda
- Region: Central Uganda
- Established: 1 July 2010
- Capital: Kanoni

Area
  - Land: 1,679.3 km^{2} (648.4 sq mi)

Population (2012 estimate)
  - Total: 152,800
  - Density: 91/km^{2} (240/sq mi)
- Time zone: UTC+3 (EAT)
- Website: www.gomba.go.ug

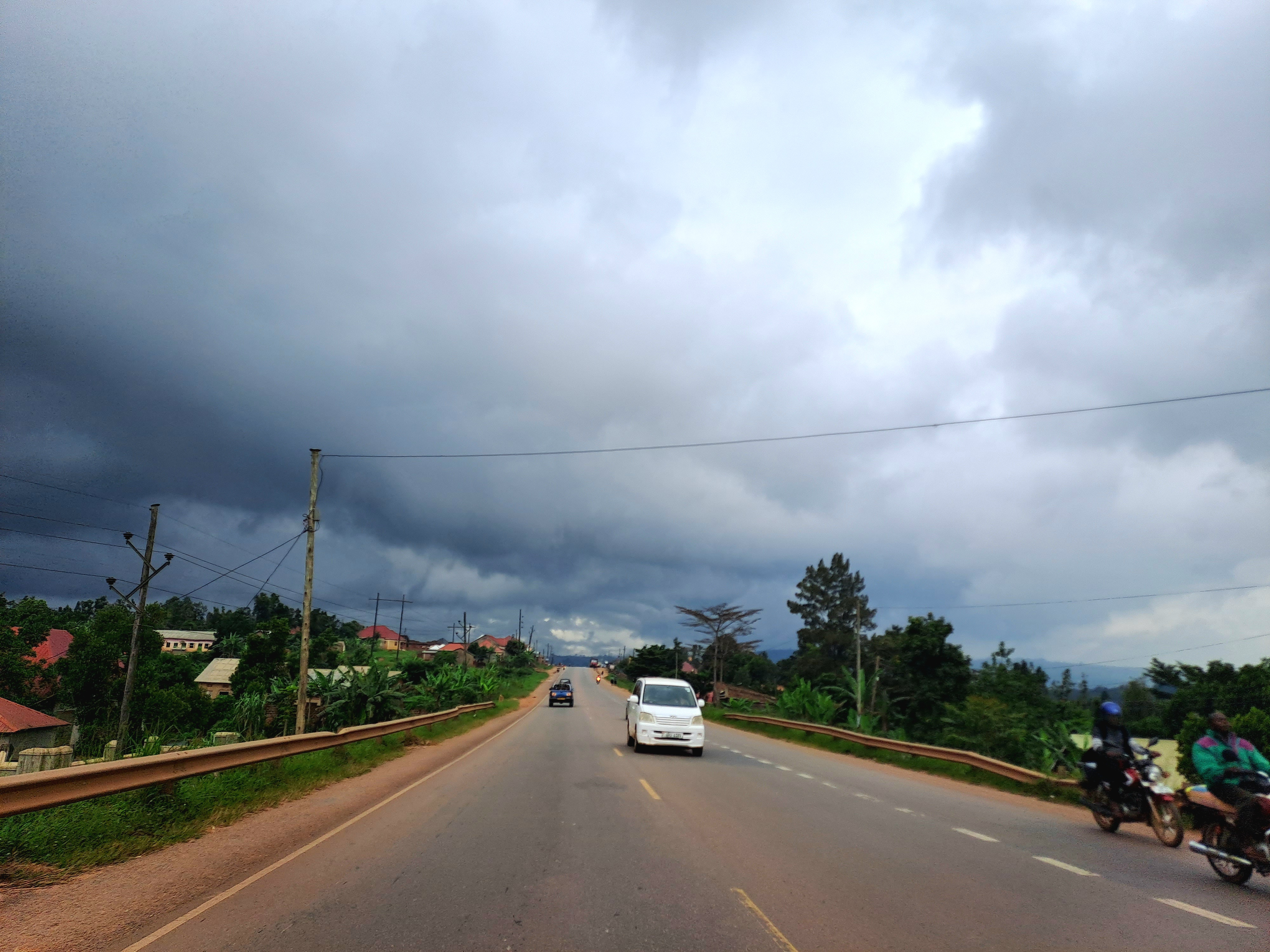
Mpigi-Gomba road

Gomba is a district in Central Uganda.

== Location ==
Gomba District is bordered by Mubende District to the west and north, Mityana District to the northeast and Butambala District to the east. Kalungu District, Bukomansimbi District and Sembabule District lie to the south of Gomba District. Kanoni, where the district headquarters are located, lies approximately 97 kilometres (60 mi), by road, southwest of Kampala, the capital of Uganda and the largest city in that country. This location is approximately 60 kilometres (37 mi), by road, west of Mpigi, the nearest large metropolitan area. The coordinates of the district are:00 11N, 31 55E. (Latitude:0.1750; Longitude:31.9100).

== Overview ==
Gomba District was created in 2010 by an Act of Parliament, when Mpigi District was split into Gomba District, Butambala District and Mpigi District. The town of Kanoni was selected to be the district headquarters. The district became operational on 1 July 2010. Generally, Gomba District is a rural district which receives lower precipitation than the districts of Butambala and Mpigi. Livestock farming is a major economic activity in the district supplemented with subsistence agriculture.

== Population ==
In 1991, the national census estimated the district population at about 119,550. The next census in 2002 estimated the population of Gomba District at approximately 133,300. In 2012, the estimated population in the district was about 152,800.

== See also ==
- Kanoni
- Mpigi District
- Butambala District
- Central Uganda
- Uganda Districts
