= Butambala District =

Butambala
- District
- District location in Uganda
- Coordinates: 00°12′N 32°06′E
- Country: Uganda
- Region: Central Region
- Capital: Gombe

Area
  - Land: 405.6 km^{2} (156.6 sq mi)

Population (2012 Estimate)
  - Total: 99,400
  - Density: 245.1/km^{2} (635/sq mi)
- Time zone: UTC+3 (EAT)
- Website: www.butambala.go.ug

Butambala District is a district in the Central Region of Uganda.

== Location ==
This district is bordered by Gomba District to the west and north-west, Mityana District to the north-east, Mpigi District to the east and south, and Kalungu District to the south-west. The district headquarters at Gombe are approximately 31 kilometres (19 mi), by road, west of the town of Mpigi, the largest metropolitan area in the sub-region. This is approximately 68 kilometres (42 mi), by road, south-west of Kampala, Uganda's capital and largest city.

== History ==
Created by an act of parliament, the district became operational on 1 July 2010, having been split off of Mpigi District, together with neighboring Gomba District. Before becoming district, the area was Butambala County, one of the eighteen counties that constitute the Kingdom of Buganda.

== Population ==
The national population census in 1991 estimated the district population at 74,100. The 2002 census put the population at about 86,800. In 2012, the population was estimated a 99,400.

== Economic activity ==
Subsistence agriculture and small-scale animal husbandry are the backbone of Butambala District's economy. The main food crops are:

- Beans
- Groundnuts
- Sugar cane
- Bananas
- Matooke
- Maize
- Mangoes
