= Mpigi =

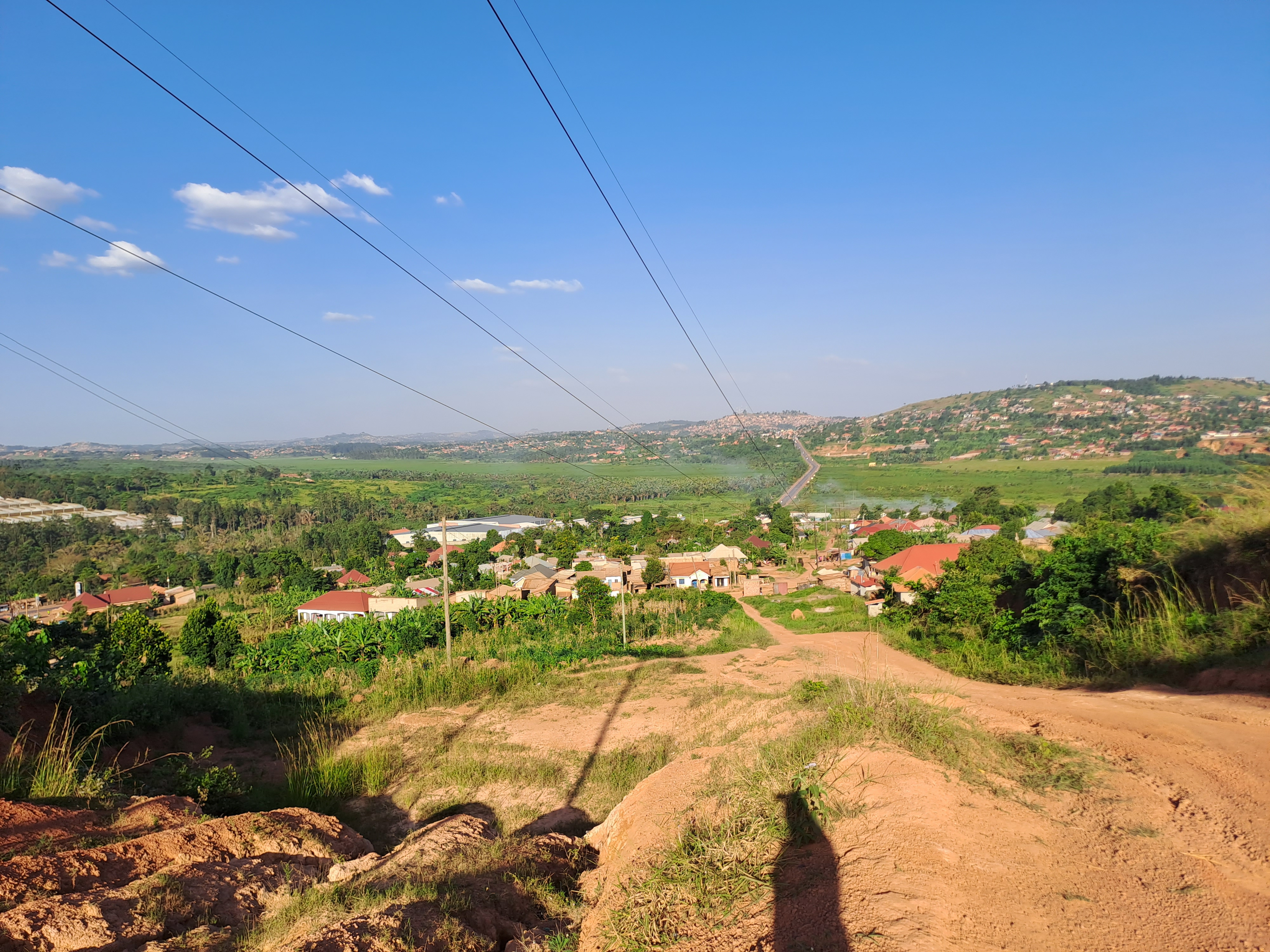

- Location in Uganda
- Coordinates: 00°13′48″N 32°19′48″E
- Country: Uganda
- Region: Central Uganda
- District: Mpigi District
- Elevation: 3,993 ft (1,217 m)

Population (2024 Census)
  - Total: 48,461

Mpigi is a town in Mawokota County, Mpigi District, in Central Uganda. Mpigi is the municipal, administrative and commercial headquarters of Mpigi District. The district is named after the town.

== Location ==
Mpigi is an important transit town located approximately 40 kilometres (25 mi) southwest of Kampala, Uganda's capital and largest city, along the Kampala–Masaka Road. The location of Mpigi town makes it an access point to the districts of Mpigi, Wakiso, Butambala, Gomba, Mityana, Kalungu and Kalangala, through various fishing landing sites on the shores of Lake Victoria. On Mbale Hill, which lies within the town, resides one of Buganda's most renowned traditional gods; Kibuuka Omumbaale. This hill is the ancestral home of the "Ndiga" (sheep) clan. The geographical coordinates of the town are 0°13'48.0"N 32°19'48.0"E (Latitude:0.2300, Longitude:32.3300). Mpigi Town Council sits at an average elevation of 1,217 metres (3,993 ft) above mean sea level.

== Population ==
At the 2002 national census, the population of Mpigi town was 34,400. In 2010, the Uganda Bureau of Statistics (UBOS), estimated the population of the town at 38,300. In 2011, the UBOS estimated the population of Mpigi at 38,800. In 2014, the national population census put the population of Mpigi at 43,360.

In 2015, the UBOS estimated the population of the town at 44,200. In 2020, the population agency estimated Mpigi's mid-year population at 49,500 people, of whom 25,200 (50.9 percent) were female and 24,300 (49.1 percent) were male. The UBOS calculated that the population of Mpigi Town grew at an average rate of 2.29 percent annually, between 2015 and 2020.

Historical population
Year	Pop.	±%
2002	34,400	—
2010	38,300	+11.3%
2011	38,800	+1.3%
2014	43,360	+11.8%
2015	44,200	+1.9%
2020	49,500	+12.0%

== Points of interest ==
The following points of interest are located inside Mpigi Town or close to its borders:

- The headquarters of Mpigi District Administration
- The offices of Mpigi Town Council
- Mpigi Central Market
- Mpigi Chief Magistrate's Court
- Mpigi Military Barracks, an establishment of the Uganda People's Defence Force
- Mpigi Police Barracks, an establishment of the Uganda Police Force
- Mpigi Prison, an establishment of the Uganda Prisons Department
- Mpigi Hospital, a 100-bed hospital administered by the Uganda Ministry of Health
- Kampala-Mpigi Expressway, a four-lane dual carriageway toll road between Kampala and Mpigi, under construction, with completion expected in 2025
- Social Innovation Academy (SINA), residential academy where young entrepreneurs are equipped with training and support to grow their business venture.

== Drums ==
The town is well known as the capital of the drum factories such as the ngoma drums. All drums here are handmade.

== See also ==
- List of cities and towns in Uganda
