= Mpigi District =

- District
- District location in Uganda
- Coordinates: 00°14′N 32°20′E
- Country: Uganda
- Region: Central Uganda
- Capital: Mpigi

Area
  - Land: 1,207.8 km^{2} (466.3 sq mi)

Population (2012 Estimate)
  - Total: 215,500
  - Density: 178.4/km^{2} (462/sq mi)
- Time zone: UTC+3 (EAT)
- Website: www.mpigi.go.ug

Mpigi District is a district in Central Uganda. Like most other Ugandan districts, it is named after its 'main town', Mpigi.

== Location ==
Mpigi District is bordered by Wakiso District to the north and east, Kalangala District to the south, Kalungu District to the southwest, Butambala District to the west and Mityana District to the northwest. The town of Mpigi, where the district headquarters are located, lies approximately 37 kilometres (23 mi) west of Kampala, Uganda's capital and largest city. The coordinates of the district are:00 14N, 32 20E.

== Overview ==
In the 1970s, Mpigi District comprised the Buganda Kingdom counties of Kyaddondo, Busiro, Mawokota, Butambala and Gomba. During the 1990s, Kyaddondo and Busiro were peeled off to form Wakiso District. In 2010, Gomba split off to form Gomba District and Butambala became Butambala District. Mawokota remained as the sole constituent of Mpigi District.

== Population ==
In 1991, the district population was estimated at 157,400. At the 2002 census, the population of the district was about 187,800, with an annual growth rate of 1.4%. In 2012, the population of Mpigi District was estimated at 215,500. The district is primarily a rural district, with only 8.4% of the population living in urban areas.

== Education ==
Mpigi is one of the few areas in Uganda and likely the whole of Africa to have Humanist schools. The Uganda Humanist Schools Trust UHST sponsors 3 Humanist schools with the support of the International Humanist Ethical Union.

== Economic activities ==
The major economic activity in Mpigi District is agriculture. The major crops include:

- Sweet potatoes
- Beans
- Cassava
- Maize
- Bananas
- Groundnuts
- Coffee
- Cotton
- Tomatoes
- Cabbage
- Onions
- Avocado

== See also ==
- Mpigi
- Central Region, Uganda
- Districts of Uganda
