= Central Region, Uganda =

Region of Uganda

Central Buganda
- Region
- Coordinates: 00°19′N 032°35′E
- Country: Uganda
- Region: Central
- Regional capital: Kampala

Area
  - Total: 61,403.2 km^{2} (23,707.9 sq mi)
- Elevation: 1,200 m (3,900 ft)

Population (2024 census)
  - Total: 12,969,646
  - Density: 211.221/km^{2} (547.060/sq mi)
- Time zone: UTC+3 (EAT)
- ISO 3166 code: UG-C
- HDI (2019): 0.605 medium · 1st

The Central region is one of the four regions in the country of Uganda. As of Uganda's 2024 census, the region's population was 12,969,646. It is coterminous with the Kingdom of Buganda, one of the ancient African monarchies that are constitutionally recognised in Uganda.

== Districts ==
As of 2020, the Central region contains 26 districts:

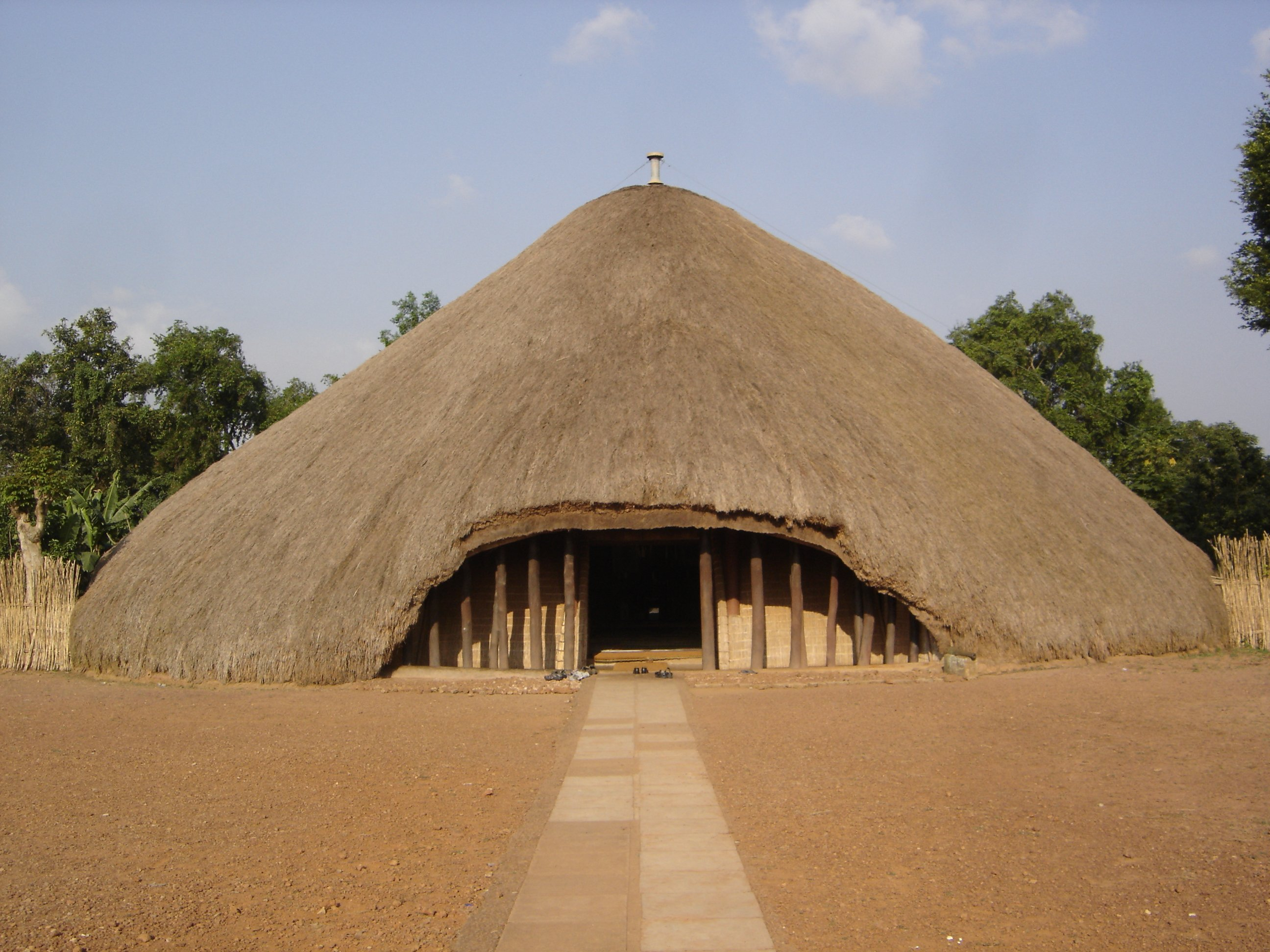
Kampala Kasubi Tombs

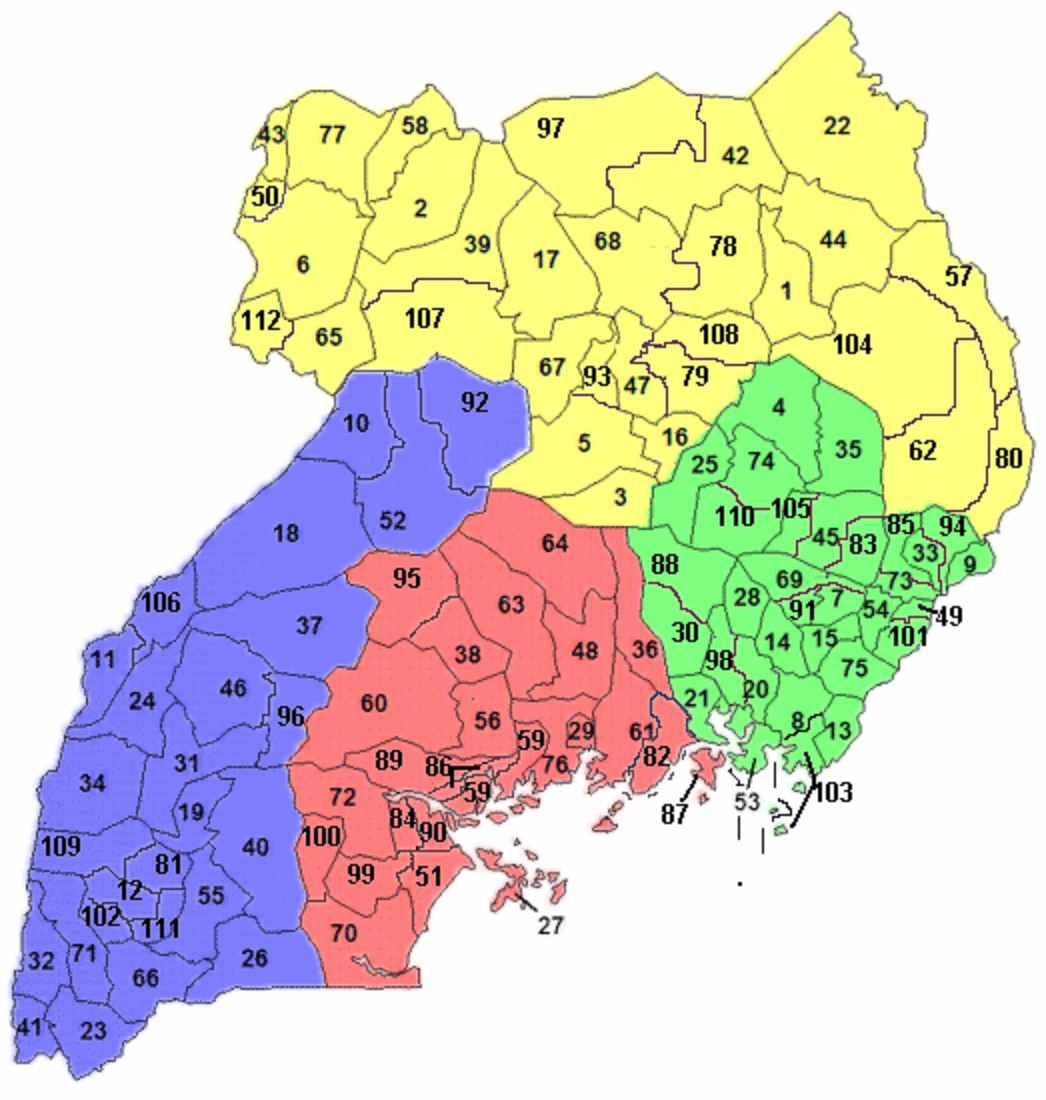
Central region in red.

District	Population (Census 1991)	Population (Census 2002)	Population (Census 2014)	Population (Census 2024)	Map	Chief town
Buikwe	250,511	329,858	422,771	520158	82	Buikwe
Bukomansimbi	126,549	139,556	151,413	197,568	84	Bukomansimbi
Butambala	74,062	86,755	100,840	146,516	86	Gombe
Buvuma	18,482	42,483	89,890	110,832	87	Kitamilo
Gomba	119,550	133,264	159,922	199,120	89	Kanoni
Kalangala	16,371	34,766	54,293	74,411	27	Kalangala
Kalungu	152,028	160,684	183,232	221,569	90	Kalungu
Kampala	774,241	1,189,142	1,507,080	1,797,722	29	Kampala
Kayunga	236,177	294,613	368,062	439,175	36	Kayunga
Kiboga	98,153	108,897	148,218	183,255	38	Kiboga
Kyankwanzi	43,454	120,575	214,693	278,432	95	Kyankwanzi
Luweero	255,390	341,317	456,958	616,242	48	Luweero
Lwengo	212,554	242,252	274,953	325,263	99	Lwengo
Lyantonde	53,100	66,039	93,753	133,017	100	Lyantonde
Masaka	203,566	228,170	297,004	409,621	51	Masaka
Mityana	223,527	266,108	328,964	407,386	56	Mityana
Mpigi	157,368	187,771	250,548	326,690	59	Mpigi
Mubende	277,449	423,422	684,337	522,015	60	Mubende
Mukono	319,434	423,052	596,804	929,224	61	Mukono
Nakaseke	93,804	137,278	197,369	251,398	63	Nakaseke
Nakasongola	100,497	127,064	181,799	226,074	64	Nakasongola
Rakai	330,401	404,326	516,309	346,885	70	Rakai
Sembabule	144,039	180,045	252,597	305,971	72	Sembabule
Wakiso	562,887	907,988	1,997,418	3,411,177	76	Wakiso
Total	4,843,594	6,575,425	9,529,227	12,969,646	-	Kampala

== Economy ==
=== Energy ===
The Central Region's main source of energy is hydroelectricity from the Nnalubaale Power Station in Njeru and the Kiira Hydroelectric Power Station on Lake Nnalubaale (Lake Victoria). Smaller thermal power plants operate in Buganda like the heavy fuel oil-fired Namanve Power Station in Namanve, Mukono District. Small solar power plants like the Kabulasoke Solar Power Station in Kabulasoke, Gomba District operate in Buganda.
