= Foreign relations of Uganda =

Uganda has formal diplomatic relations with many countries, some accredited. Since the colonial era and after independence Uganda has grown to be one of the most important African countries. Uganda has diplomatic relations with many countries throughout Africa, the Americas, Asia, Europe and Oceania. Uganda is a member of the United Nations and the Commonwealth of Nations since 1962.

== Diplomatic relations ==
List of countries which Uganda maintains diplomatic relations with:

#	Country	Date
1	Somalia	1 April 1960
2	Canada	9 October 1962
3	Germany	9 October 1962
4	India	9 October 1962
5	Israel	9 October 1962
6	United Kingdom	9 October 1962
7	United States	9 October 1962
8	Czech Republic	11 October 1962
9	Russia	13 October 1962
10	Sudan	15 October 1962
11	China	18 October 1962
12	France	29 October 1962
13	Rwanda	18 December 1962
14	Democratic Republic of the Congo	4 March 1963
15	South Korea	26 March 1963
16	Poland	8 April 1963
17	Serbia	31 July 1963
18	Ghana	1 August 1963
19	Nigeria	6 September 1963
20	Switzerland	28 February 1964
21	Chile	10 March 1964
22	Japan	1 April 1964
23	Sweden	9 April 1964
24	Netherlands	10 April 1964
25	Bulgaria	17 May 1964
26	Egypt	27 May 1964
27	Ethiopia	4 June 1964
28	Italy	5 July 1964
29	Norway	21 July 1964
30	Mali	4 November 1964
31	Belgium	17 December 1964
32	Republic of the Congo	1964
33	Denmark	26 January 1965
34	Finland	14 June 1965
35	Pakistan	1 August 1965
36	Hungary	13 August 1965
37	Australia	23 August 1965
38	Algeria	1965
39	Morocco	1965
40	Austria	26 January 1966
41	Ivory Coast	21 July 1966
42	Guinea	22 July 1966
—	Holy See	1 September 1966
43	Zambia	1966
44	Liberia	5 April 1967
45	Burundi	25 August 1967
46	Lesotho	4 October 1968
47	Tunisia	9 December 1968
48	Romania	27 April 1969
49	Spain	13 September 1969
50	Turkey	18 September 1969
51	Brazil	22 December 1969
52	Senegal	8 April 1970
53	Venezuela	27 April 1970
54	Guyana	21 July 1970
55	Greece	12 October 1971
56	Botswana	1971
57	Libya	13 February 1972
58	Saudi Arabia	26 June 1972
59	Jordan	27 June 1972
60	Kuwait	28 June 1972
61	Syria	29 June 1972
62	North Korea	2 August 1972
63	Cameroon	August 1972
64	Sri Lanka	30 November 1972
65	Vietnam	9 February 1973
66	Iraq	25 July 1973
67	Sierra Leone	10 September 1973
68	Yemen	17 December 1973
69	Eswatini	23 January 1974
70	Cuba	9 May 1974
71	Trinidad and Tobago	5 June 1974
72	Argentina	17 June 1974
73	Iran	12 October 1974
74	Niger	8 April 1975
75	Gabon	4 July 1975
76	Mozambique	21 August 1975
77	Qatar	1975
78	Mauritania	3 February 1976
79	Mexico	20 February 1976
80	Burkina Faso	26 May 1976
81	Mauritius	18 June 1976
82	Chad	8 September 1976
83	Gambia	16 November 1976
84	Cyprus	1 February 1977
85	Central African Republic	13 June 1977
86	Djibouti	June 1977
87	Luxembourg	30 September 1977
88	Bangladesh	25 November 1977
89	Kenya	8 February 1978
90	Benin	1978
91	Guinea-Bissau	1980
94	Tanzania	15 December 1981
92	Malawi	1981
93	Antigua and Barbuda	2 March 1983
95	Thailand	15 February 1985
—	Sahrawi Arab Democratic Republic	7 July 1986
96	Oman	1987
97	Indonesia	12 January 1989
—	State of Palestine	15 February 1989
98	Bolivia	3 May 1989
99	Colombia	5 May 1989
100	Namibia	1990–1992
101	Portugal	2 December 1991
102	Seychelles	6 April 1992
103	Slovakia	1 January 1993
104	Bahrain	2 October 1993
105	Maldives	30 November 1993
106	Eritrea	28 January 1994
107	South Africa	24 June 1994
108	Ireland	14 July 1994
109	Ukraine	7 September 1994
110	Azerbaijan	19 August 1995
111	Singapore	1 June 1998
112	Belarus	2 October 1998
113	Malaysia	8 December 1998
114	Croatia	10 March 1999
115	Turkmenistan	5 August 1999
116	North Macedonia	26 July 2000
117	Angola	June 2001
118	Brunei	21 October 2003
119	Philippines	12 December 2003
120	Iceland	22 June 2004
121	Malta	21 July 2004
122	Saint Vincent and the Grenadines	27 July 2004
123	Zimbabwe	31 July 2004
124	Tajikistan	8 September 2005
125	Slovenia	31 August 2006
126	Estonia	19 September 2006
127	New Zealand	1 November 2006
128	Bahamas	9 August 2007
129	Costa Rica	29 August 2007
130	Dominican Republic	22 October 2007
131	United Arab Emirates	2007
132	Andorra	11 March 2008
133	Kazakhstan	20 June 2008
134	Paraguay	18 June 2010
135	Bosnia and Herzegovina	3 December 2010
136	Georgia	9 December 2010
137	Montenegro	14 July 2011
138	Jamaica	21 September 2011
139	Lithuania	15 March 2012
140	South Sudan	3 September 2012
141	Armenia	28 June 2013
142	Fiji	16 September 2013
143	Latvia	1 October 2013
144	Mongolia	20 November 2013
145	Kyrgyzstan	19 March 2014
146	Nepal	12 June 2017
147	El Salvador	22 September 2017
148	Equatorial Guinea	19 February 2018
149	Comoros	24 October 2018
150	Lebanon	5 March 2019
151	Nicaragua	7 June 2019
152	Togo	5 December 2019
153	Cambodia	23 January 2020
154	Moldova	23 October 2020
155	San Marino	23 October 2020
156	Dominica	4 May 2021
157	Peru	4 June 2021
158	Laos	27 September 2021
159	Saint Kitts and Nevis	1 April 2022
160	Panama	22 September 2023
161	Solomon Islands	27 November 2023
162	Uzbekistan	18 January 2024
163	Tonga	15 April 2024
164	Belize	20 May 2024
165	Timor-Leste	13 August 2024
166	Samoa	7 March 2025
167	Uruguay	26 May 2026
168	Madagascar	Unknown

== Bilateral relations ==
=== Africa ===
Country	Formal Relations Began	Notes
Kenya	8 February 1978	See Kenya–Uganda relations Diplomatic relations were established on 8 February 1978 From 1961 to 1965 the two states, along with Tanzania, were united in the East African Common Services Organization, a common market with a loose federal structure.: Kenya has a high commission in Kampala.; Uganda has a high commission in Nairobi.
South Sudan	3 September 2012	See South Sudan–Uganda relations
Tanzania	13 December 1983	See Tanzania–Uganda relations

=== Americas ===
Country	Formal Relations Began	Notes
Mexico	20 February 1976	See Mexico–Uganda relations Diplomatic relations were established on 20 February 1976: Mexico is accredited to Uganda from its embassy in Nairobi, Kenya and maintains an honorary consulate in Kampala.; Uganda is accredited to Mexico from its embassy in Washington, D.C., United States.
United States	9 October 1962	See Uganda–United States relations Diplomatic relations were established on 9 October 1962: Uganda has an embassy in Washington, D.C.; The United States has an embassy in Kampala.

=== Asia ===
Country	Formal Relations Began	Notes
Bangladesh	25 November 1977	see Bangladesh–Uganda relations Diplomatic relations were established on 25 November 1977 Bangladesh has an honorary consulate in Kampala.
China	18 October 1962	See China–Uganda relations Diplomatic relations were established on 18 October 1962: China has an embassy in Kampala.; Uganda has an embassy in Beijing.
India	9 October 1962	See India–Uganda relations Diplomatic relations were established on 9 October 1962 when the Indian Mission in Kampala has been raised to the level of a High Commission: India has a High Commission in Kampala.; Uganda maintains a High Commission in New Delhi.
Israel	9 October 1962	See Israel–Uganda relations Diplomatic relations were established on 9 October 1962. Uganda severance relations with Israel on 30 March 1972. Diplomatic relations re-established on 29 July 1994. Ugandas relations with Israel remain uneasily strained due to Operation Entebbe, the operation Israel performed to rescue hostages from the 1976 capturing of a French airliner hijacked by the Palestinian Liberation Organization and flown to Entebbe airport.
Malaysia	1995	See Malaysia–Uganda relations Diplomatic relations were established in 1995 when has been accredited High Commissioner-Designate of Uganda to Malaysia (resident in New Delhi) Dr. Oboth Okumu. Malaysia does not yet have a high commission in Kampala, while Uganda has an embassy in Kuala Lumpur and Uganda high commission in Kuala Lumpur were also accredited to Brunei Darussalam, Indonesia, Philippines, Thailand, Vietnam, Lao PDR, Cambodia and Myanmar.
Maldives	30 November 1993	Diplomatic relations were established on 30 November 1993; Both countries are full members of Commonwealth of Nations.
Nepal	12 June 2017	Diplomatic relations were established on 12 June 2017.; Both countries are Landlocked developing countries.
South Korea	26 March 1963	Establishment of diplomatic relations between the Republic of Korea (South Korea) and the Republic of Uganda was on March 26, 1963; South Korea has an embassy in Kampala, which was reopened in 2011.
Turkey	18 September 1969	See Turkey–Uganda relations Diplomatic relations were established on 18 September 1969: Uganda has an embassy in Ankara.; Turkey has an embassy in Kampala.; Trade volume between the two countries was US$40 million in 2018.
Vietnam	9 February 1973	Diplomatic relations were established on 9 February 1973.; Vietnam is accredited to Uganda, through its embassy in Dar es Salaam, Tanzania. Vietnam also maintains an honorary consulate in Kampala.

=== Europe ===
Country	Formal Relations Began	Notes
Austria	26 January 1966	Since 2012, Austria is represented in Uganda by its embassy in Addis Ababa, Ethiopia and an honorary consulate in Kampala.; Uganda is represented in Austria by its embassy in Berlin, Germany and in Vienna.
Cyprus	1 February 1977	Both countries have established diplomatic relations and have signed an Agreement for Cooperation in the Field of Tourism.; Both countries are full members of Commonwealth of Nations.
Denmark	26 January 1965	See Denmark–Uganda relations
Germany	9 October 1962	See Germany–Uganda relations Diplomatic relations were established on 9 October 1962: Germany has an embassy in Kampala.; Uganda has an embassy in Berlin.
Hungary	13 August 1965	Diplomatic relations were established on 13 August 1965: Hungary is represented in Uganda by its embassy in Nairobi, Kenya and an honorary consulate in Kampala.; Hungary is realizing the largest foreign development program in its history in Uganda.
Iceland	2000	Diplomatic relations were established in 2000; Iceland has an embassy in Uganda.; Uganda is represented in Iceland by its embassy in Copenhagen, Denmark.
Netherlands	1965	The Netherlands have an embassy in Kampala.; Uganda is represented in The Netherlands by its embassy in Brussels, Belgium.
Poland	8 April 1963	See Poland–Uganda relations
Russia	13 October 1962	See Russia–Uganda relations Diplomatic relations were established on 13 October 1962: Russia has an embassy in Kampala.; Uganda has an embassy in Moscow.
Ukraine	7 September 1994	Diplomatic relations were established on 7 September 1994: Uganda is represented in Ukraine by its embassy in Moscow, Russia.; Ukraine is represented in Uganda by its embassy in Nairobi, Kenya.
United Kingdom	9 October 1962	See Uganda–United Kingdom relations The UK established diplomatic relations with the United Kingdom on 9 October 1962.: Uganda maintains a high commission in London.; The United Kingdom is accredited to Uganda through its high commission in Kampala.; The UK governed Uganda from 1894 to 1962, when Uganda achieved full independence. Both countries share common membership of the Commonwealth, and the World Trade Organization. Bilaterally the two countries have a Development Partnership, and an Investment Agreement.

== International organisations ==
Uganda has been a member of the United Nations and the Commonwealth of Nations since independence in 1962.

== See also ==
- Foreign support of Uganda in the Uganda–Tanzania War
- Ministry of Foreign Affairs (Uganda)
- List of diplomatic missions in Uganda
- List of diplomatic missions of Uganda
- Ugandan diaspora
