= Kosovo–Uganda relations =

Kosovar–Ugandan relations
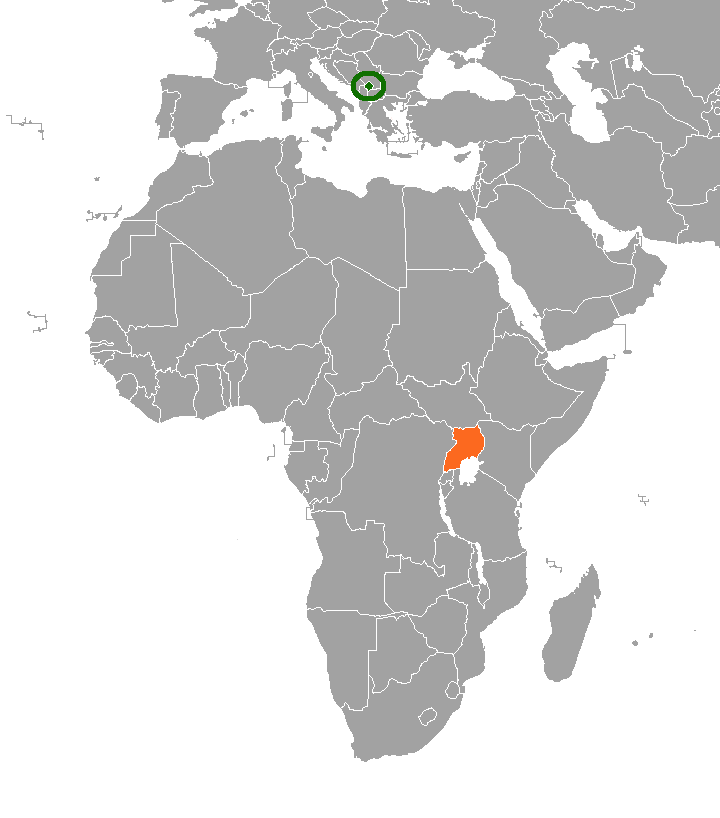
- Kosovo: Uganda

Kosovar–Ugandan relations are foreign relations between Kosovo and Uganda. Formal diplomatic relations between two states have not been established as Uganda has not recognized Kosovo as a sovereign state.

== History ==
In February 2008, a senior Ugandan official said that the Ugandan government was carefully studying Kosovo's declaration of independence before it makes a decision to recognise it as a state or not. In March 2009, Ruhakana Rugunda, the Ambassador of Uganda to the United Nations, said that Uganda would in time take "the optimal decision" about recognizing Kosovo.

In August 2011, Ugandan Foreign Minister Sam Kutesa wrote to Kosovo's Deputy Prime Minister Behgjet Pacolli promising to review the request for recognition in line with the International Court of Justice decision. In February 2012 Kosovo's Minister of Foreign Affairs announced that Uganda had recognised their independence, citing a note verbale dated 5 December 2011 from Uganda's President Yoweri Museveni which expressed congratulations "on the advancement towards your country's independence" and that "we are behind other nations that have recognized the Republic of Kosovo". Serbian Foreign Minister Vuk Jeremić responded that Ugandan State Foreign Minister Henry Oryem Okello had informed him that the recognition never took place.

In January 2013, former Foreign Minister of Kosovo Skënder Hyseni said that the recognitions by Nigeria and Uganda were "contested, not only by the respective states, but also by the US State Department". Current Foreign Minister, Enver Hoxhaj, stated that he is certain that the number of recognitions is valid.

In an article posted in June 2014, Kosovo's Ministry of Foreign Affairs listed Uganda as a state that had not recognised Kosovo.

== See also ==
- Foreign relations of Kosovo
- Foreign relations of Uganda
