= Joan Rwabyomere =

- Citizenship: Uganda
- Education: Master of Laws(Hons) Makerere University
- Employer: Uganda
- Organization: Electricity Regulatory Authority
- Title: Ambassador
- Children: Four Children

Joan Rwabyomere is a Ugandan lawyer, business woman and diplomat who was the Uganda's High Commissioner to London and Nigeria.She is currently a board member of the Electricity Regulatory Authority (ERA).

== Education ==
Rwabyomere earned a Master of Laws(Hons) from Makerere University, Master’s Degree in International Trade and Investment and a Masters of Business Administration in Oil and Gas Management.

== Career ==
Rwabyomere was the deputy Director General of the External Security Organisation (ESO) before being appointed as Uganda’s High Commissioner to London (2006 – 2013), and to Nigeria (2000 – 2005).

She was the Kabarole women representative in the National Resistance Council (1989–1996), Minister of State for Agriculture (1995–1996), Director, Uganda Electricity Board (1989–1995); Chairman, Board of Directors, Uganda Civil Aviation Authority (1989–1995),board member Women in Diplomatic Service, National Enterprise Corporation and Electricity Regulatory Authority; Delegate to the EU–ACP Joint Assembly (1989–1995).

== Controversies ==
Rwabyomere reportedly refused NRM party members from using a hall in Uganda House(London) to hold celebrations marking 24 years of their rule in 2010. She is also alleged to have deployed her relative at the High Commission.

== See also ==
- Joyce Kakuramatsi Kikafunda
