= List of diplomatic missions of Uganda =

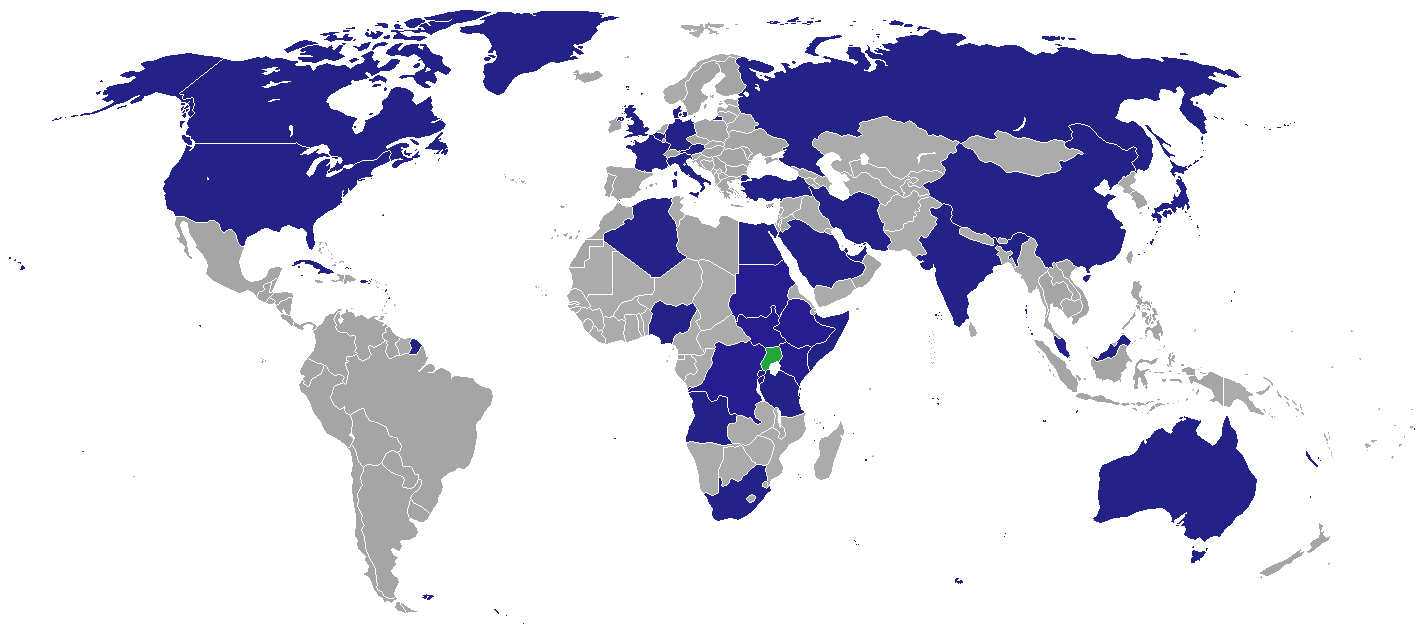
Map of Ugandan diplomatic missions

The Ministry of Foreign Affairs of Uganda maintains diplomatic missions with its immediate neighbours, what it calls the 'ring states'. Further afield Uganda has a presence in Europe, the Middle East, North America and the Pacific-Rim.

== Current missions ==
=== Africa ===
Host country	Host city	Mission	Concurrent accreditation	Ref.
Algeria	Algiers	Embassy	Countries: Mauritania; Tunisia	
Angola	Luanda	Embassy		
Burundi	Bujumbura	Embassy		
Congo-Kinshasa	Kinshasa	Embassy	Countries: Cameroon; Central African Republic; Congo-Brazzaville; Gabon	
Congo-Kinshasa	Goma	Liaison office (Note: To be upgraded into a consulate.)	Countries: Cameroon; Central African Republic; Congo-Brazzaville; Gabon	
Egypt	Cairo	Embassy	Countries: Israel; Lebanon; Syria	
Ethiopia	Addis Ababa	Embassy	Countries: Djibouti; International Organizations: African Union; Intergovernmental Authority on Development; United Nations Economic Commission for Africa	
Kenya	Nairobi	High Commission	Countries: Seychelles; International Organizations: United Nations; United Nations Environment Programme; United Nations Human Settlements Programme	
Kenya	Mombasa	Consulate-General	Countries: Seychelles; International Organizations: United Nations; United Nations Environment Programme; United Nations Human Settlements Programme	
Nigeria	Abuja	High Commission	Countries: Benin; Burkina Faso; Cape Verde; Equatorial Guinea; Gambia; Ghana; Guinea; Guinea-Bissau; Ivory Coast; Liberia; Mali; Niger; Senegal; Sierra Leone; Togo	
Rwanda	Kigali	High Commission		
Somalia	Mogadishu	Embassy		
South Africa	Pretoria	High Commission	Countries: Botswana; Eswatini; Lesotho; Namibia; Zimbabwe	
South Sudan	Juba	Embassy		
Sudan	Khartoum	Embassy	Countries: Chad; Eritrea; Morocco	
Tanzania	Dar Es Salaam	High Commission	Countries: Comoros; Madagascar; Malawi; Mauritius; Mozambique; Zambia; International Organizations: Common Market for Eastern and Southern Africa; East African Community	
Tanzania	Arusha	Consulate	Countries: Comoros; Madagascar; Malawi; Mauritius; Mozambique; Zambia; International Organizations: Common Market for Eastern and Southern Africa; East African Community	

=== Americas ===
Host country	Host city	Mission	Concurrent accreditation	Ref.
Canada	Ottawa	High Commission	Countries: Bahamas	
Cuba	Havana	Embassy		
United States	Washington, D.C.	Embassy	Countries: Argentina; Bolivia; Brazil; Chile; Colombia; Ecuador; Jamaica; Mexico; Paraguay; Peru; Trinidad & Tobago; Uruguay; Venezuela	

=== Asia ===
Host country	Host city	Mission	Concurrent accreditation	Ref.
China	Beijing	Embassy		
China	Guangzhou	Consulate-General		
India	New Delhi	High Commission	Countries: Bangladesh; Maldives; Nepal; Sri Lanka; Singapore	
Iran	Tehran	Embassy	Countries: Afghanistan; Armenia; Azerbaijan; Iraq; Kyrgyzstan; Pakistan; Palestine; Tajikistan; Turkmenistan	
Japan	Tokyo	Embassy	Countries: South Korea; Timor-Leste	
Malaysia	Kuala Lumpur	High Commission	Countries: Brunei; Cambodia; Indonesia; Laos; Myanmar; Philippines; Thailand; Vietnam	
Qatar	Doha	Embassy		
Saudi Arabia	Riyadh	Embassy	Countries: Bahrain; Jordan; Kuwait; Oman; Yemen; International Organizations: Organisation of Islamic Cooperation	
United Arab Emirates	Abu Dhabi	Embassy	International Organizations: International Renewable Energy Agency	
Turkey	Ankara	Embassy		

=== Europe ===
Host country	Host city	Mission	Concurrent accreditation	Ref.
Austria	Vienna	Embassy	International Organizations: International Atomic Energy Agency	
Belgium	Brussels	Embassy	Countries: Luxembourg; Netherlands; International Organizations: European Union; Organisation of African, Caribbean and Pacific States; Organisation for the Prohibition of Chemical Weapons	
Denmark	Copenhagen	Embassy	Countries: Estonia; Finland; Iceland; Latvia; Norway; Sweden	
France	Paris	Embassy	Countries: Portugal; Spain; International Organizations: OECD; UNESCO; World Organisation for Animal Health; World Tourism Organization	
Germany	Berlin	Embassy	Countries: Bulgaria; Czechia; Holy See; Hungary; Poland; Romania; Slovakia; Ukraine; International Organizations: CTBTO Preparatory Commission; UNIDO; United Nations Office on Drugs and Crime; UNCITRAL; UNOOSA	
Italy	Rome	Embassy	Countries: Albania; Bosnia and Herzegovina; Croatia; Cyprus; Greece; Malta; Montenegro; North Macedonia; Serbia; Slovenia; International Organizations: Food and Agriculture Organization; International Fund for Agricultural Development; World Food Programme	
Russia	Moscow	Embassy	Countries: Belarus; Georgia; Kazakhstan; Moldova; Mongolia; Uzbekistan	
United Kingdom	London	High Commission	Countries: Ireland	

=== Oceania ===
Host country	Host city	Mission	Concurrent accreditation	Ref.
Australia	Canberra	High Commission	Countries: Fiji; New Zealand; Papua New Guinea; Solomon Islands	

=== Multilateral organisations ===
Organization	Host city	Host country	Mission	Concurrent accreditation	Ref.
United Nations	New York City	United States	Permanent Mission		
United Nations	Geneva	Switzerland	Permanent Mission	Countries: Switzerland; International Organizations: Conference on Disarmament; International Organization for Migration; World Health Organization; World Intellectual Property Organization; World Trade Organization	

== Gallery ==
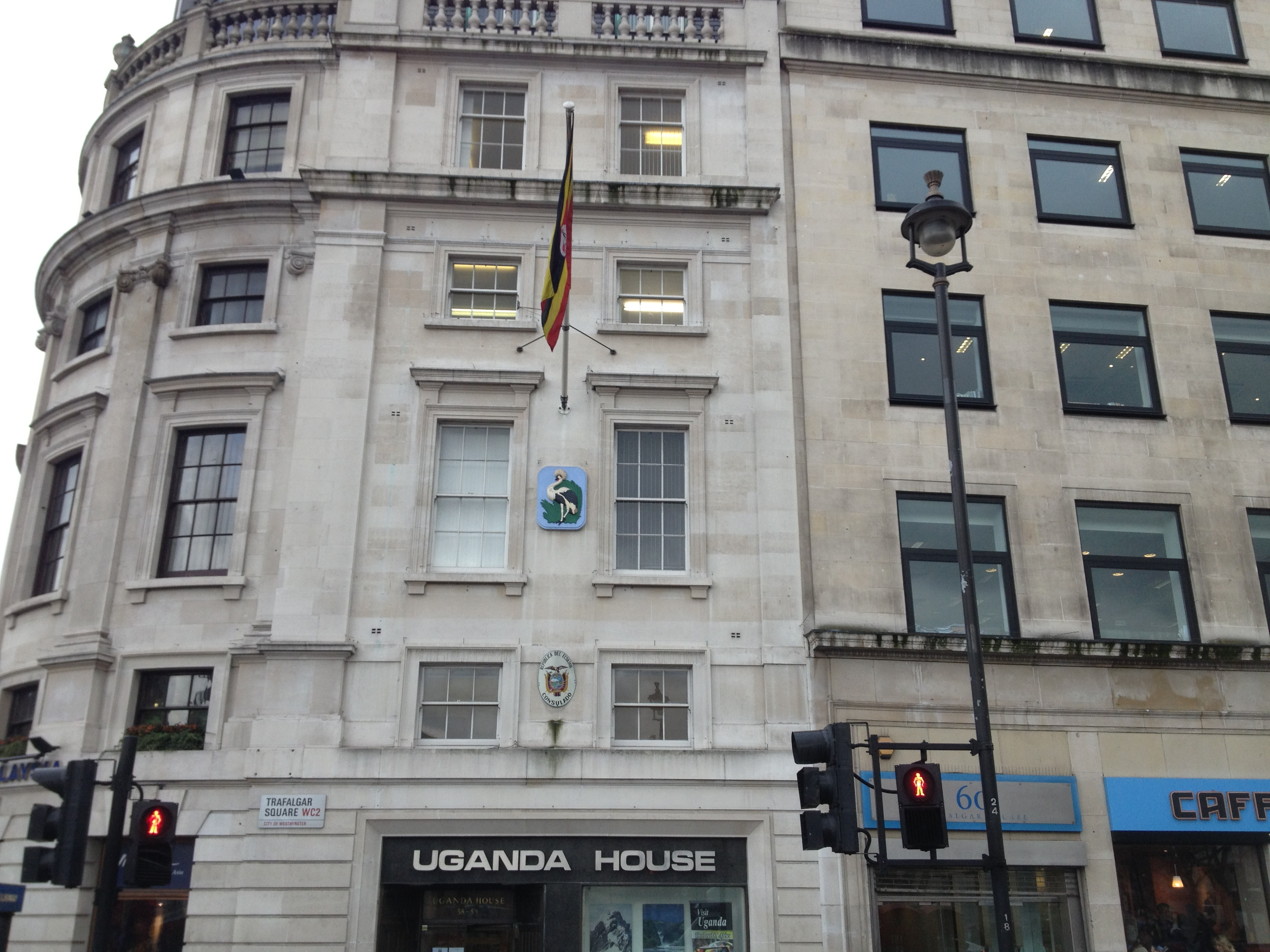
High Commission in London

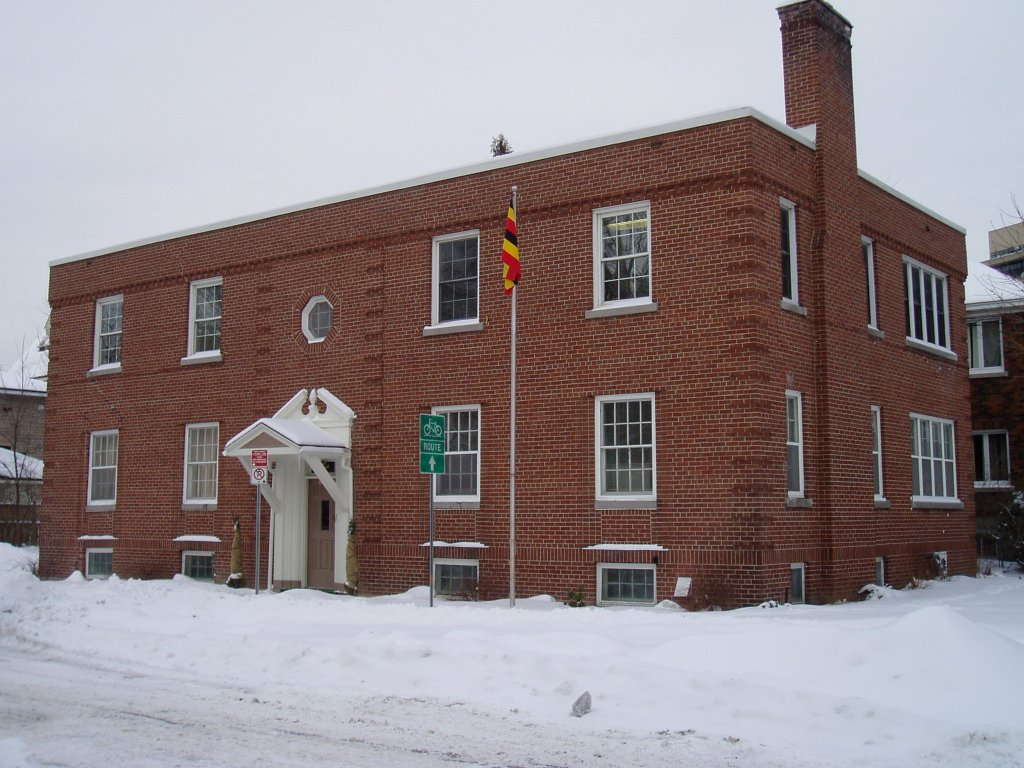
High Commission in Ottawa

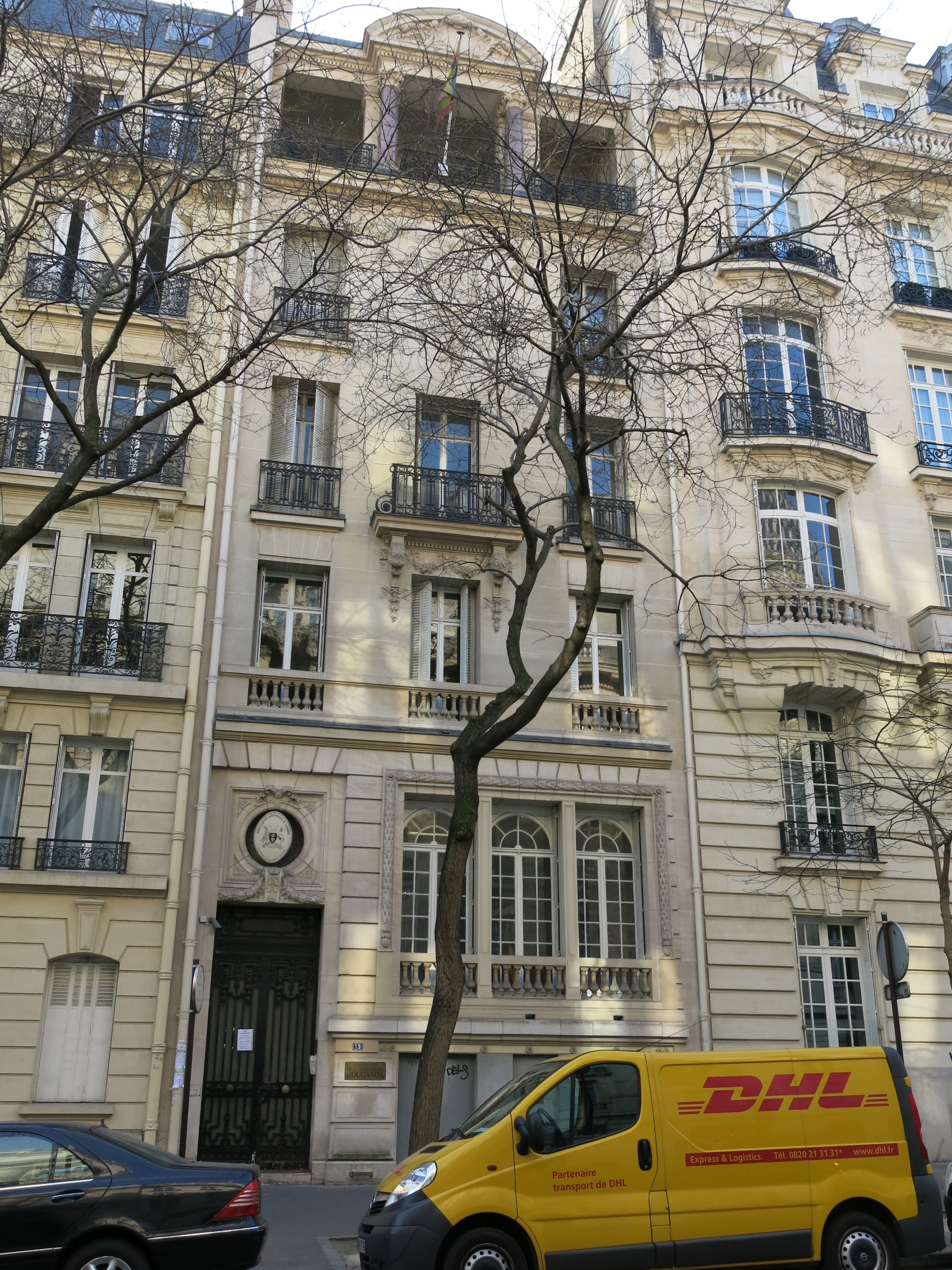
Embassy in Paris

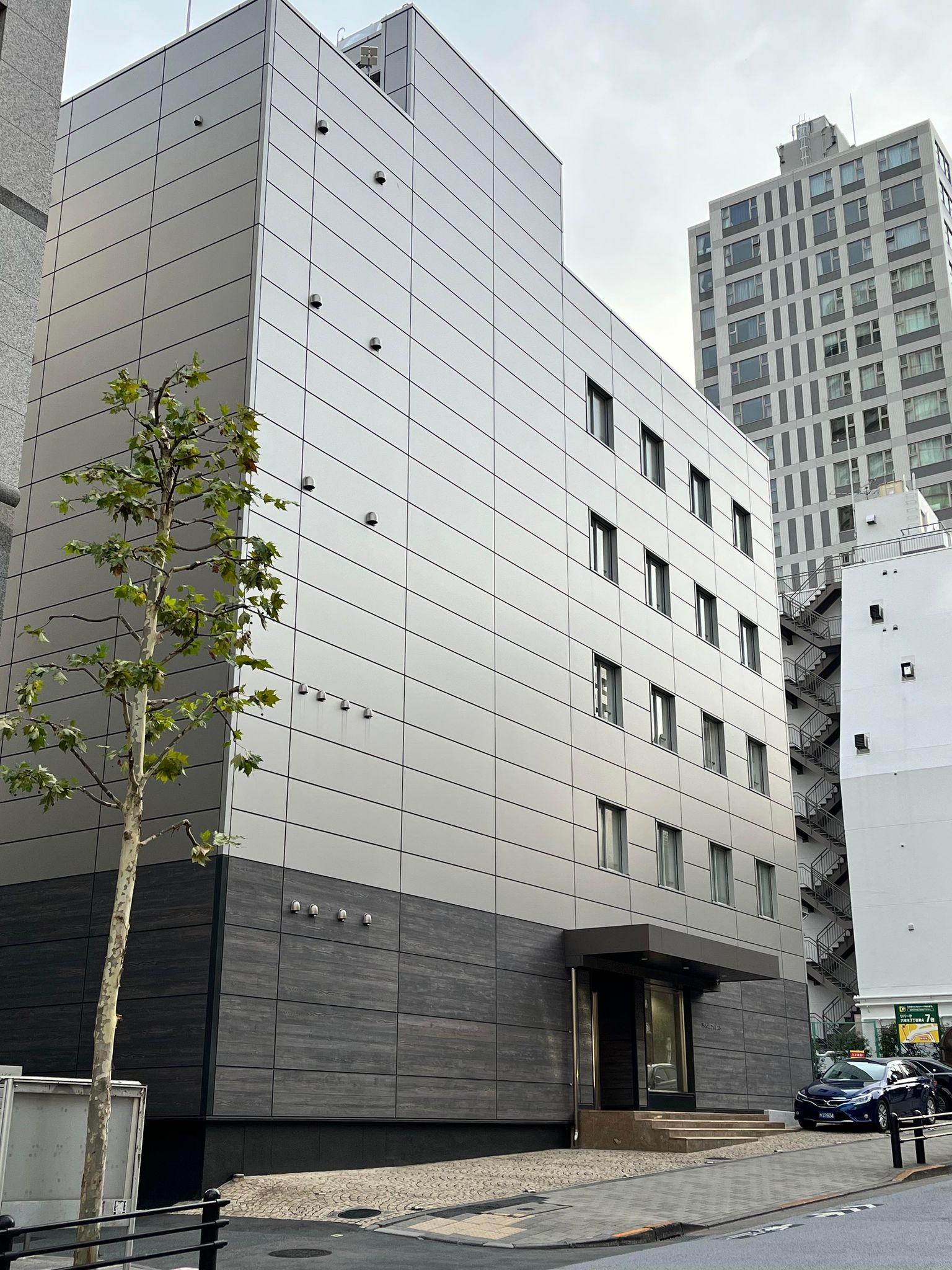
Embassy in Tokyo

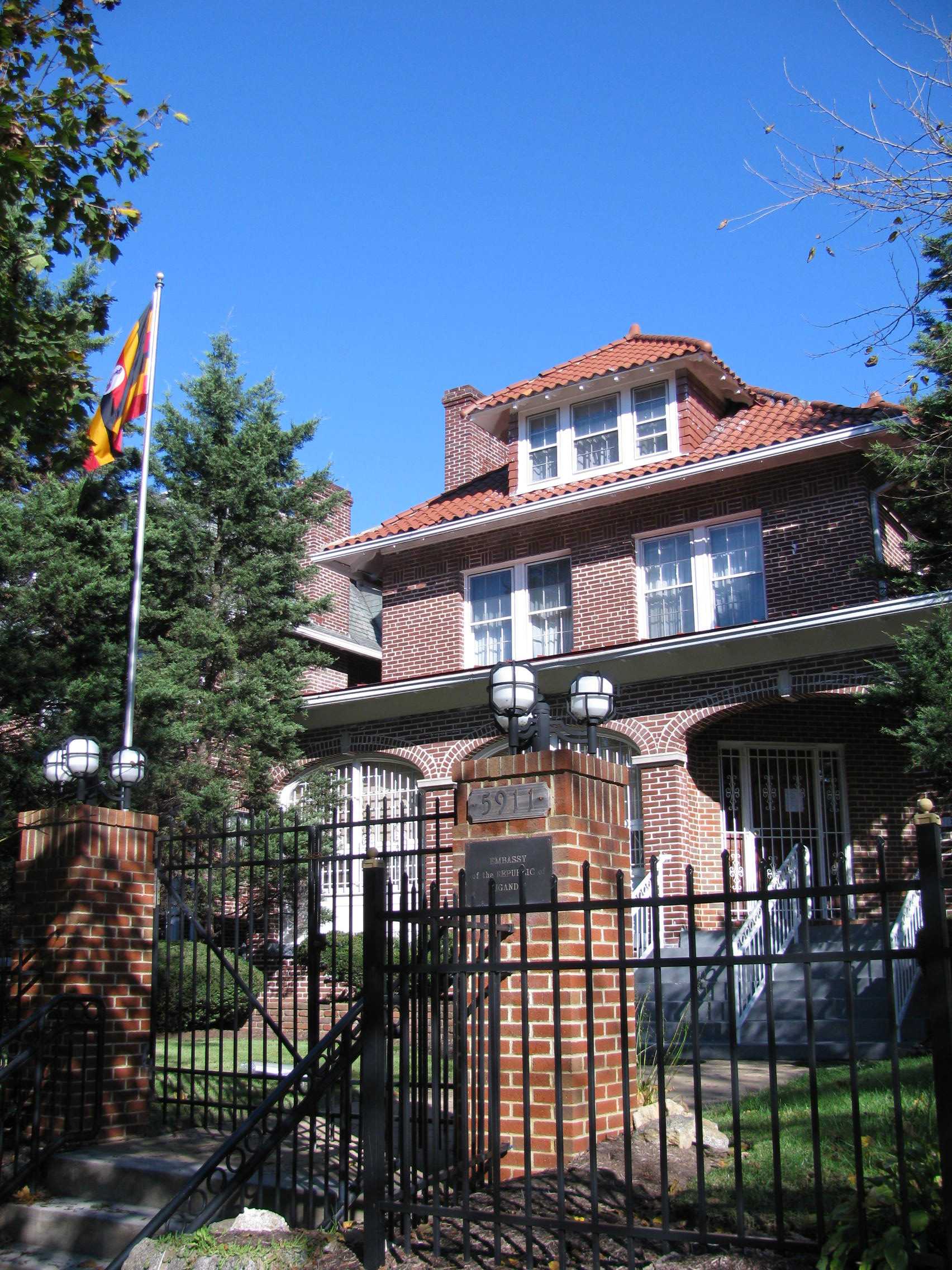
Embassy in Washington, D.C.

== Missions to open ==
- Israel
  - Jerusalem (Embassy)

== Closed missions ==
=== Africa ===
Host country	Host city	Mission	Year closed	Ref.
Congo-Kinshasa	Goma	Consulate	2000	
Libya	Tripoli	Embassy	Unknown	

== See also ==
- Foreign relations of Uganda
- List of diplomatic missions in Uganda
- Visa policy of Uganda
