= Ugandans in India =

Ethnic group

- (Uganda) (India)
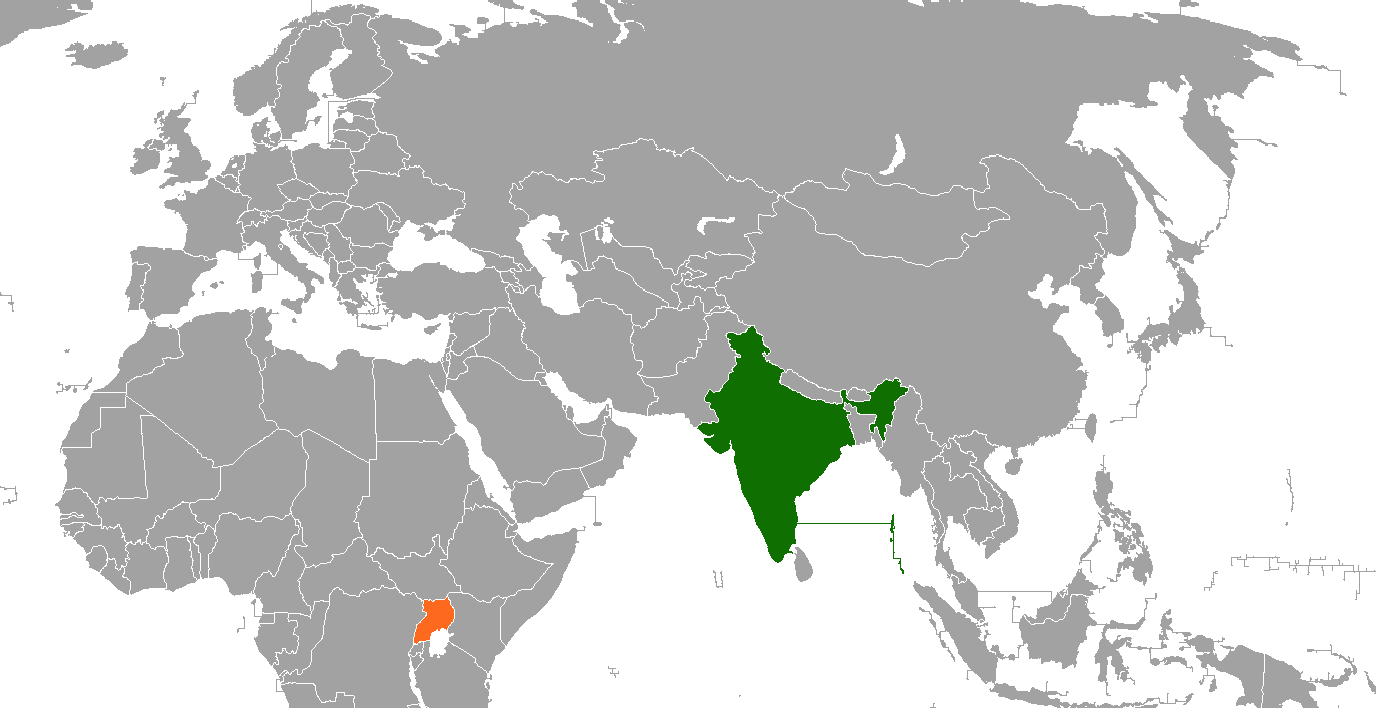

Total population
- 1,000

Regions with significant populations
- New Delhi; Mumbai; Hyderabad; Bangalore; Visakhapatnam; Raipur; Ahmedabad; Ludhaina; Jaipur; Bhubaneswar; Kolkata; Ranchi; Lucknow; Patna; Chennai

Languages
- English; Gujarati; Telugu; Tamil

Religion
- Hinduism; Islam; Sikhism; Catholicism

Related ethnic groups
- Indians in Uganda; Siddi

There is a small community of Ugandans in India consisting largely but not exclusively of Ugandans of Indian descent.

== Migration History ==
Immigration from Uganda to India began in the 1970s when Idi Amin, President of Uganda, gave Uganda's Asians (mostly Gujaratis of Indian origin) 90 days to leave the country, following an alleged dream in which, he claimed, God told him to expel them. In addition, Amin was eloquent in defending the expulsion in terms of giving Uganda back to the ethnic Ugandans. About a thousand Ugandan Asians fled to India after the expulsion as well as other countries such as Canada, Kenya, Pakistan, West Germany, Malawi, and the United States.

There are over 800 Ugandan students in India, which has emerged as a preferred destination for higher studies among African nations. Kampala is keen to sign a pact with New Delhi to make it easier for study visas and short-term job permits.

== In popular culture ==
- The 1976 Bollywood film, Charas focuses on an Ugandan Indian moving to India due to the expulsion.
- In the 2009 Bollywood movie 3 Idiots, the comedic character Chatur Ramalingam or "The Silencer" (played by Omi Vaidya) is portrayed as a college nerd who is an ethnic Tamil born in Uganda.

== Notable people ==
- Shimit Amin - Indian film director
- Supra Singhal - Ugandan swimmer

== See also ==
- India–Uganda relations
