= India–Uganda relations =

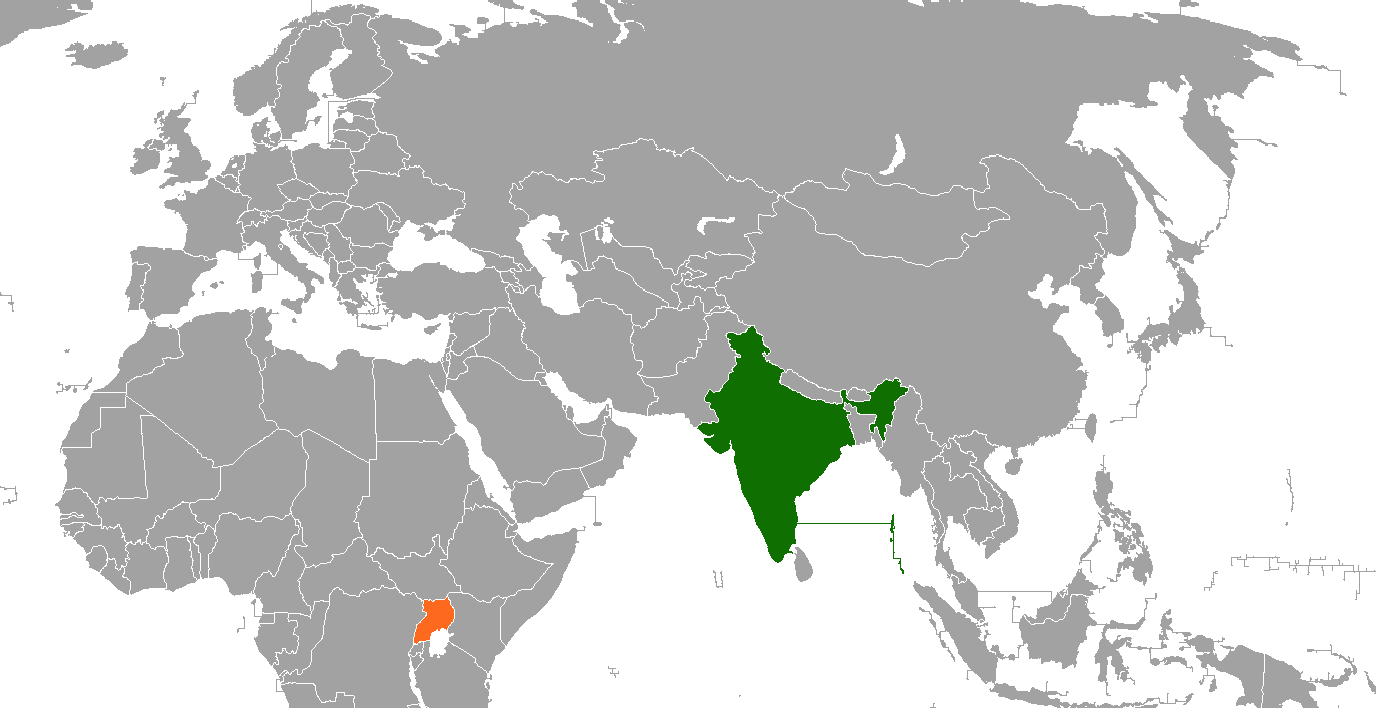
- India: Uganda

India–Uganda relations are bilateral relations between the Republic of India and the Republic of Uganda. India and Uganda established diplomatic relations in 1965 and each maintain a High Commission in the other's capital. The Indian High Commission in Kampala has concurrent accreditation to Burundi. Uganda hosts a large Indian community and India–Uganda relations cover a broad range of sectors including political, economic, commercial, cultural and scientific cooperation.

== History ==
Relations between India and Uganda began with the arrival of over 30,000 Indians in Uganda in the 19th century who were brought there to construct the Mombasa–Kampala railway line. Ugandan independence activists were inspired in their struggle for Ugandan independence by the success of the Indian freedom struggle and were also supported in their struggle by Indian Prime Minister Jawaharlal Nehru. Indo-Ugandan relations have been good since Uganda's independence, except during the regime of Idi Amin. Amin in 1972 expelled over 55,000 persons of Indian origin and 5,000 Indians who had largely formed the commercial and economic backbone of the country, accusing them of exploiting native Ugandans. Since the mid-1980s when President Yoweri Museveni came to power, relations have steadily improved. Today, some 20,000 Indians and PIOs live or work in Uganda. Ethnic tensions between Indians and Ugandans have been a recurring issue in bilateral relations given the role of Indians in the Ugandan economy.

== Economic relations ==
Indians and persons of Indian origin play a key role in the Ugandan economy in the manufacturing, trade and service sectors. Indian businesses employ thousands of Ugandans and are among the largest taxpayers in Uganda. Traditionally, Indians in Uganda were traders of Gujarati descent. Immigrants from Punjab and healthcare workers from Kerala have also arrived in Uganda in recent years. Since the 1980s, India has emerged as one of the largest investors and trading partners of Uganda.

Bilateral trade between the two countries amounted to $728 million in 2010–11, with the balance of trade heavily in India's favour with Ugandan exports to India accounting for only $16.7 million of the total trade. Uganda imports almost 30% of its pharmaceuticals from India while India emerged the second largest source of Foreign Direct Investments for Uganda in 2011. Firms run by PIO families and PIO business groups, such as the Madhvani, Mehta, Mukwano and Ruparelia, are among the largest in Uganda, while Indian companies, such as Tata Coffee, Bank of Baroda and Airtel, have a significant presence in Uganda.

== Technical cooperation ==
Since Uganda's independence, India has been an important destination for higher education for Ugandan students. Several top Ugandan politicians including former prime minister Kintu Musoke and deputy prime minister Kirunda Kivejinja have studied in India. Since the 1960s, under the Indian Technical and Economic Cooperation Programme, Ugandan officials, scientists and other professionals have attended training courses in India. Following the India–Africa Forum Summits in New Delhi and Addis Ababa, India has decided to establish three key institutions in Uganda – the India-Africa Institute of Foreign Trade, the Food Processing Business Incubation Centre and the Material Testing Laboratory. Uganda has been linked to the Pan-African e-Network project being undertaken by India allowing it to access Indian expertise through telemedicine and tele-education. Uganda has also benefited from India's Focus Africa Initiative and its New Economic Partnership for Africa's Development which have set aside over $200 million for Africa's economic development.

== See also ==
- Protectorate of Uganda
- Queen of Uganda
- Indians in Uganda
- Hinduism in Uganda
- India House, London
- High Commission of Uganda, London
- Embassy of Uganda, Washington, D.C.
- Uganda-United States relations
- Bangladesh-Uganda relations
