= Denmark–Uganda relations =

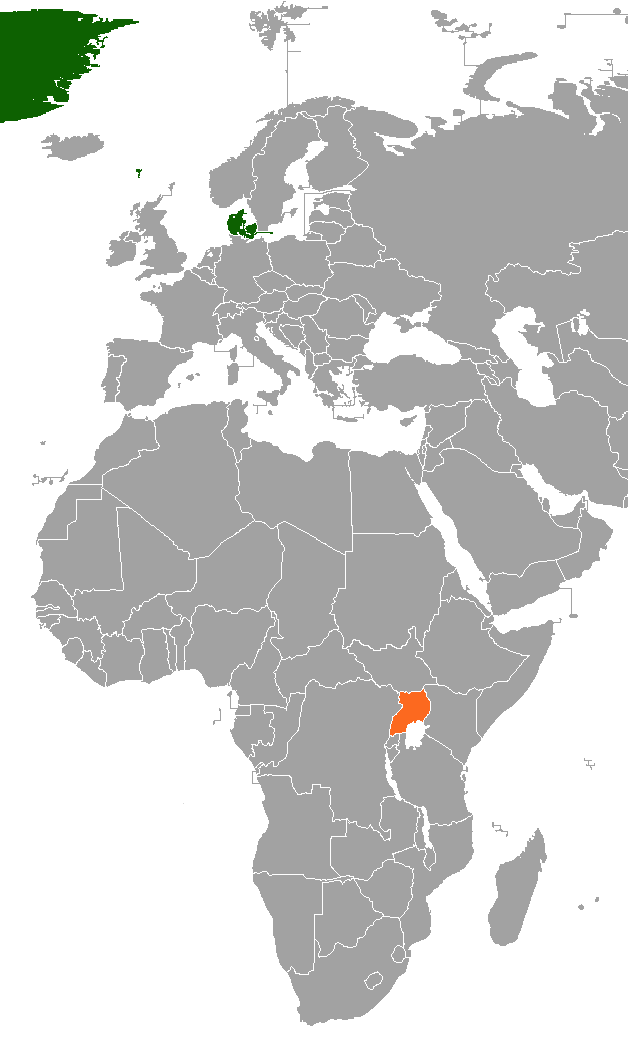
- Denmark: Uganda

Denmark–Uganda relations are foreign relations between Denmark and Uganda. Denmark has an embassy in Kampala, and Uganda has an embassy in Copenhagen. Diplomatic relations were established on 1 April 1968. On 12 November 1971, Denmark and Uganda signed a treaty on a Danish Government loan to Uganda. Bilateral relations between Denmark and Uganda are described as strong.

After the signing of the Uganda Anti-Homosexuality Act, 2014, 50 million DKK a year of Danish subsidies were rerouted away from the Ugandan government and towards civil organizations, with plans to do the same for all 310 million.

== Assistance ==
Uganda is a Danish programme country. From the 1990s to 2000s, Denmark has helped increased the quality of water in Uganda.

Denmark supports good governance and human development. The assistance began in 2001.

== Trade ==
All imports from Uganda to Denmark are duty-free and quota-free, with the exception of armaments, as part of the Everything but Arms initiative of the European Union.

== Controversy ==
The efficiency of the aid is under debate and the support through the European Union of the Democratic Governance Facility had to be stopped. Marco de Swart of DGF was declared Persona-non-Grata after the tried to set up support for election monitoring for the 14 January 2021 election. On 30 January 2023 the Danish ambassador Signe Albjerg visited the Ugandan Human Rights Commission, that has been accused of downplaying human rights abuses in Uganda, and was heavily criticked for this.

== See also ==
- Foreign relations of Denmark
- Foreign relations of Uganda
