= Russia–Uganda relations =

Relations between Uganda and Russia

- Russia: Uganda

Diplomatic mission
- Embassy in Kampala: Embassy in Moscow

Envoy
- Ambassador H.E. Vladlen Semivolos: Ambassador Moses K. Kizige

Russia–Uganda relations refer to the bilateral diplomatic, economic, and military ties between the Russian Federation and the Republic of Uganda. The relationship has its roots in the Soviet Union's support for African independence movements and has evolved through various phases of cooperation, particularly in defense, trade, and diplomatic engagement. This is specifically since Uganda's independence in 1962 and have been influenced by broader geopolitical changes, including the end of the Cold War and Russia's renewed engagement with African nations in the 21st century.

Russia has an embassy in Kampala and Uganda has an embassy in Moscow.

== History ==
=== Soviet era ===
Diplomatic relations between Uganda and the Soviet Union were established on October 11–12, 1962, shortly after Uganda's independence. In 1964, the USSR and Uganda signed a trade agreement and an agreement on economic and technical cooperation, which provided for a loan of 14 million rubles to Uganda. On February 9, 1965, the USSR and Uganda signed a Trade Agreement in Kampala, Uganda.

During the Soviet period, the relationship was characterized by Moscow's support for African liberation movements and anti-colonial struggles. Ugandan President Yoweri Museveni has acknowledged that the Soviet Union provided crucial assistance to Africa's fight against colonialism.

=== Post-Cold War period ===
According to President Museveni, relations between Russia and Uganda have historically been excellent, with only a brief interruption following the dissolution of the Soviet Union. "We only had a short break after President of the Soviet Union Mikhail Gorbachev. It was an unstable period in Russia, and we did not cooperate then," Museveni explained, noting that relations resumed after this transitional period.

=== Modern era ===
The most active bilateral relations began to develop in the last two years of the 2000s. In August 2009, Ugandan President Yoweri Museveni visited Moscow on a private visit, holding talks with Foreign Minister Sergey Lavrov and Russian Chamber of Commerce and Industry President Yevgeny Primakov.

The country has a representation of the Kazan Helicopter Plant, which is a group of Russian experts on operation and maintenance of helicopters. In February 2011, a group of observers from the Russian Central Election Commission worked in the general elections in Uganda.

In December 2012, President Museveni made an official visit to Moscow, resulting in the signing of the Russian-Ugandan Government-to-Government Agreement on Military-Technical Cooperation.

== Military cooperation ==
=== Defense agreements ===
The Military and Technical Cooperation Agreement was signed by the Russian and Ugandan Governments on November 18, 2003 in Kampala. This agreement formalized the framework for defense cooperation between the two nations. In May 2015, an Intergovernmental Committee on Trade & Economic and Scientific & Technical Cooperation was established to enhance bilateral relations in various sectors, including defense.

=== Military equipment and training ===
Before 1990, Russia had supplied Uganda with T-72 and PT-76 tanks, BTR-60 APCs, and MiG-21 fighters. These were followed by T-90S tanks and Su-30MK2 fighters in later years. In August 2023, Ugandan Defense Minister Vincent Ssempijja expressed Uganda's openness for long-term military cooperation with Russia, stating: "Africa has been supported by the Russian people over the entire period of its struggle against the system of colonialism, and we value the sincere and mutually beneficial relations with Russia and stay open for long-term cooperation."

=== Recent developments ===
In March 2023, President Museveni expressed satisfaction with the defense cooperation between Uganda and Russia, emphasizing the historical ties and mutual support. During the Russia–Africa summit in July 2023, contracts totaling $4.5 billion were signed with African nations by Rosoboronexport, indicating the scope of Russia's military engagement with the continent, including Uganda.

== Economic relations ==
=== Trade statistics ===
Russia exported $128 million to Uganda in 2021, representing a 12.2% annual growth rate. The bilateral trade relationship has shown consistent growth over the past decade. Uganda's bilateral trade with Russia has doubled over the last ten years, from $30 million in 2009 to over $74 million by the end of 2018.

=== Economic cooperation ===
In April 2021, Russia announced plans to open a business support center in Uganda to facilitate economic cooperation and investment opportunities between the two countries.

== Space cooperation ==
In May 2023, Russia and Uganda signed a bilateral declaration to refrain from initiating the deployment of weapons in outer space, demonstrating cooperation in the peaceful use of space technology.

== Diplomatic engagement ==
- List of ambassadors of Russia to Uganda

=== High-level visits ===
Key visits include:

- August 2009: President Museveni's private visit to Moscow
- August 2012: President Museveni's official visit to Moscow
- July 2022: Russian Foreign Minister Sergey Lavrov's visit to Uganda as part of his African tour

== Current status ==
Since 2015, Russia has signed military cooperation agreements with 43 African countries, including Uganda. These agreements entail varying levels of engagement, from broad ceremonial agreements to more specific cooperation in areas such as military personnel training and weapons supply. The relationship continues to evolve with regular diplomatic consultations and expanding cooperation in defense, trade, and multilateral frameworks. Both countries have expressed commitment to strengthening their partnership based on mutual respect and shared interests in regional stability and economic development.

== See also ==
- Foreign relations of Russia
- Foreign relations of Uganda
- Soviet Union–Africa relations
