= List of diplomatic missions in Uganda =

This is a list of diplomatic missions in Uganda. The capital Kampala currently hosts 42 embassies/high commissions.

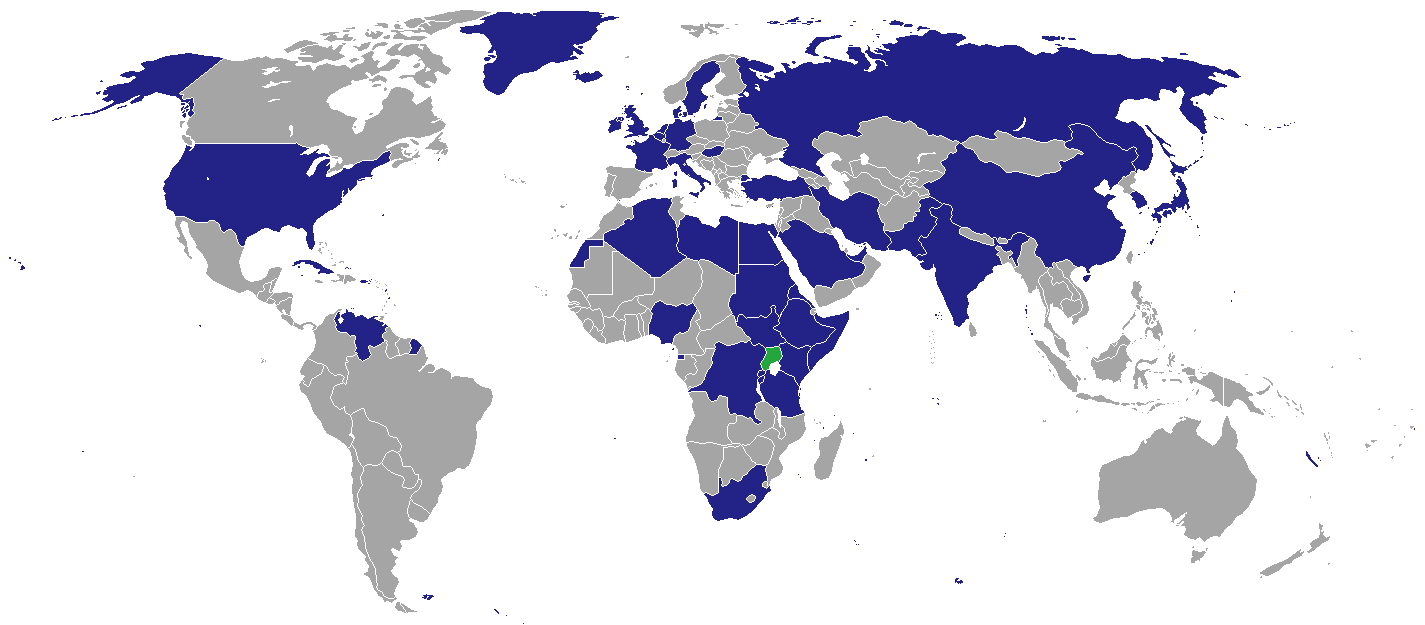
Map of diplomatic missions in Uganda

== Diplomatic missions in Kampala ==
=== Embassies/High commissions ===
1. Algeria
2. Belgium
3. Burundi
4. China
5. Congo-Kinshasa
6. Cuba
7. Denmark
8. Egypt
9. Equatorial Guinea
10. Eritrea
11. Ethiopia
12. France
13. Germany
14. Holy See (Nunciature)
15. Iceland
16. India
17. Iran
18. Ireland
19. Italy
20. Japan
21. Kenya
22. Libya
23. Netherlands
24. Nigeria
25. Pakistan
26. Qatar
27. Russia
28. Rwanda
29. Sahrawi Republic
30. Saudi Arabia
31. Somalia
32. South Africa
33. South Korea
34. South Sudan (Embassy)
35. Sudan
36. Sweden
37. Tanzania
38. Turkey
39. United Arab Emirates
40. United Kingdom
41. United States
42. Venezuela

=== Other delegations or missions ===
1. Angola (Liaison office)
2. European Union (Delegation)
3. Hungary (Embassy office)
4. United Nations (Resident Coordinator's Office)

== Gallery ==
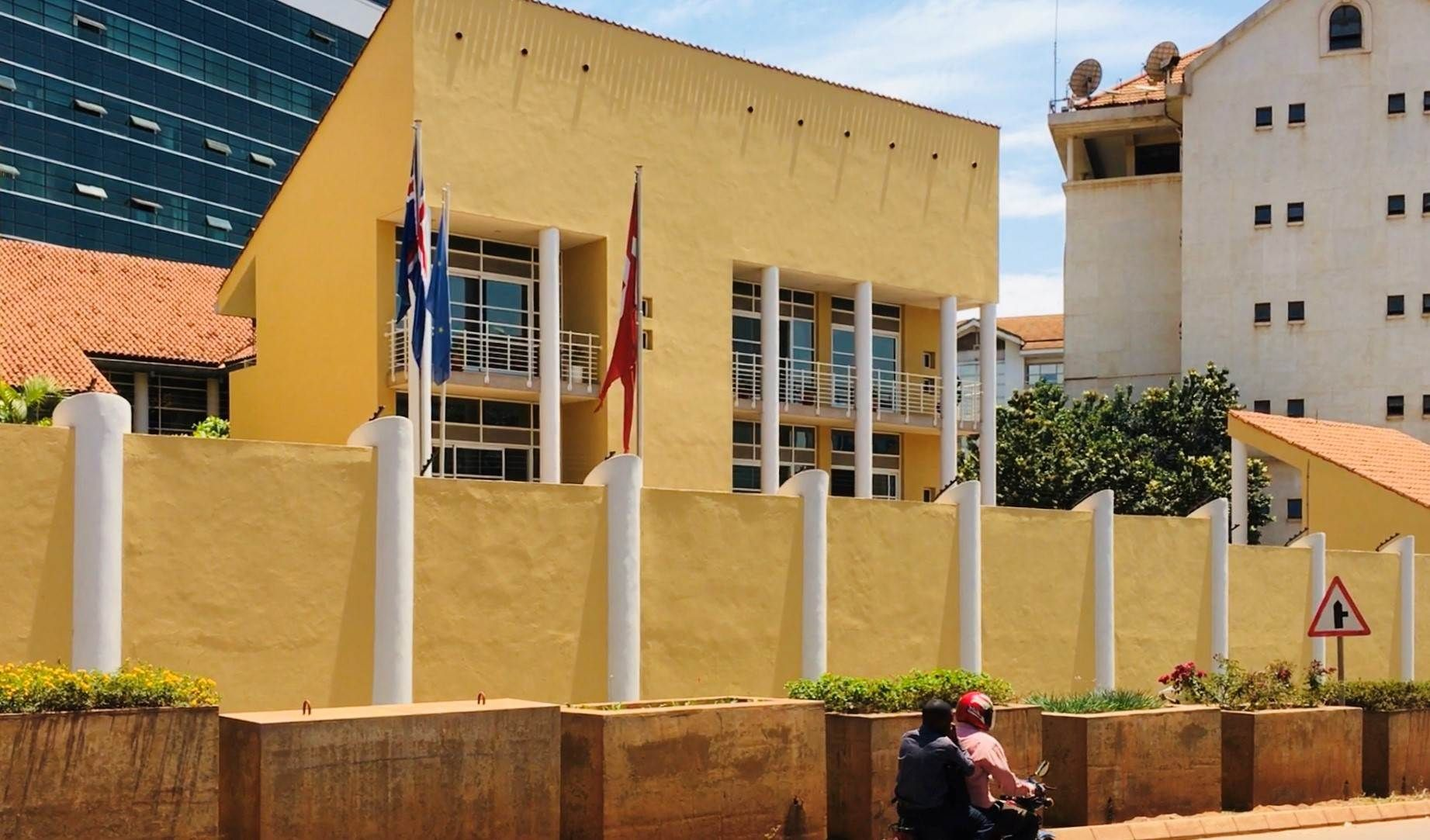
Embassies of Denmark and Iceland

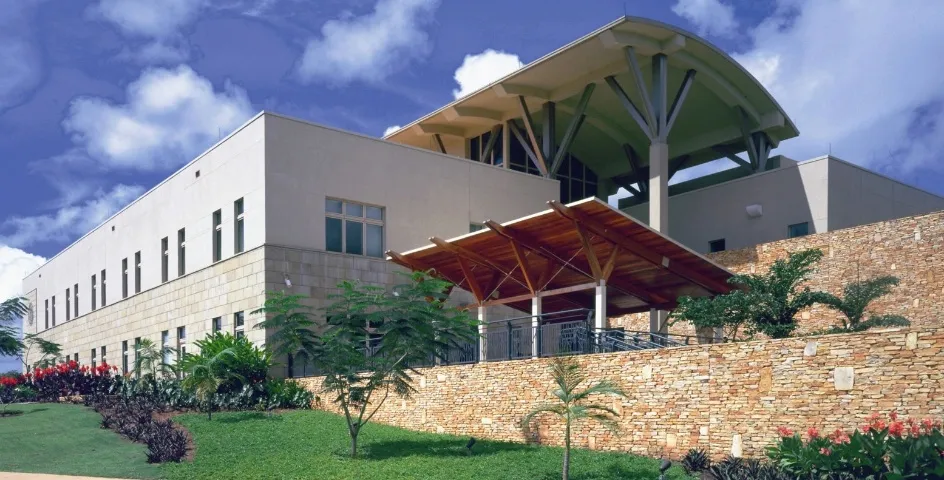
Embassy of the United States

== Consulate-General in Gulu ==
- Sudan

== Non-resident embassies and high commissions ==
=== Resident in Addis Ababa, Ethiopia ===
1. Austria
2. Czech Republic
3. Eswatini
4. Georgia
5. Kazakhstan
6. Kuwait
7. Lesotho
8. Madagascar
9. Mali
10. New Zealand
11. Nicaragua
12. Seychelles

=== Resident in Dar Es Salaam, Tanzania ===
1. Morocco
2. Norway
3. Vietnam

=== Resident in Nairobi, Kenya ===
1. Angola
2. Argentina
3. Australia
4. Belarus
5. Brazil
6. Canada
7. Chile
8. Colombia
9. Cyprus
10. Finland
11. Ghana
12. Greece
13. Hungary
14. Indonesia
15. Israel
16. Jordan
17. Malawi
18. Malaysia
19. Mexico
20. Mozambique
21. Nepal
22. Oman
23. Philippines
24. Poland
25. Portugal
26. Romania
27. Serbia
28. Slovakia
29. Spain
30. Switzerland
31. Thailand
32. Tunisia
33. Ukraine

=== Resident elsewhere ===
1. Croatia (Pretoria)
2. Malta (Valletta)
3. North Korea (Malabo)

== Former Embassies ==
- Australia (Note: Resident in Nairobi, Kenya)
- Brazil
- Canada
- Mozambique
- Norway
- North Korea (Note: Resident in Malabo, Bioko Norte, Equatorial Guinea)
- Portugal
- Spain
- Switzerland
- Trinidad and Tobago

== See also ==
- Foreign relations of Uganda
- Visa requirements for Ugandan citizens
