= Ministry of Foreign Affairs (Uganda) =

Government ministry of Uganda

Coordinates: 00°18′55″N 32°35′06″E

- Coat of Arms of Uganda

Ministry overview
- Formed: 9 October 1962
- Type: Ministry
- Jurisdiction: Government of Uganda
- Headquarters: 2A/B Apollo Kaggwa Road, Kampala, Uganda
- Ministers responsible: General Jeje Odongo, Minister of Foreign Affairs; Hon Henry Okello Oryem, Minister of State for Foreign Affairs (International Affairs)
- Ministry executive: Sam Kutesa, Minister of Foreign Affairs
- Website: Homepage

The Ministry of Foreign Affairs (MOFA) is a cabinet-level government ministry responsible for the implementation and management of Uganda's foreign policy and international activity.

== Location ==
The headquarters of the ministry are located at 2A Colville Street, on Nakasero Hill, in the Central Division of Kampala, the capital and largest city of Uganda. The coordinates of the headquarters are: 0°18'55.0"N, 32°35'06.0"E (Latitude:0.315267; Longitude:32.584990).

== Overview ==
The history of the ministry dates to the independence of Uganda on 9 October 1962. Initially, it was administratively under the Office of the Prime Minister. In 1971, it became a fully fledged ministry. In 1966, the position of State Minister for International Affairs was created, and in 1988 the position of State Minister for Regional Affairs was added.

== Political leadership ==
As of October 2016, Sam Kutesa is the minister of foreign affairs. He has held this position since 2005. The state minister for international affairs has been Henry Oryem Okello since 2005. Since 1 March 2015, Philemon Mateke has been the state minister for regional affairs.

== Organizational structure ==
Administratively, the ministry is divided into the Directorate of International Cooperation and the Directorate of Regional Cooperation.

It also has the following departments:

- Department of Finance and Administration, which is responsible for financial and administrative matters.
- Department of Internal Audit, which is responsible for risk assessment and the design of mitigating strategies. The department "is responsible in ensuring that all systems, controls, regulations and procedures are adequate and effective".
- Resource Centre, which is responsible for communications, public and media relations, information and communications technology issues, training and follow-up of ministerial and ambassador conferences, and related matters.
- Department of the African Union, which is responsible for designing, implementing, and coordinating the execution of the national policy towards the African Union.
- Department of Diaspora Services, which is responsible for developing, executing, and monitoring policies affecting Ugandans living and working outside of the country. It was created in 2007.
- Department of Asia and Pacific Region, which is responsible for the development, implementation, and coordination of policies and programs regarding relations with the countries of Asia, the Pacific Rim, and the Pacific Ocean.
- Department of East African Community and Ring States Department, which is responsible for developing, implementing, and coordinating government policies and programs towards the countries of the East African Community, the International Conference on the Great Lakes Region, and the Intergovernmental Authority on Development.
- Department of European Relations, which is responsible for formulating, implementing, and coordinating Uganda's relations with European countries.

== Notable policy positions ==
During the 2019-2020 Hong Kong protests, Uganda was among the African countries that expressed support for China's approach. In October 2019, the Ministry of Foreign Affairs issued a statement that Uganda "firmly supports the one country, two systems policy of the People's Republic of China on the matter of Hong Kong and other areas" and that "Hong Kong's affairs are China's domestic affairs."

== See also ==
- Foreign relations of Uganda
- List of diplomatic missions of Uganda
