= Malaysia–Uganda relations =

- Malaysia: Uganda

Envoy
- High Commissioner: High Commissioner

Malaysia–Uganda relations refers to the bilateral relations between Malaysia and Uganda. Malaysia does not have a High Commission in Uganda while Uganda has a High Commission in Kuala Lumpur. Both countries are members of the Non-Aligned Movement and Commonwealth of Nations.

== History ==
Both countries were once part of the British Empire and Uganda established a diplomatic relations with Malaysia immediately after attaining independence in 1962.

In the 2000s, Malaysia had become a strategic partner in Uganda's socio-economic transformation, with investments in infrastructure and education. Despite facing global economic challenges, both nations found common ground in their pursuit of mutual benefits through South-South cooperation. This relationship, however, was further strengthened post-2020, as both countries sought to rebuild and diversify their economies following the impacts of the COVID-19 pandemic.

== Economic relations ==
In 1998, Malaysia and Uganda signed a memorandum of understanding towards economic, scientific, technical and cultural co-operation agreement. While in 2011, Malaysia and Uganda signed an MoU on standards during the CHOGM meeting in Perth. A Malaysian university also has decided to open a campus in Uganda. Some Malaysian palm oil company has already operating in Kalangala at the invitation of President Yoweri Museveni. Another Malaysian oil palm company also has invested a total of U$10 million in the country.

== See also ==
- Foreign relations of Malaysia
- Foreign relations of Uganda
