= Germany–Uganda relations =

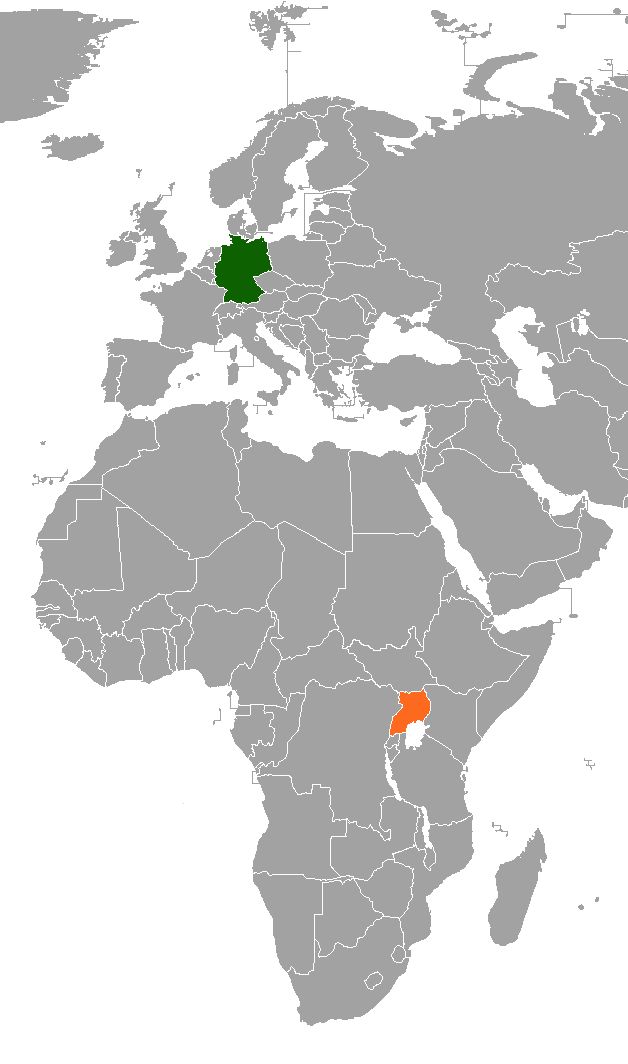

- Germany: Uganda

German-Uganda relations have existed since 1962 and are described by the German Foreign Office as "positive". Uganda is one of the priority countries of German development aid and more than 100 associations and initiatives from Germany support humanitarian projects in Uganda.

== History ==
On February 27, 1890, the Uganda Treaty between the German colonialist Carl Peters and the King (Kabaka) Mwanga II of Buganda was signed. The treaty was to expand German East Africa to areas north of Lake Victoria. However, with the later Helgoland-Zanzibar Treaty, the Uganda Treaty lost its importance and Uganda became the British Protectorate of Uganda.

In 1962, the Federal Republic of Germany (FRG) and Uganda, which had become independent, established diplomatic relations. Heinz Wersdörfer became the first ambassador of the FRG in Uganda. Two years later, the first projects in the bilateral development partnership were started. In 1973, diplomatic relations were established with the German Democratic Republic (GDR) by Uganda.

In 1976, the Entebbe International Airport became the scene of Operation Entebbe, in which an Israeli commando freed hostages from the hands of Palestinian and German hijackers. The Ugandan dictator at the time Idi Amin had supported the kidnappers, which put a strain on relations with the West.

In 2000 the Deutsch-Ugandische Gesellschaft e.V. was founded in Heilbronn. In 2007 the Federal Ministry for Economic Cooperation and Development declared Uganda a priority country for German development aid.

== Economic relations ==
The bilateral trade volume was 231 million euros in 2021. Uganda exports raw materials and agricultural products such as coffee, gold, tea and fish to Germany. All imports from Uganda to Germany are duty-free and quota-free, with the exception of armaments, as part of the Everything but Arms initiative of the European Union. In return, the country imports industrial and chemical products from Germany.

Germany is a major donor of development aid to Uganda. The focus of German development aid is in the areas of renewable energies and energy efficiency, promotion of civil society and agriculture and rural development, including the protection of the country's water resources. In addition, the Federal Republic of Germany provides humanitarian aid for refugees in Uganda.

== Culture ==
In Uganda there is a Goethe-Zentrum to promote German culture and language. The German Academic Exchange Service is also active in the country. The German language is taught at 14 schools.

The German singer Deena (real name Sabrina Herr) became a pop star in Uganda.

== Diplomatic locations ==
- Germany has an embassy in Kampala.
- Uganda has an embassy in Berlin.

== See also ==
- Foreign relations of Germany
- Foreign relations of Uganda
