= South Sudan–Uganda relations =

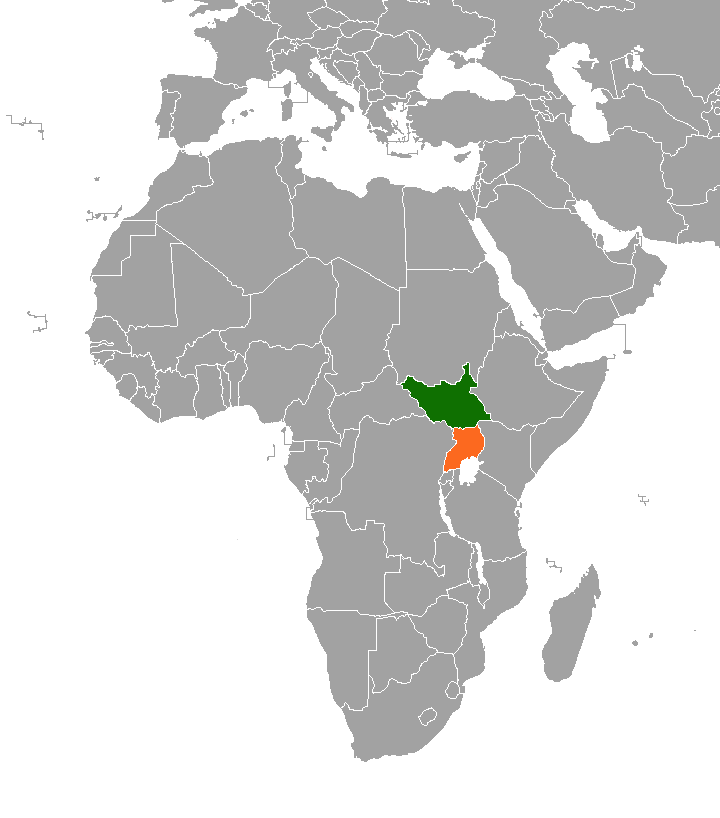

- South Sudan: Uganda

South Sudan–Uganda relations are the bilateral diplomatic relations between South Sudan and Uganda. The two countries share a 475 km-long border. South Sudan and Uganda maintain relatively strong cultural, political, and economic relations with each other. As South Sudan moved toward independence, the two countries began to expand opportunities in trade, development, and educational exchange. However, the rebel group known as the Lord's Resistance Army (LRA) continues to operate in border areas between South Sudan, the Democratic Republic of the Congo, and Uganda.

== Political relations ==
Political relationship between South Sudan and Uganda have been friendly for several decades, in contrast to Kampala's relationships with the Khartoum government, which have often been strained. One reason for this is that Sudan's President, Omar al-Bashir, is alleged to have provided support to the LRA, which terrorized northern Uganda for many years.

Uganda's longtime President, Yoweri Museveni, was a personal friend of South Sudan rebel leader John Garang and supported the Sudan People's Liberation Army (SPLA), which fought for the region's independence. A day before South Sudan voted on a cessation referendum, Museveni came out vocally for separation, saying, "…unity should be principled unity; not unity based on suppression and inequality."

Two weeks after the ouster of Sudan's Omar al-Bashir, Uganda's foreign minister Okello Oryem, announced that his country may offer Bashir refuge.

A border dispute emerged in 2005 between communities in the Kajo-Keji county of South Sudan and the Ugandan district of Moyo. Tensions and incidents of violence along the border forced the suspension of a project to construct a road and a communications tower in the area. The presidents of Uganda and the South Sudan region met in November 2010 to promote the peaceful resolution of the dispute, but an agreement had not yet been reached.

On October 27, 2020, the SSPDF and the UPDF clashed near Pogee, Magwi County, in South Sudan's Eastern Equatoria State, leaving two South Sudanese soldiers dead. Both sides believed they were on their country's side of the border.

== Economic relations ==
South Sudan has emerged in recent years as the largest importer of Ugandan goods. Over 150,000 Ugandan traders operate across the border, generating an estimated $900 million in business. South Sudan relies heavily on its neighbors to provide goods such as construction materials and services such as skilled and unskilled labor. Approximately 1,500 Ugandans work in Southern Sudan in the construction industry, and 1,200 Ugandan professional are employed there with non-governmental organizations, ministries and industries.

The governments of Uganda and Southern Sudan have taken steps to strengthen economies ties, including a joint project to construct a state-of-the-art market in Juba, estimated to cost around $850,000.

Challenges to Ugandan trade and business in Southern Sudan include concerns over corruption and discrimination, poor road conditions, and language barriers. Construction is underway on a railroad line that will link Juba and parts of northern Uganda.

== Cultural relations ==
Over 100,000 students from Southern Sudan are currently attending school in Uganda and thousands more are expected to pursue undergraduate and graduate education in Kenya and Uganda in coming years. At the same time, many teachers from Kenya and Uganda have come to Southern Sudan to teach, given the region's shortage of professionally trained educators.

== Military relations ==
Based on an agreement with the government in Khartoum, Ugandan military forces entered Southern Sudan in 2002 to fight LRA rebels. The agreement expired in 2006 and was not formally renewed by the Southern Sudan regional government, but Ugandan military operations were allowed to continue. A rift developed over appropriate strategy when Joseph Kony, leader of the LRA, refused to appear twice to sign peace agreements. In June 2008, relations between South Sudan and Uganda became further strained when Uganda People's Defence Force (UPDF) soldiers were accused of posing as LRA rebels and killing and kidnapping civilians in the Nabanga area. Following this incident, Southern Sudan demanded that Uganda withdraw its troops from its territory. Nevertheless, in 2008 troops from Uganda, South Sudan and Congo launched the joint Garamba Offensive in the Democratic Republic of Congo in an effort to eliminate the LRA militarily.

Uganda has deployed troops to South Sudan multiple times, including during the 2013 civil war and again in 2016. In March 2025, Uganda sent special forces to Juba as tensions between Salva Kiir and Riek Machar threatened to reignite conflict. The UPDF declared support for Kiir and warned against any attempts to overthrow him. The United Nations urged restraint as fighting continued in South Sudan.
