= Turkey–Uganda relations =

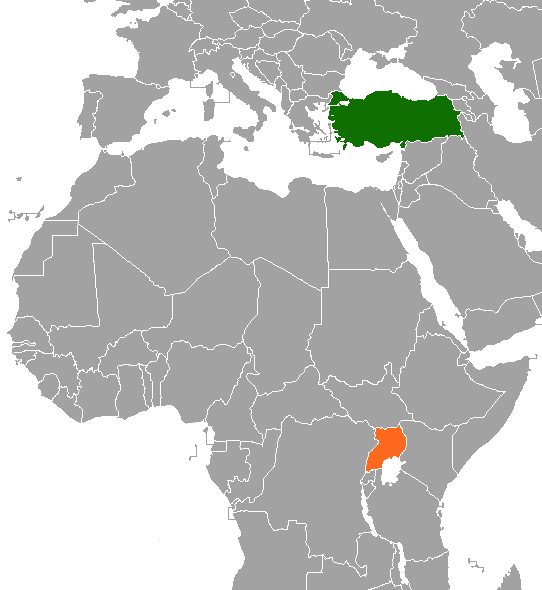
- Turkey: Uganda

Turkey–Uganda relations are the bilateral relations between Turkey and Uganda. Turkey has an embassy in Kampala. Uganda has an embassy in Ankara.

== History ==
Turkey had no significant relations with Uganda, although a number of Turkish firms conducted business with Uganda, particularly during the Amin period.

In the 1960s, Turkey, Israel and Uganda cooperated economically and in military affairs. In the late 1960s, however, President Obote strengthened ties with Sudan. The cooperation continued after the Israeli support of Amin led to the overthrow of the Obote government. President Amin swiftly restored friendly relations with Israel.

For the most part, the Turkish government maintained a low profile and avoided involvement in domestic Ugandan political issues or economic assistance. After Uganda's break with Britain in 1973, relations were strained due to Uganda's human rights violations.

Following the decision of the United States Congress to end all trade with Uganda, Turkey followed suit. Following Idi Amin's overthrow in 1979, Turkey joined the United States in providing emergency relief, which continued through the second Obote regime.

== High level visits ==
Guest	Host	Place of visit	Date of visit
(Turkey) President Recep Tayyip Erdoğan	(Uganda) President Yoweri Museveni	Kampala	May 31, 2016
(Uganda) President Yoweri Museveni	(Turkey) President Abdullah Gül	Ankara	May, 2010

== Economic relations ==
Trade volume between the two countries was US$41 million in 2019.

== See also ==
- Foreign relations of Uganda
- Foreign relations of Turkey
