= Mexico–Uganda relations =

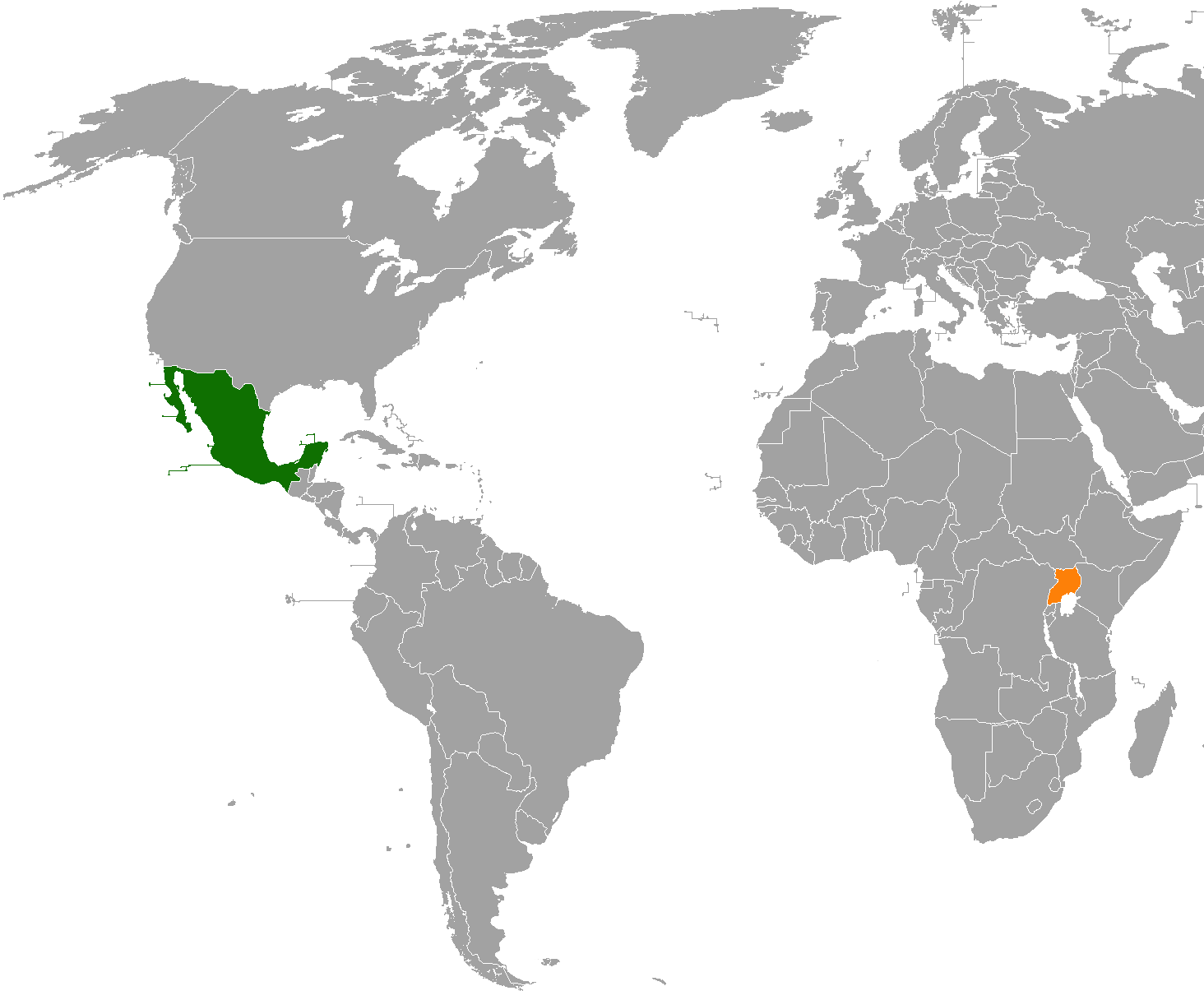

- Mexico: Uganda

The nations of Mexico and Uganda established diplomatic relations in 1976. Both nations are members of the United Nations.

== History ==
On 20 February 1976, Mexico and Uganda formally established diplomatic relations, fourteen years after Uganda obtained its Independence from the United Kingdom. Mexico soon accredited its embassy in Nairobi, Kenya to Uganda. Since the establishment of diplomatic relations; relations between both nations have been almost non-existent and have taken place in mainly international forums such as at the United Nations. In 2001, Mexico opened an honorary consulate in Kampala.

In May 2010, Mexican Foreign Undersecretary, Lourdes Aranda Bezaury, paid a visit to Uganda, along with the Mexican ambassador resident in Kenya, Luis Javier Campuzano. While in Uganda, they met with Ugandan President Yoweri Museveni where he expressed his interest for the President of Mexico to attend the 15th African Union Summit being held in Kampala in July 2010.

In July 2010, Mexican President Felipe Calderón attended the 15th African Union Summit in Kampala where he attended as a guest of honor. During the meeting between President Calderón and President Museveni, both leaders exchanged views on the effects of the international economic crisis, as well as the global challenge posed by climate change. Both leaders also agreed on the need to strengthen cooperation between the two countries in areas of mutual interest, such as trade, agro-industry, the energy sector and the fight against poverty; as well as promoting scientific, cultural and educational exchange.

In November 2010, Ugandan Minister for Water and Environment Maria Mutagamba attended the 2010 United Nations Climate Change Conference being held in Cancún, Mexico on behalf of Uganda. In 2013, Mexican Foreign Undersecretary Lourdes Aranda Bezaury and the Mexican ambassador resident in Kenya, Luis Javier Campuzano, returned to Uganda to promote the candidacy of Dr. Herminio Blanco Mendoza to the post of Director-General of the World Trade Organization.

In 2019, several hundred African migrants entered Mexico en route to the Mexico–United States border. Many of the migrants originated from Uganda and were attempting to seek asylum in the United States and escaping civil unrest and human rights abuses in Uganda.

In 2024, both nations celebrated 48 years of diplomatic relations.

== High-level visits ==
High-level visits from Mexico to Uganda

- Foreign Undersecretary Lourdes Aranda Bezaury (2010, 2013)
- President Felipe Calderón (2010)

High-level visits from Uganda to Mexico

- Minister of Tourism Edward Rugumayo (2003)
- Minister for Water and Environment Maria Mutagamba (2010)
- Minister of Finance Maria Kiwanuka (2014)

== Bilateral agreements ==
Both nations have signed a Memorandum of Understanding for the Establishment of a Consultative Mechanism on Mutual Interest (2010).

== Trade ==
In 2023, trade between Mexico and Uganda totaled US$18.5 million. Mexico's main exports to Uganda include: valves and similar materiales for pipes, machinery and mechanical appliances, chemical based products, parts and accessories of motor vehicles, yeast, malt extract, seeds, fruits and spores for sewing. Uganda's main exports to Mexico include: mineral materiales, coffee, tea, machines and apparatus, calculating machines and pocket recorders, chemical based products, rubber, clothing, and wood.

== Diplomatic missions ==
- Mexico is accredited to Uganda from its embassy in Nairobi, Kenya and maintains an honorary consulate in Kampala.
- Uganda is accredited to Mexico from its embassy in Washington, D.C., United States.
