= Bangladesh–Uganda relations =

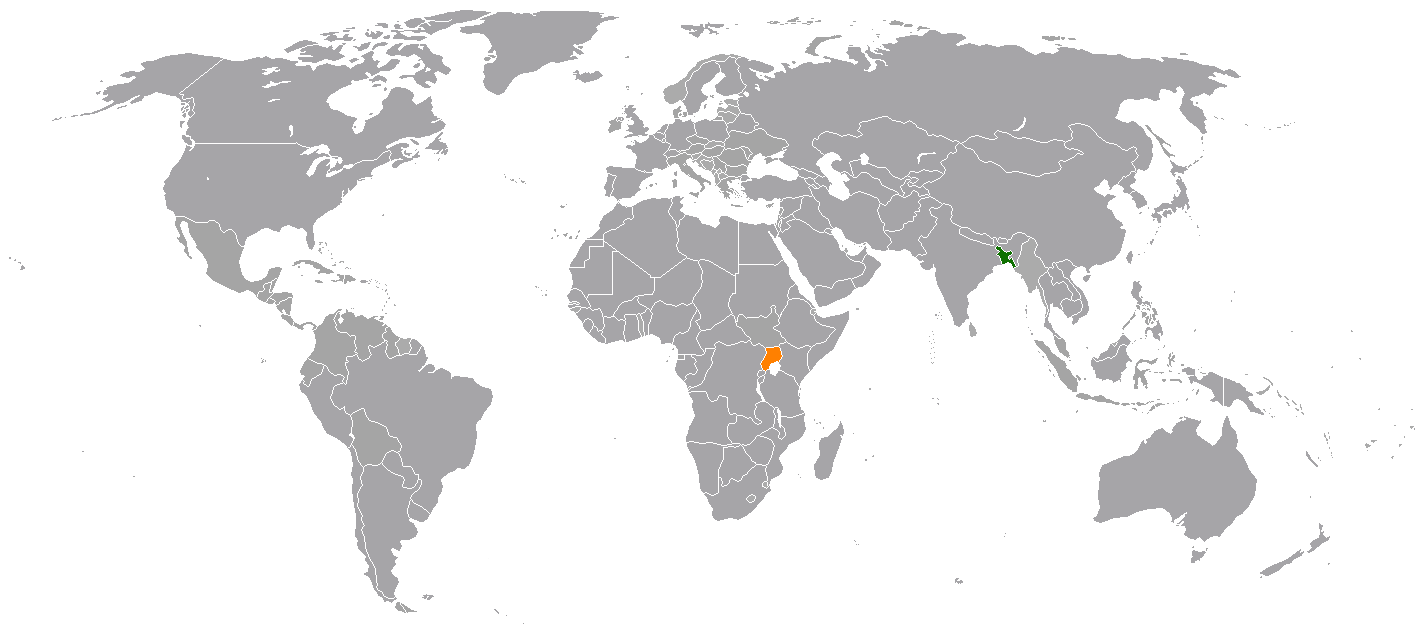

- Bangladesh: Uganda

Bangladesh–Uganda relations refer to bilateral relations between Bangladesh and Uganda. The relationship is primarily based on the agricultural sector and poverty reduction. Neither country has a resident ambassador.

== High level visits ==
Former Uganda vice president Gilbert Bukenya paid a visit to Dhaka in 2009.

== Bangladeshi NGOs in Uganda ==
A number of Bangladeshi NGOs are operating in Uganda and have influential presence in the social development of the country. Bangladesh based BRAC is currently the largest NGO operating in Uganda. Established in 2006, BRAC Uganda is engaged in microfinance, small enterprise, adolescent empowerment, education, agriculture, livestock and poultry and health sectors in the country. As of 2013, BRAC has presence in over 74 districts of Uganda, operating from 150 branches nationwide.

== Cooperation in agricultural sector ==
Bangladesh and Uganda have signed an MoU for agricultural cooperation. To ensure future food security, Bangladesh has been looking for lease of lands in other countries to grow food which would be exported to Bangladesh and Uganda has been one of the most desirable destinations. Several Bangladeshi companies have leased out unused cultivable lands in Uganda for commercial farming in this purpose.

== See also ==
- Foreign relations of Bangladesh
- Foreign relations of Uganda
