= Embassy of South Sudan, Kampala =

South Sudanese embassy in Kampala, Uganda

The Embassy of the Republic of South Sudan in Uganda is the official diplomatic mission of the Government of South Sudan in Uganda. It was established in the capital Kampala in 1998 to provide diplomatic engagement and pursue the interests of the Government and people of South Sudan in Uganda.

The Head of Mission of South Sudan in Uganda is ambassador Simon Juach Deng who was appointed as ambassador by South Sudanese president Salva Kiir in October 2022.

== Mission ==
The diplomatic mission in Uganda was established to ensure both South Sudan and Uganda enjoy cordial relations and the mission's mandate is to forge closer relations between the people of the Republic of South Sudan and the people of the Republic of Uganda.

== Location ==
The Embassy of South Sudan in Uganda is located at Plot No.2 Sezibwa Road behind Fairway Hotel and near Serena Hotel and Nakasero Primary School in Nakasero, Kampala, Uganda.
