= Embassy of Uganda, Washington, D.C. =

Embassy of Uganda in Washington, D.C.
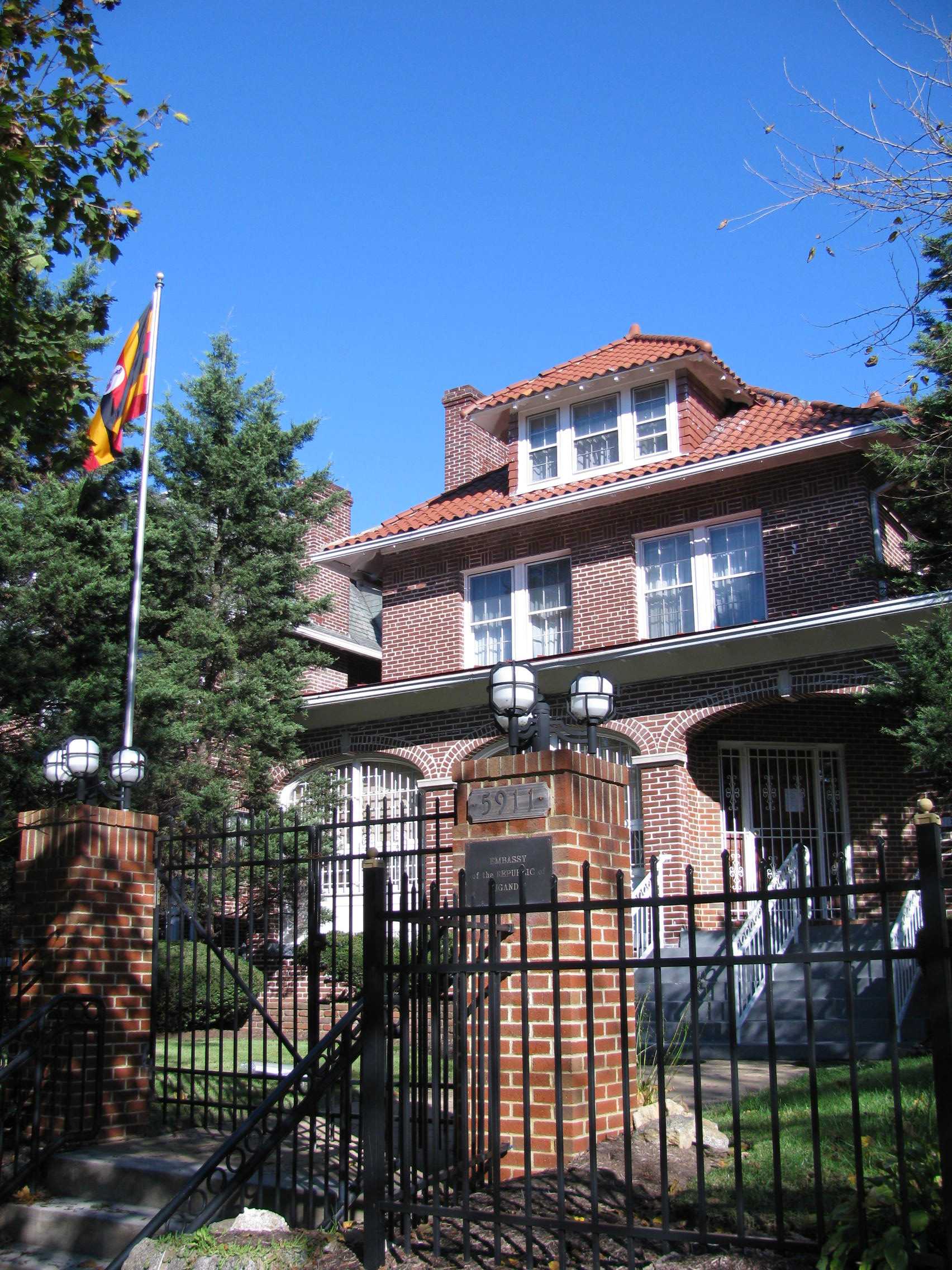
- Location: Washington, DC, United States
- Address: 5911 16th Street NW, Washington, DC.
- Coordinates: 38°57′40″N 77°2′10″W
- Ambassador: Robie Kakonge

The Embassy of the Republic of Uganda in Washington, D.C. is the diplomatic mission of the Republic of Uganda to the United States. It is located at 5911 16th Street Northwest, Washington, D.C.

== See also ==
- Uganda – United States relations
