= High Commission of Uganda, London =

High Commission of Uganda in London
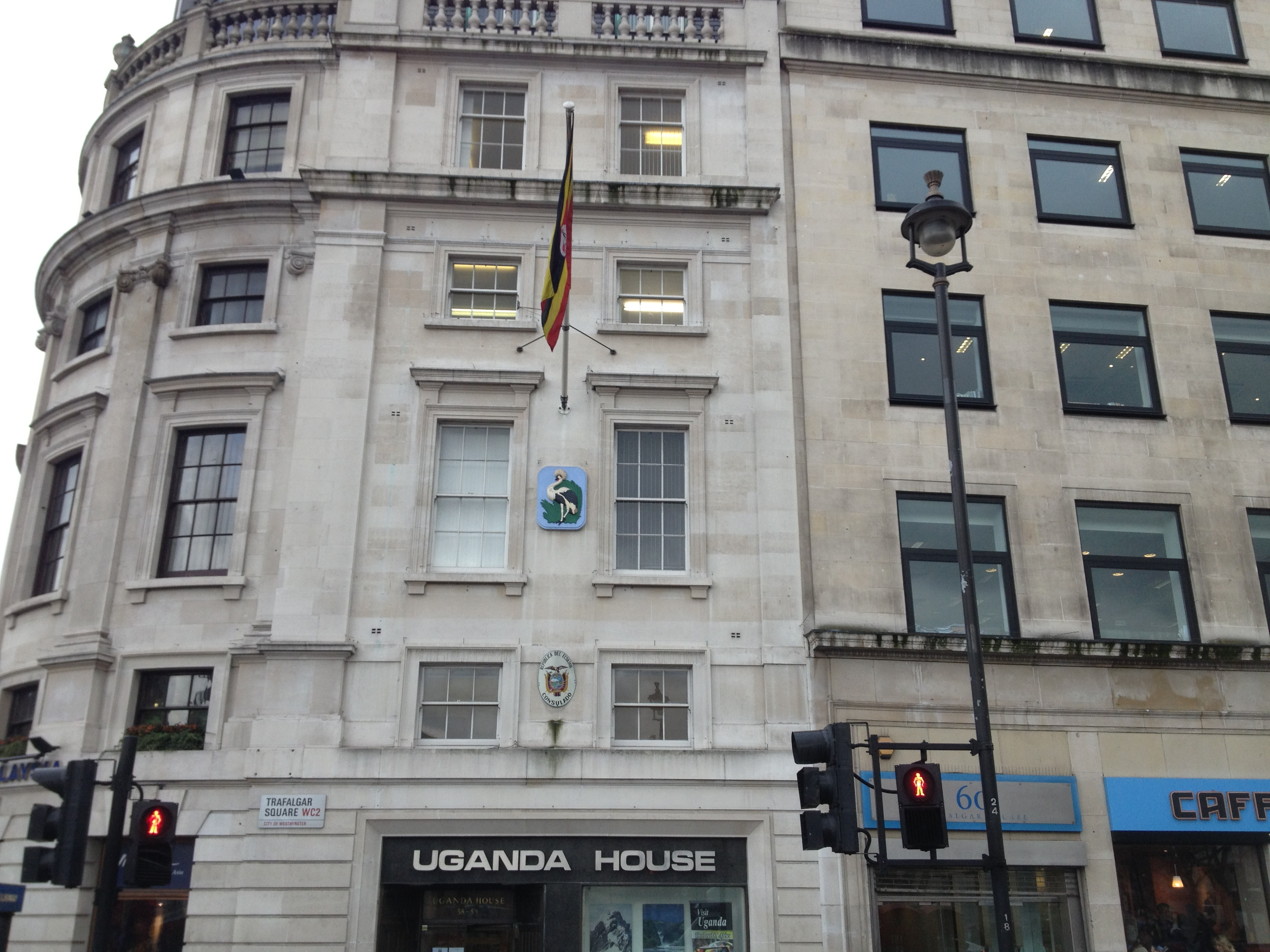
- Location: Westminster, London, United Kingdom
- Address: Uganda House, 58-59 Trafalgar Square, London WC2N 5DX
- Coordinates: 51°30′26″N 0°7′42″W
- Jurisdiction: United Kingdom and Republic of Ireland
- High Commissioner: Nimisha Jayant Madhvani
- Website: london.mofa.go.ug

The High Commission of Uganda in London is the diplomatic mission of Uganda in the United Kingdom. It is located in Uganda House, next to Admiralty Arch on Trafalgar Square; it shares the building with the Embassy of Burundi.

In 2011 a protest was held outside by High Commission by diaspora Ugandans opposed to the Presidency of Yoweri Museveni, and also in 2012 by people opposed to the Uganda Anti-Homosexuality Bill.

In 2012, it was revealed that two staff at the High Commission were being investigated for suspected smuggling and tax evasion.

== Gallery ==
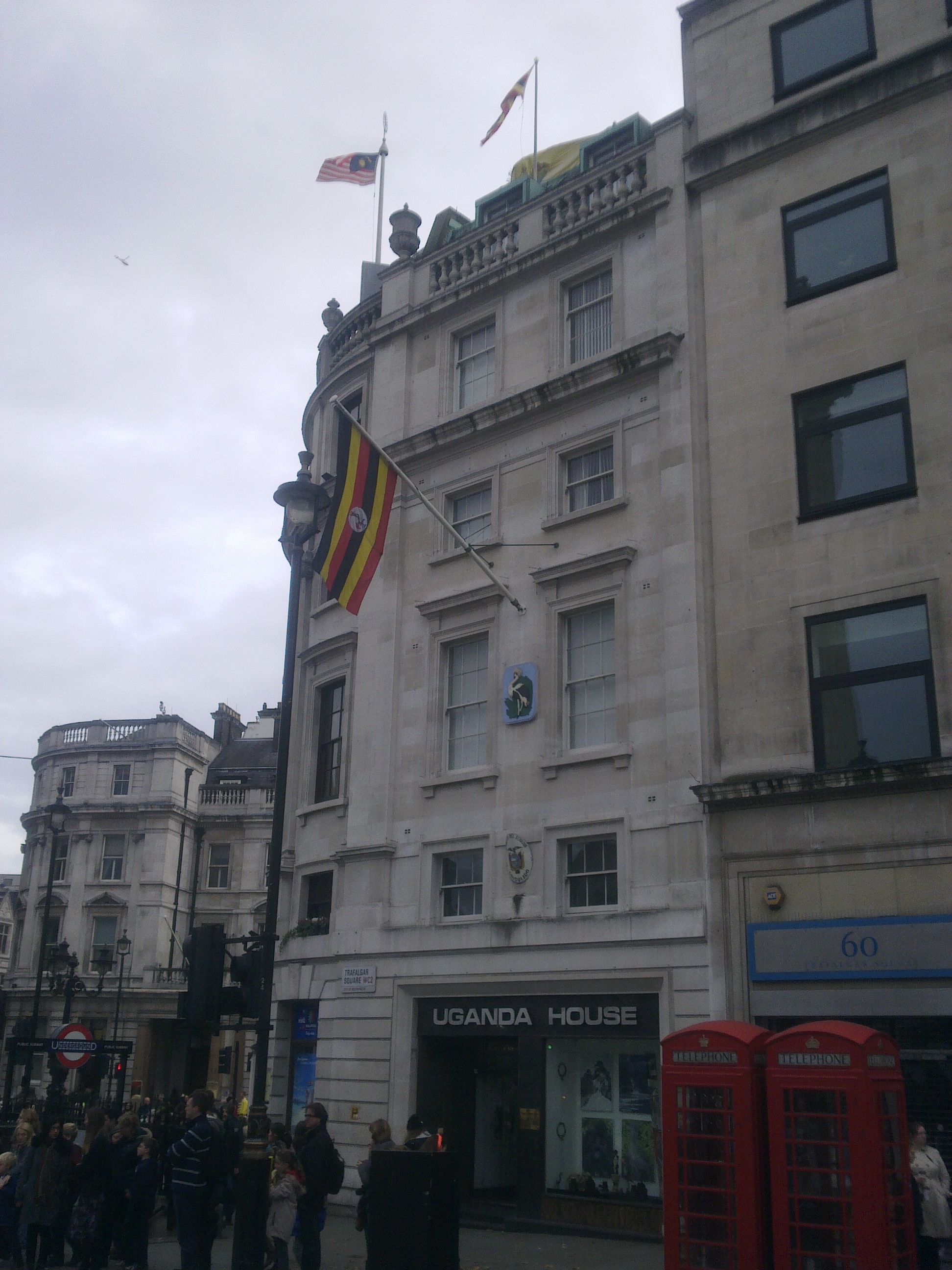
The High Commission

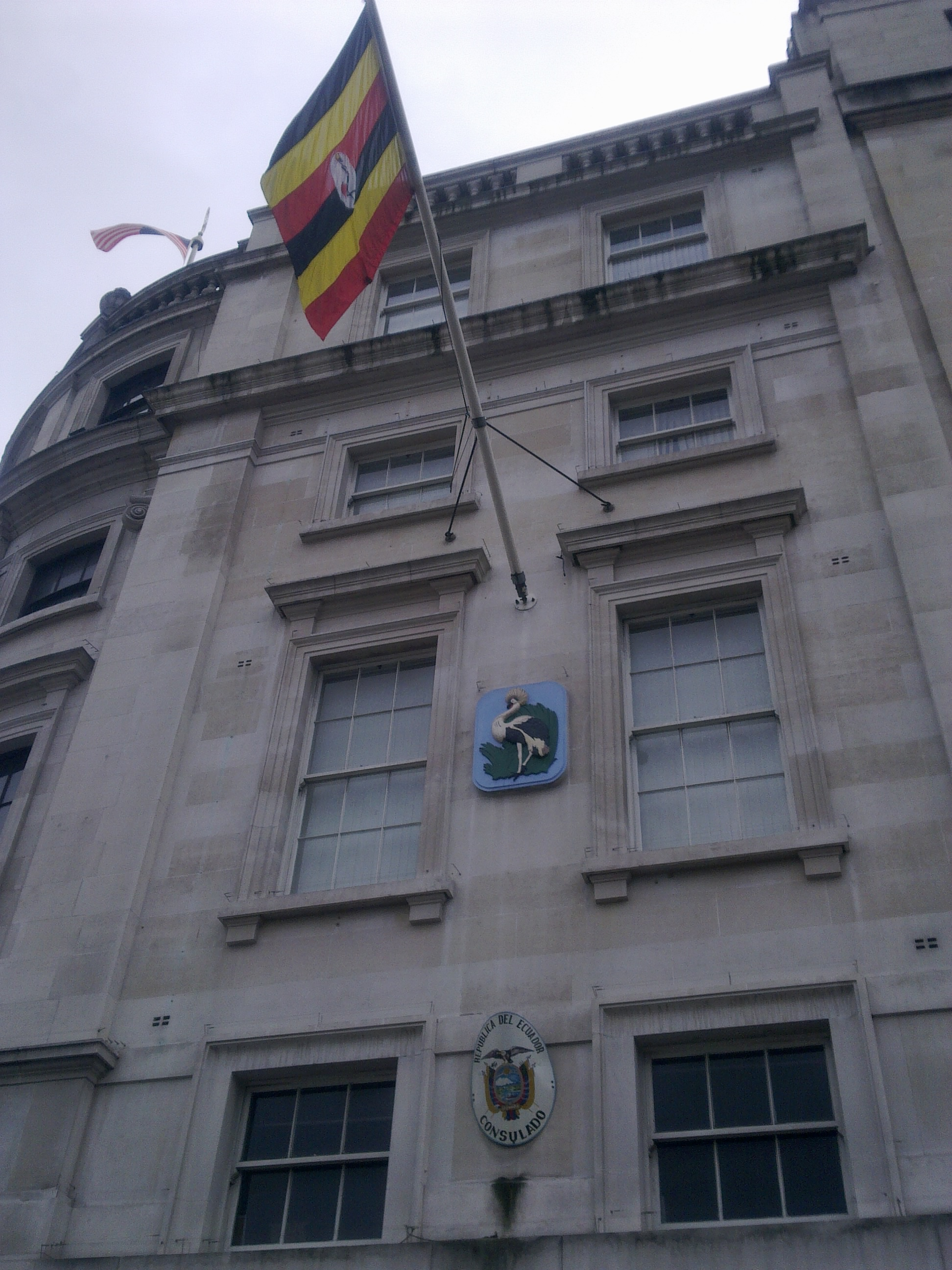
Flag and plaque

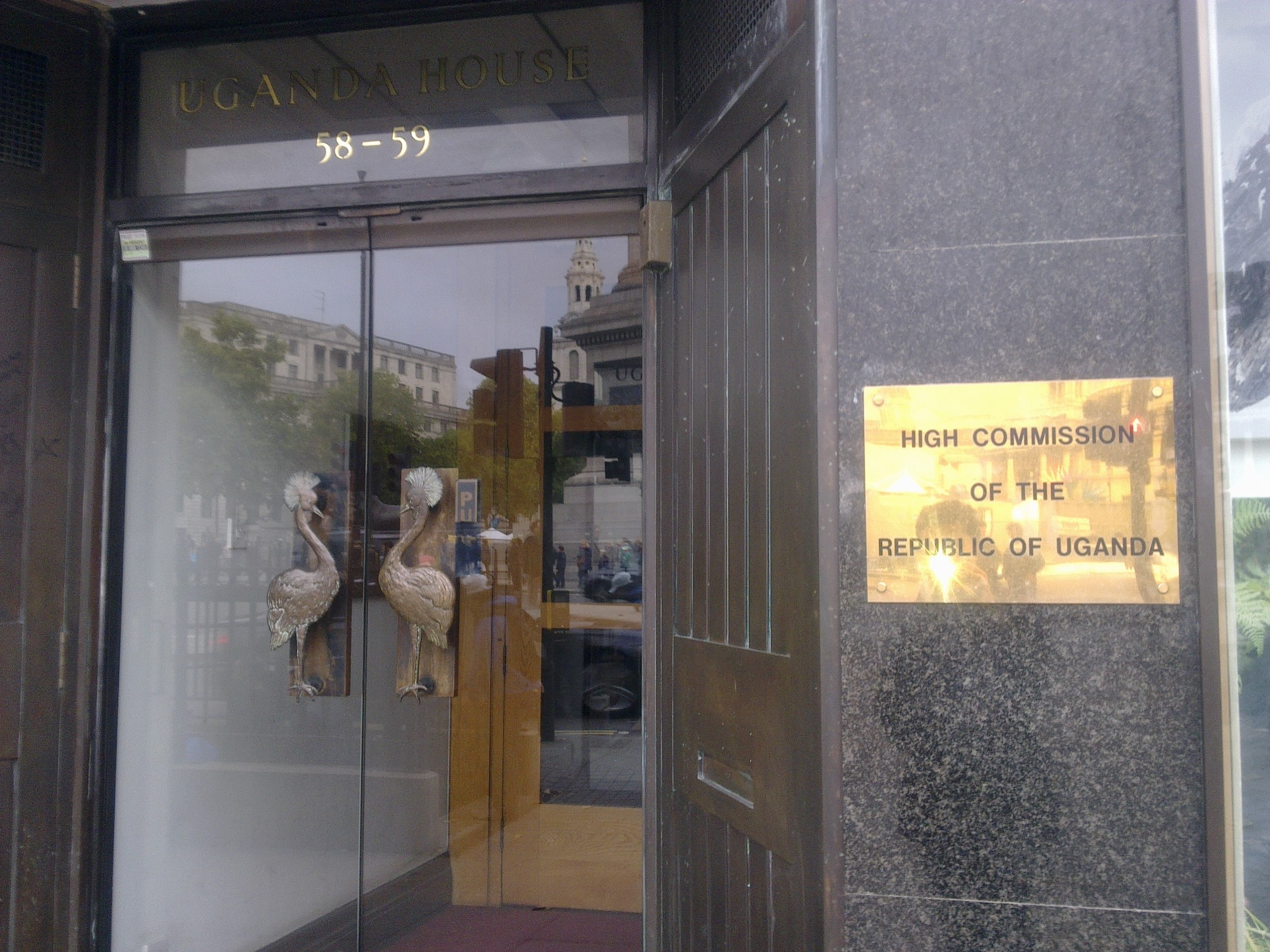
The entrance

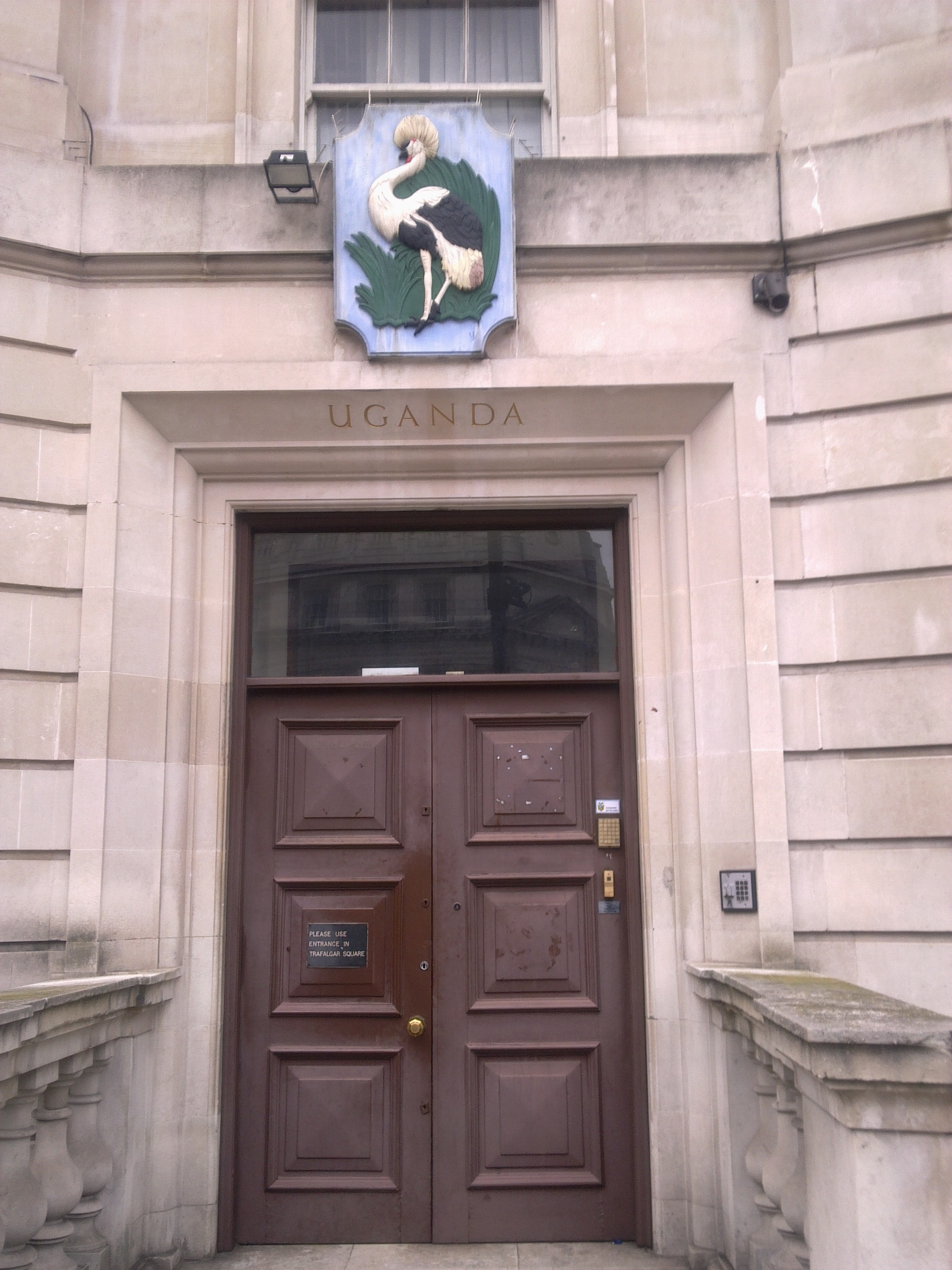
Side entrance

== See also ==
- Diplomatic missions of Uganda
- High Commission of South Africa, London
- High Commission of Canada, London
