= Henry Oryem Okello =

Ugandan lawyer and politician

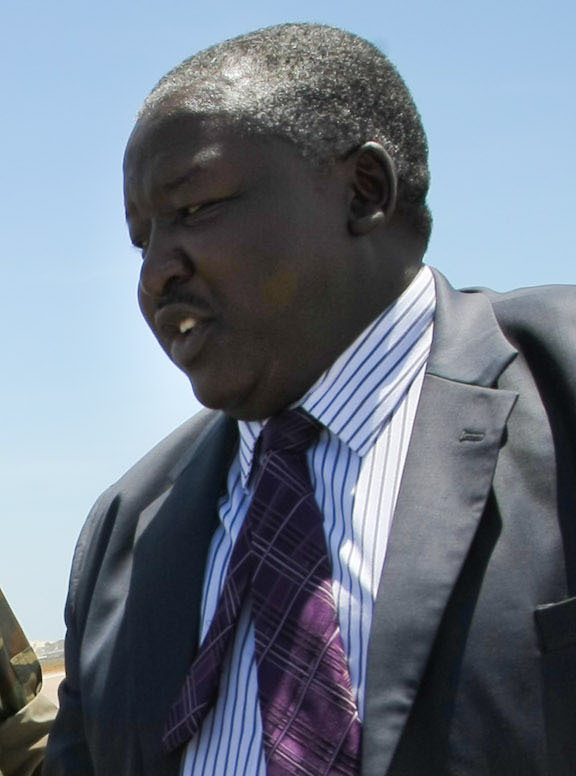
- Okello in 2012
- Born: 21 January 1960 (age 66); Uganda
- Citizenship: Uganda
- Education: University of Buckingham (Bachelor of Laws); University of Southampton (Master of Laws); General Council of the Bar (Barrister-at-Law)
- Occupations: Lawyer & Politician
- Years active: 1988–present
- Known for: Politics
- Title: State Minister for Foreign Affairs (International Affairs)

Henry Oryem Okello (born 21 January 1960) is a Ugandan lawyer and politician. He is the former State Minister for Foreign Affairs (International Affairs), a position appointed to him in 2004 until the formation of cabinet 2026-2031 of May 2026. In the cabinet reshuffles of 1 June 2006, that of 16 February 2009, and that of 27 May 2011, he retained his cabinet post. He has previously served as State Minister for Sports, from 2001 until 2005. He also served as the elected Member of Parliament for Chua County, Kitgum District, until 2021.

== Early life and education ==
Henry Oryem was born in Chwa County in Kitgum District on 21 January 1960. His late father was General Tito Lutwa Okello (1914–1996), who served as President of Uganda between July 1985 and January 1986.

Oryem Okello holds the degree of Bachelor of Laws with Honours, from the University of Buckingham in the United Kingdom, obtained in 1985. He also holds the degree of Master of Laws, from the University of Southampton, also in the UK, obtained in 1989. He was a practising Barrister-at-Law in k, before he left to enter Uganda's politics in 2001.

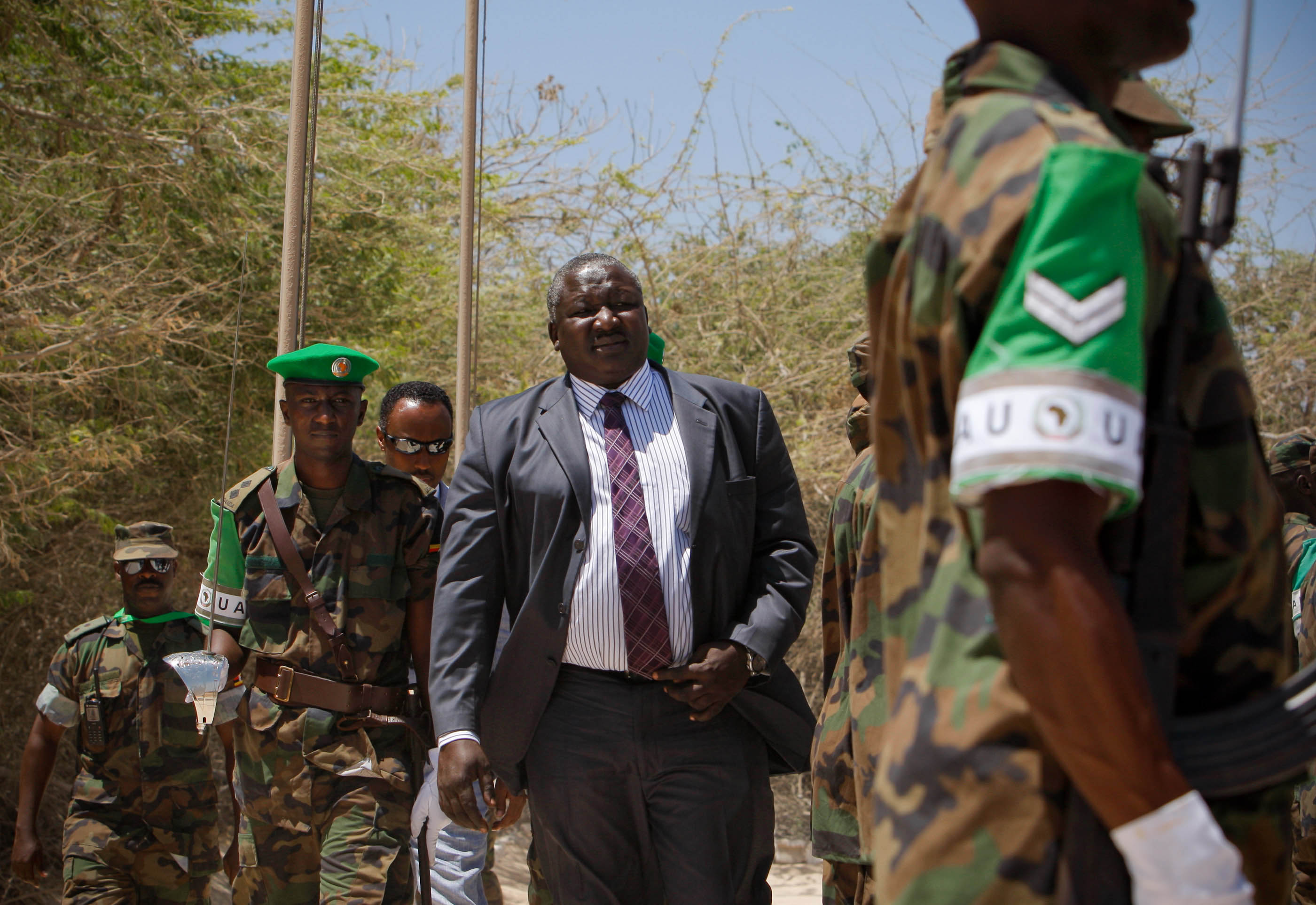
Ugandan Acting Foreign Minister Okello Oryem visits AMISOM

== Career ==
He practised as a legal executive between 1988 and 2000, in the United Kingdom. In 2001, he was elected to represent Chwa County, Kitgum District, in the Ugandan Parliament, serving continuously until 2006. He was appointed Minister of State for Education and Sports, responsible for sports, serving in that capacity concurrent with his parliamentary responsibilities, until 2005. In 2005 he was appointed to his current ministerial position. Between 2001 and 2005, he served as the Anglophone Vice President, Supreme Council for Sports in Africa.

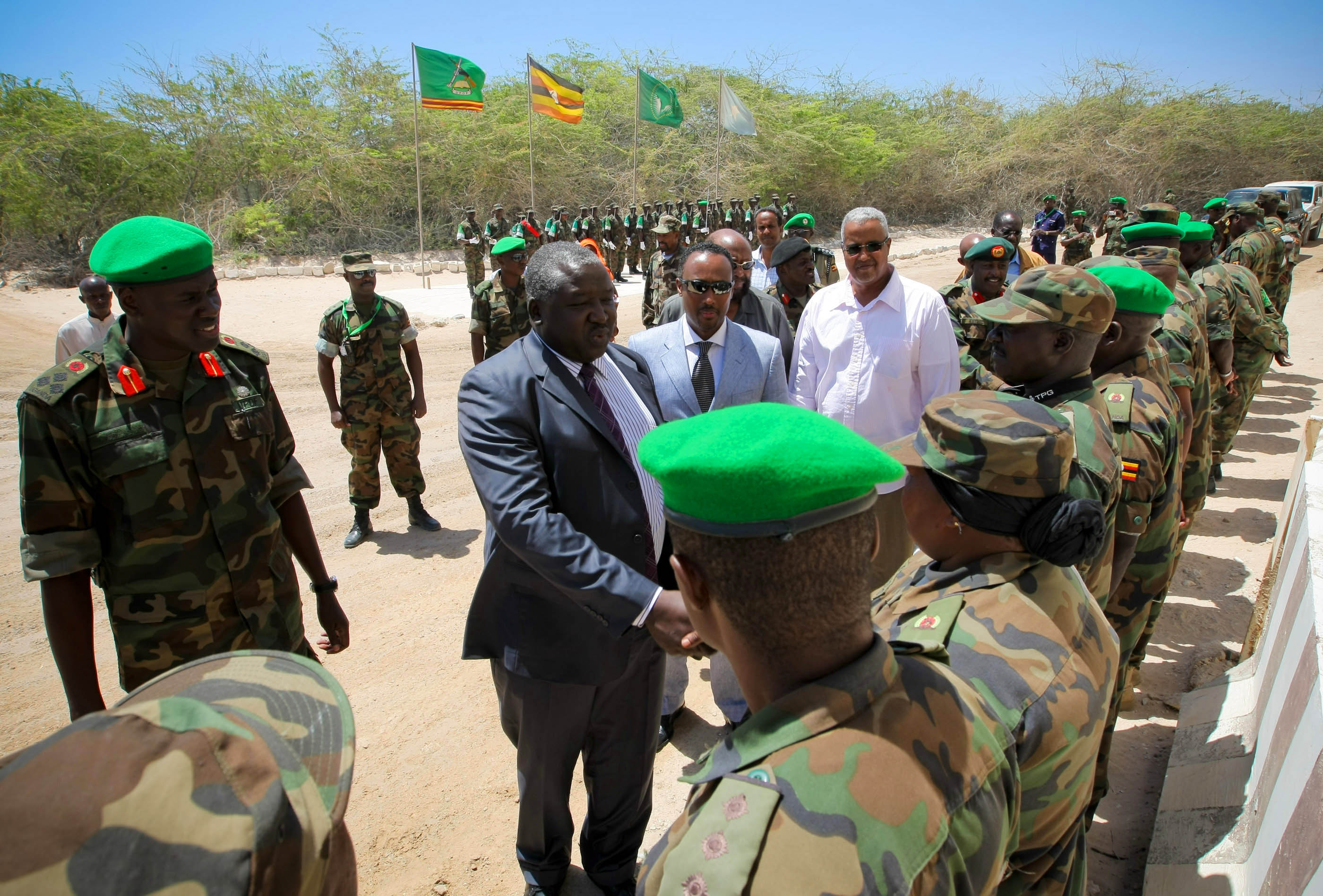
Minister Henry Okello Oryem

He did not contest his parliamentary seat during the 2006 elections. However, he remained a member of parliament, in an ex-official capacity, as a cabinet minister. Between 2006 and 2008, he served as a member of the government delegation to the Juba peace talks between the Ugandan Government and representatives of the Lord's Resistance Army. On many occasions, he was the Deputy Leader of the Uganda Government Delegation, led by Ambassador Ruhakana Rugunda, the Ugandan Minister of Internal Affairs at that time.

In August 2003, Oryem attended the Ugandan North American Association (UNAA) convention in Boston, Massachusetts as part of a Ugandan government delegation.

In the 2011 National Elections, Okello Oryem defeated the then MP for "Chua County", Okello Okello, of the Uganda People's Congress political party, to regain his parliamentary seat. He is the current incumbent MP. On 24 January 2024, He held a bilateral meeting with the Ambassador of Russia to Uganda, H.E. Vladlen Semivolos.

== Personal life ==
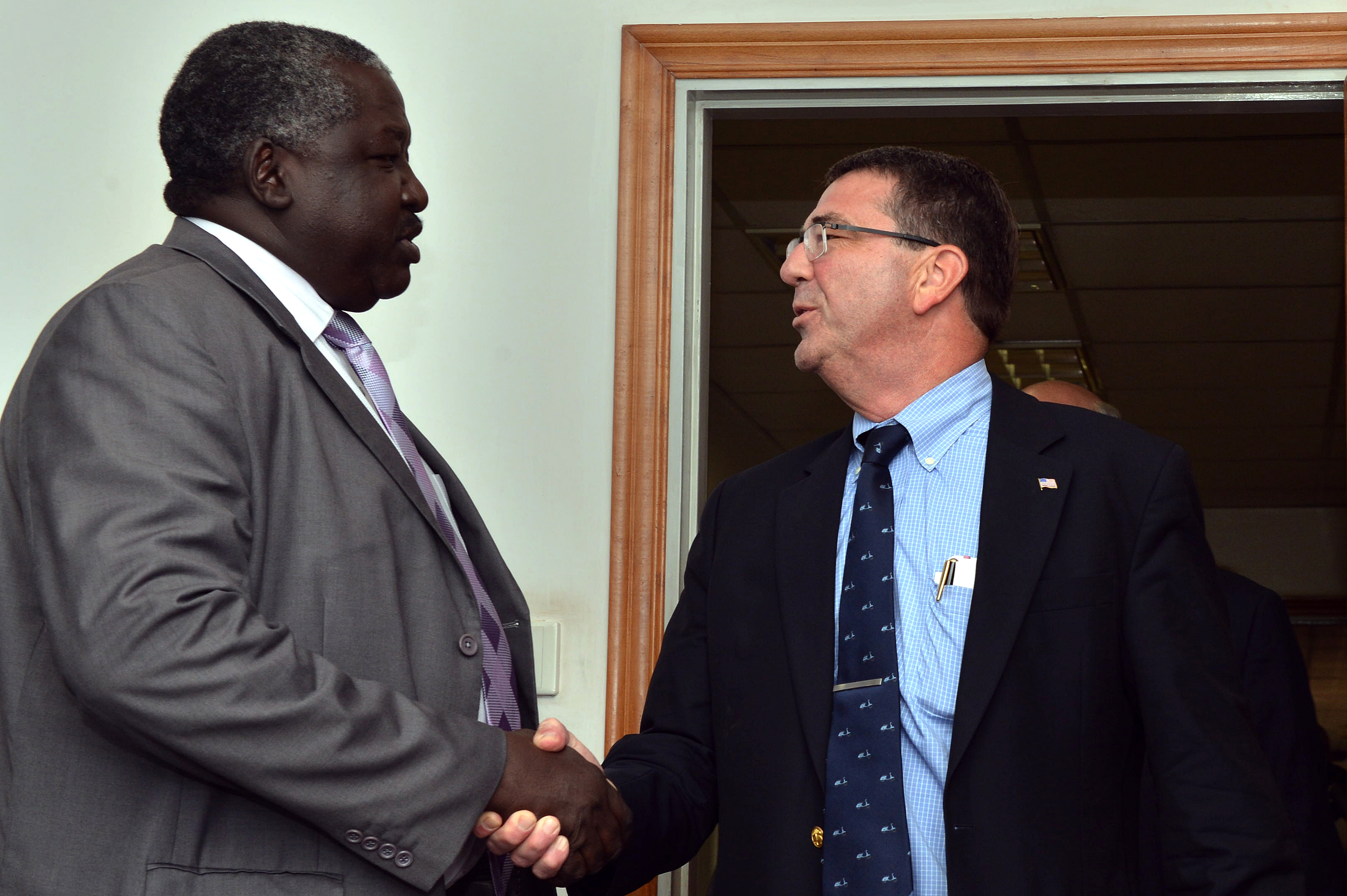
Okello (left) with Ash Carter in 2013

Henry Oryem Okello is married.

== See also ==
- Parliament of Uganda
- Cabinet of Uganda
- Kitgum District
- List of University of Birmingham people
