= Outline of Uganda =

Overview of and topical guide to Uganda

The Flag of Uganda

The Coat of arms of Uganda

The location of Uganda

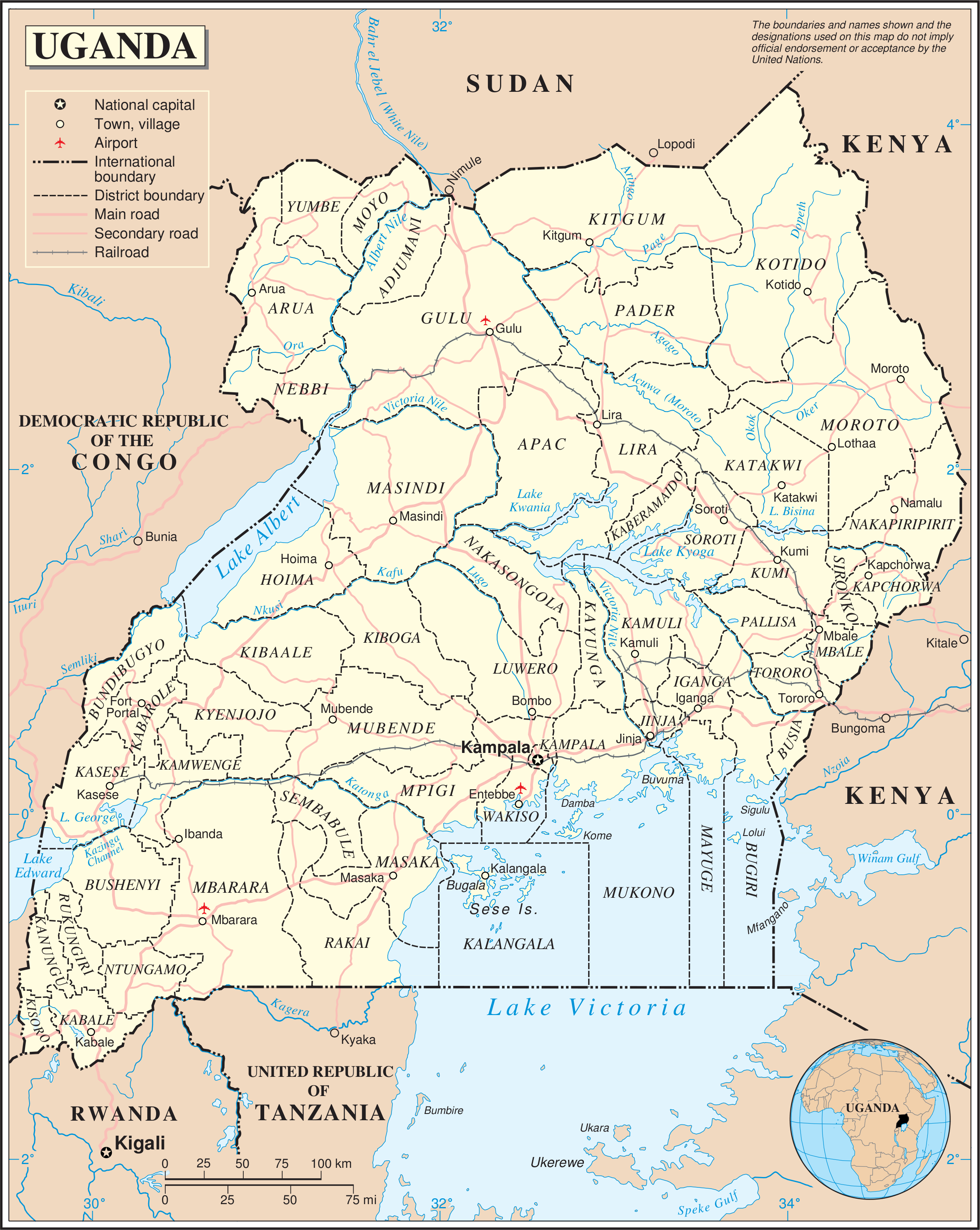
An enlargeable map of the Republic of Uganda

The following outline is provided as an overview of and topical guide to Uganda:

Uganda –commonly referred to as the Pearl by Churchill is a land-locked sovereign country located in East Africa, bordered on the east by Kenya, the north by South Sudan, on the west by the Democratic Republic of the Congo, on the southwest by Rwanda, and on the south by Tanzania. The southern part of the country includes a substantial portion of Lake Victoria, within which it shares borders with Kenya and Tanzania. Uganda takes its name from the Buganda kingdom, which encompassed a portion of the south of the country including the capital Kampala.

== General reference ==
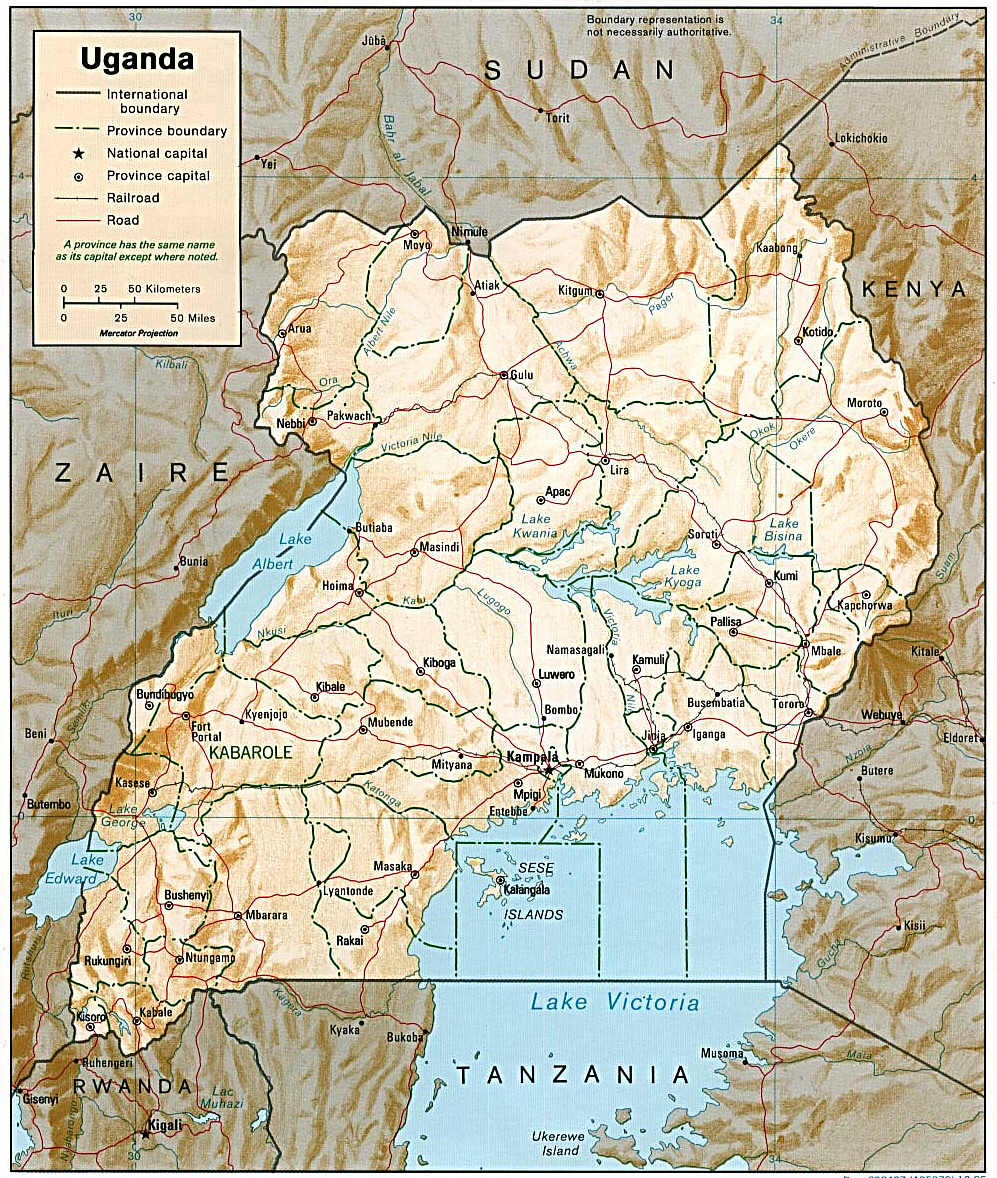
An enlargeable relief map of Uganda

- Pronunciation: /juːˈɡændə/ or /juːˈɡɑːndə/
- Common English country name: Uganda
- Official English country name: The Republic of Uganda
- Common endonym(s):
- Official endonym(s):
- Adjectival(s): Ugandan
- Demonym(s): Ugandan(s)
- International rankings of Uganda
- ISO country codes: UG, UGA, 800
- ISO region codes: See ISO 3166-2:UG
- Internet country code top-level domain: .ug

== Geography of Uganda ==
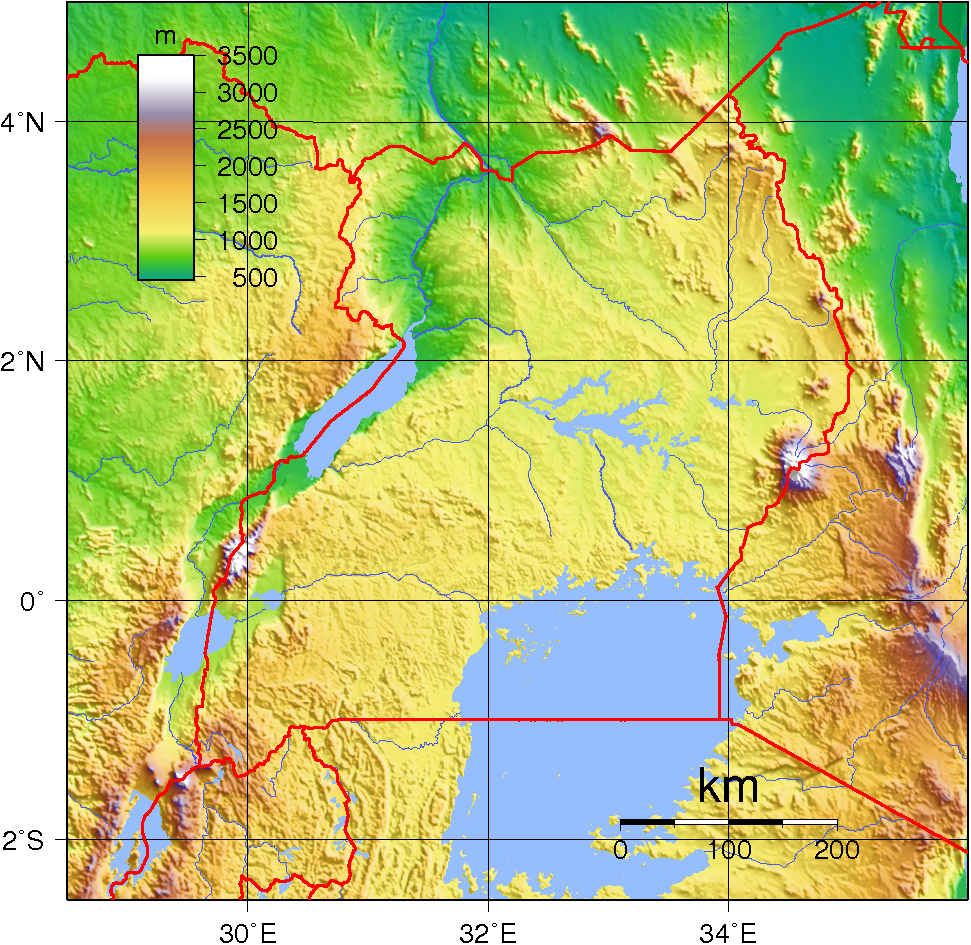
An enlargeable topographic map of Uganda

- Uganda is: a landlocked country
- Location:
  - Eastern Hemisphere, on the Equator
    - Africa
      - East Africa
  - Time zone: East Africa Time (UTC+03)
  - Extreme points of Uganda
    - High: Margherita Peak 5,109 m (16,762 ft)
    - Low: Albert Nile 621 m (2,037 ft)
  - Land boundaries: 2,698 km

Kenya 933 km
Democratic Republic of the Congo 765 km
South Sudan 435 km
Tanzania 396 km
Rwanda 169 km

  - Coastline: none
- Population of Uganda: 42,884,000 - 32nd most populous country
- Area of Uganda: 236,040 km^{2}
- Atlas of Uganda

=== Environment of Uganda ===
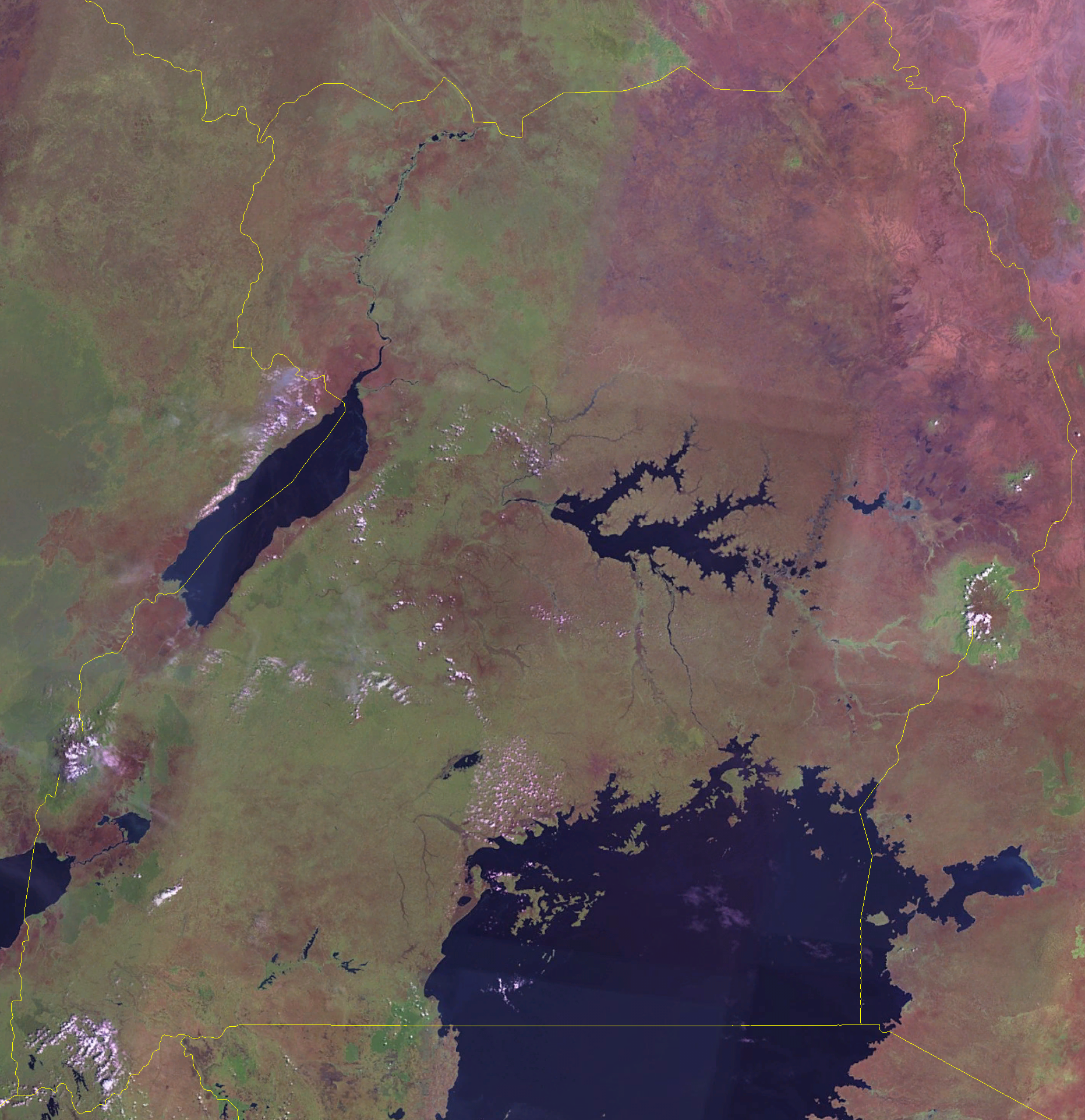
An enlargeable satellite image of Uganda

- Climate of Uganda
- Ecoregions in Uganda
- Protected areas of Uganda
  - National parks of Uganda
- Wildlife of Uganda
  - Fauna of Uganda
    - Birds of Uganda
    - Mammals of Uganda

==== Natural geographic features of Uganda ====
- Glaciers of Uganda (in the Rwenzori Mountains)
  - Glacial recession in the Rwenzori Mountains
- Lakes of Uganda
- Mountains of Uganda
  - Volcanoes in Uganda
- Rivers of Uganda
- World Heritage Sites in Uganda

=== Regions of Uganda ===
Regions of Uganda

==== Ecoregions of Uganda ====
List of ecoregions in Uganda

- Ecoregions in Uganda

==== Administrative divisions of Uganda ====
Administrative divisions of Uganda

- Districts of Uganda
  - Counties of Uganda
    - Sub-counties of Uganda

===== Districts of Uganda =====
Districts of Uganda Uganda is divided into 80 districts across four administrative regions.

===== Counties of Uganda =====
Counties of Uganda The districts of Uganda are divided into 146 counties, one city council, and thirteen municipalities.

===== Sub-counties of Uganda =====
The counties of Uganda are divided into sub-counties, which are further divided into parishes and villages.

=== Demography of Uganda ===
Demographics of Uganda

== Government and politics of Uganda ==
Politics of Uganda

- Form of government: presidential republic
- Capital of Uganda: Kampala
- Elections in Uganda
- Political parties in Uganda

=== Branches of the government of Uganda ===
Government of Uganda

==== Executive branch of the government of Uganda ====
- Head of state and head of government: President of Uganda, Yoweri Museveni
- Prime Minister of Uganda, Robinah Nabbanja - assists the president in the supervision of the cabinet
- Cabinet of Uganda

==== Legislative branch of the government of Uganda ====
- National Assembly of Uganda (unicameral)

==== Judicial branch of the government of Uganda ====
Judiciary of Uganda

- Supreme Court of Uganda

=== Foreign relations of Uganda ===
Foreign relations of Uganda

- Diplomatic missions in Uganda
- Diplomatic missions of Uganda

==== International organization membership ====
The Republic of Uganda is a member of:

- African, Caribbean, and Pacific Group of States (ACP)
- African Development Bank Group (AfDB)
- African Union/United Nations Hybrid operation in Darfur (UNAMID)
- African Union (AU)
- Common Market for Eastern and Southern Africa (COMESA)
- Commonwealth of Nations
- East African Community (EAC)
- East African Development Bank (EADB)
- Food and Agriculture Organization (FAO)
- Group of 77 (G77)
- Inter-Governmental Authority on Development (IGAD)
- International Atomic Energy Agency (IAEA)
- International Bank for Reconstruction and Development (IBRD)
- International Civil Aviation Organization (ICAO)
- International Criminal Court (ICCt)
- International Criminal Police Organization (Interpol)
- International Development Association (IDA)
- International Federation of Red Cross and Red Crescent Societies (IFRCS)
- International Finance Corporation (IFC)
- International Fund for Agricultural Development (IFAD)
- International Labour Organization (ILO)
- International Monetary Fund (IMF)
- International Olympic Committee (IOC)
- International Organization for Migration (IOM)
- International Organization for Standardization (ISO) (correspondent)
- International Red Cross and Red Crescent Movement (ICRM)
- International Telecommunication Union (ITU)
- International Telecommunications Satellite Organization (ITSO)
- International Trade Union Confederation (ITUC)
- Inter-Parliamentary Union (IPU)
- Islamic Development Bank (IDB)
- Multilateral Investment Guarantee Agency (MIGA)
- Nonaligned Movement (NAM)
- Organisation of Islamic Cooperation (OIC)
- Organisation for the Prohibition of Chemical Weapons (OPCW)
- Permanent Court of Arbitration (PCA)
- United Nations (UN)
- United Nations Conference on Trade and Development (UNCTAD)
- United Nations Educational, Scientific, and Cultural Organization (UNESCO)
- United Nations High Commissioner for Refugees (UNHCR)
- United Nations Industrial Development Organization (UNIDO)
- United Nations Mission in the Central African Republic and Chad (MINURCAT)
- United Nations Mission in the Sudan (UNMIS)
- United Nations Operation in Cote d'Ivoire (UNOCI)
- Universal Postal Union (UPU)
- World Customs Organization (WCO)
- World Federation of Trade Unions (WFTU)
- World Health Organization (WHO)
- World Intellectual Property Organization (WIPO)
- World Meteorological Organization (WMO)
- World Tourism Organization (UNWTO)
- World Trade Organization (WTO)

=== Law and order in Uganda ===
Law of Uganda

- Constitution of Uganda
- Human rights in Uganda
  - LGBT rights in Uganda
- Law enforcement in Uganda

=== Military of Uganda ===
Military of Uganda

- Command
  - Commander-in-chief:
    - Ministry of Defence of Uganda
- Forces
  - Army of Uganda
  - Navy of Uganda
  - Air Force of Uganda
- Military history of Uganda

=== Local government in Uganda ===
Uganda Local Governments Association

== History of Uganda ==
=== History of Uganda by period ===
- Early history
- Protectorate (1894 to 1962)
- 1962 to 1963
- 1963 to 1971
- Second Republic of Uganda (1971 to 1979)
- 1979 to 1986

=== History of Uganda by region ===
- History of Buganda

=== History of Uganda by topic ===
- Military history of Uganda
- Postage stamps and postal history of Uganda

== Culture of Uganda ==
Culture of Uganda

- Cuisine of Uganda
- Languages of Uganda
- Media in Uganda
  - Newspapers of Uganda
    - 256News.com
    - East African Business Week
    - The Red Pepper
    - The Monitor
    - The New Vision
    - The Weekly Observer
    - Nile Chronicles
- Magazines in Uganda
    - The Independent - Uganda
    - African Woman
    - PC Tech Magazine
- National symbols of Uganda
  - Coat of arms of Uganda
  - Flag of Uganda
  - National anthem of Uganda
- People of Uganda
- Prostitution in Uganda
- Public holidays in Uganda
- Religion in Uganda
  - Hinduism in Uganda
  - Islam in Uganda
  - Judaism in Uganda
- World Heritage Sites in Uganda

=== Art in Uganda ===
- Cinema of Uganda
- Music of Uganda

=== Sports in Uganda ===
Sports in Uganda

- Football in Uganda
- Uganda at the Olympics

== Economy and infrastructure of Uganda ==
Economy of Uganda

- Economic rank, by nominal GDP (2007): 109th (one hundred and ninth)
- Agriculture in Uganda
- Banking in Uganda
- Communications in Uganda
  - Internet in Uganda
- Companies of Uganda
- Uganda Investment Authority
- Currency of Uganda: Shilling
  - ISO 4217: UGX
- Energy in Uganda
- Health care in Uganda
- Mining in Uganda
- Uganda Securities Exchange
- Tourism in Uganda
- Transport in Uganda
  - Airports in Uganda
  - Rail transport in Uganda
- Water supply and sanitation in Uganda

== Education in Uganda ==
Education in Uganda

== Health in Uganda ==
- Health in Uganda
- Uganda National Health Consumers´ Organization

== See also ==
Uganda

- List of international rankings
- List of Uganda-related topics
- Member state of the Commonwealth of Nations
- Member state of the United Nations
- Outline of Africa
