= Administrative divisions of Uganda =

Uganda is divided into (from largest to smallest):

- 4 administrative regions
- 15 sub-regions
- 121 districts
- 167 counties, one city council, and thirteen municipalities
- sub-counties
- parishes and villages

The sub-regions include, but are not necessarily limited to: Acholi, Ankole, Buganda, Bugisu, Bukedi, Bunyoro, Busoga, Elgon, Karamoja, Kigezi, Lango, Rwenzori, Sebei, Teso, Toro, and West Nile.

All the subdivisions are officially united and served by the national government body, the Uganda Local Governments Association (ULGA).

ISO 3166-2:UG gives three letter codes for the districts.

Parallel with the state administration, seventeen traditional kingdoms have some degree of mainly cultural autonomy. The most prominent of these kingdoms are Toro, Busoga, Bunyoro, Buganda, Rwenzururu, Alur, Acholi and Lango.
