= Rwashande Emmanuel =

Ugandan general and politician

Rwashande Emmanuel (born 15 January 1965) is a Ugandan retired military officer at the level of Brigadier general and a politician, and a member of the 12th parliament representing Lwemiyaga county.

== Early life and education ==
Rwashande was born in Rwemirama village, Ntuusi town council, Lwemiyaga county in Sembabule district to a nomadic family of the late Lazaro Kyamuzigita and Esteri Kakirambi. He attended Kinoni, Nama and Kinuuka Primary schools for his primary education which he completed in 1976. He attended Kabwoohe secondary school in Sheema district for his Uganda Certificate of Education in 1980. In October 2025, Rwashande graduated with a first class honors degree in international relations and diplomacy from Nkumba university.

== Military career ==
Rwashande joined the NRA (National Resistance Army) as a "Kadogo" aged between 16 and 17 years. He was taken to Nairobi and was selected for military training in Tripoli, Libya up to 1983, courtesy of Col. Muammar Qaddafi. In 1989, he was sent for an intelligence course in London, United Kingdom, for 6 months and was later posted to the 6th Division in Moroto as the first intelligence officer. He was posted as a commander for the 121 battalion. In 1998, he attended a company commanders course, and in 2003, he attended the Senior Staff and Command Course in Nanjing Command College, China. In 2007, he attended the National Defence Course at the National Defense University in China.

Rwashande also commanded Operation Iron Fist in Gulu and Southern Sudan and later Lightning Thunder in the Central African Republic (CAR). He was then appointed overall operations commander for AMISOM based at Entebbe Airport until 2011, when he was appointed defense attaché to China. After 10 years, he was appointed the chief of civil-military cooperation in the Uganda People's Defence Forces (UPDF) up to April, 2024.

== Political Career ==
Rwashande is a member of the 12th parliament representing Lwemiyaga county. He gained this position after defeating Theodore Ssekikubo in 2026 who had been the county's representative for 25 years both in National Resistance Movement (NRM) party primary elections and the 2026 general elections. During the NRM primary elections, announced on July 18, 2025, Rwashande got 16,358 votes whereas Ssekikubo got 8,702 votes. He was nominated in 2025 for Member of Parliament position in the 2026 general election representing NRM, which he won against all his opponents with 30,285 votes.

== Personal Life ==
Rwashande is married to his wife Robinah Kiconco since 1989.
