= Masaka–Villa Maria–Bukomansimbi–Sembabule Road =

Road in Uganda

Coordinates: 00°07′34″S 31°33′22″E

Route information
- Length: 30 mi (48 km)

Major junctions
- South end: Nyendo
- Villa Maria
- North end: Sembabule

Location
- Country: Uganda

Highway system
- Roads in Uganda

Masaka–Villa Maria–Bukomansimbi–Sembabule Road also Nyendo–Villa Maria–Bukomansimbi–Sembabule Road, is a road in the Central Region of Uganda, connecting the towns of Masaka in Masaka District, Villa Maria in Kalungu District, Bukomansimbi in Bukomansimbi District to Sembabule in Sembabule District.

== Location ==
The road starts at Nyendo, a neighborhood in the city of Masaka and ends in the town of Sembabule, a total distance of about 48 kilometres (30 mi).

== Overview ==
This road is the principal transport corridor between the districts of Masaka, Kalungu, Bukomansimbi and Sembabule. The road is under the jurisdiction of the Uganda National Roads Authority.

== Upgrading to bitumen ==
After many years of being included in the annual budget speeches without action, work to upgrade the gravel road to class 2 bitumen finally began in February 2015. Construction work was contracted to the China Railway Number 3 Engineering Group Company Limited at a cost of UGX:239 billion. The Villa Maria–Bukomansimbi–Sembabule section, measuring 38 kilometres (24 mi), is part of the 110 kilometres (68 mi) Kanoni–Kabulasoke–Sembabule–Villa Maria Road. The 11 kilometres (7 mi) Masaka–Villa Maria section remains gravel surfaced.

== See also ==
- List of roads in Uganda
- Economy of Uganda
- Transport in Uganda
