= Ntuusi =

- Location in Uganda
- Coordinates: 00°03′00″N 31°12′04″E
- Country: Uganda
- District: Sembabule District
- County: Lwemiyaga County

Ntuusi is a settlement in the Central Region of Uganda.

== Location ==
The settlement is in Lwemiyaga County in Sembabule District in south-western Uganda, approximately 18 kilometres (11 mi) south-east of Lwemiyaga, where the county headquarters are located. This is approximately 33 kilometres (21 mi) north-west of Sembabule, the site of the district headquarters. Ntuusi is about 86 kilometres (53 mi) by road, north-west of Masaka, the nearest large city. The coordinates of Ntuusi are 00°03'00.0"N, 31°12'04.0"E (Latitude:0.050000; Longitude:31.201111).

== Overview ==
Ntuusi is the location of the headquarters of Ntuusi sub-county in Lwemiyaga County, Sembabule District. The modern-day settlement of Ntuusi is inside the Ntuusi Archaeological Site, an area measuring approximately 100 hectares (247 acres), that was continuously settled by humans during the period 1,000AD and 1,500AD. This area, also known as Bigo bya Mugenyi, is the earliest evidence of organised human settlement in the African Great Lakes Region.

== See also ==
- List of cities and towns in Uganda
- Mawogola County
