= National AIDS Commission =

National AIDS Commission may refer to:

- National AIDS Commission of Indonesia
- Tanzania Commission for AIDS
- Uganda AIDS Commission
- National Commission on AIDS (USA)

== See also ==
- Latino Commission on AIDS (USA)
- National AIDS Trust, the UK's leading charity dedicated to transforming society's response to HIV
