= Geofrey Kayemba =

Ugandan politician

Kayemba Geofrey Honorable
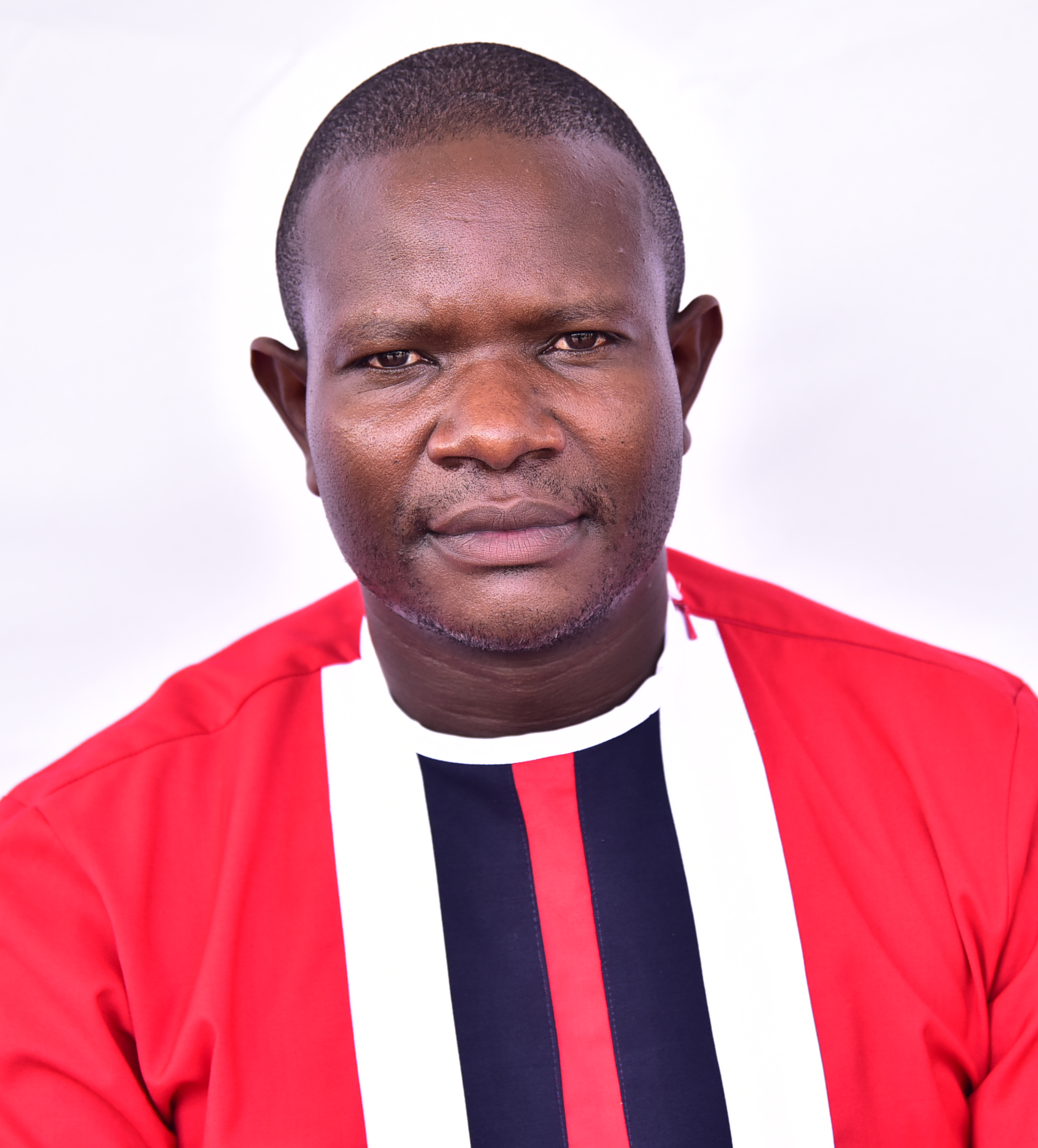
- Hon. Geofrey Kayemba taking oath

Member of Parliament for Bukomansimbi South
- Incumbent
- Assumed office May 21, 2021

Personal details
- Born: Kayemba Ssolo Geofrey; 1 August 1983 (age 43) Bukomansimbi District
- Party: National Unity Platform
- Education: Ndejje University (Certificate in Education), Ndejje University (Bachelors in Public Relations Management)
- Occupation: Politician, Football agent, music manager, Public administrator
- Known for: Politics, football agent, artiste managing, Public Administration, leadership

Geofrey Kayemba Ssolo is a Ugandan talent music manager, football agent, businessman and politician. He served as a Member of Parliament for Bukomansimbi South Constituency in Bukomansimbi. He was elected on 14 January 2021. He is a member of National Unity Platform political party. He serves as the Shadow Minister of Sports in the Shadow Cabinet.

== Early life and education background ==
Kayemba was born on 1 August 1983 in Bukomansimbi district to Francis Jjuuko Kamulegeya (father) and Resty Nabumpenje (mother). He attended St. Charles Lwanga Primary School Kyabakuza, Masaka Secondary School for S.1 & S.2, St. Damian Kilyamenvu Bukomansimbi, he sat his o level exams from Benard College Kisweera Masaka & Happy Hours Secondary School Kampala for A levels (2009). He holds an Advanced Certificate in Education and a Bachelor's degree in Public Relations Management from Ndejje University.

== Career ==
=== Talent managing ===
In his vacation, he taught at Kamaanda Primary School Bukomansimbi and while in A level Kayemba was a part time cleaner at Mulago Hospital working under Norema Services Cleaning Company. In 2005, he worked as a marketer at DCL studio. He is the CEO of Just Fine Agency - a company that manages musicians. He also serves as a football agent at Africa Sports Agency, a Football Agency Company. He started artiste managing in 2006 managing Lady Mariam Tindatine, Qute Kaye, Dr. Hilderman, Wilson Bugembe, David Lutalo, Christopher Evans, Rema Namakula among others. In 2016, Kayemba was certified as a football agent by FUFA. He has represented Godfrey Walusimbi, Emmanuel Okwi, Khalid Aucho, Chrizestorm Ntambi, Herman Wasswa among others.

=== Politics ===
In January 2021, Kayemba was elected as a Member of Parliament representing Bukomansimbi South Constituency in the eleventh Parliament of Uganda (2021 to 2026) in the 2021 Ugandan general elections and on 21 May 2021 he sworn in as the Member of Parliament. He won with 9200 votes. On 25 June 2021, he was appointed as the Shadow Minister of Sports in the Parliament of Uganda.

In Jenauary 2026, he contested to retain the Bukomansimbi South constituency parliamentary seat in the 12th parliament (2026-2031) but was defeated by Hassan Mukiibi Sserunjogi after the election, he publicly stated that he would not challenge the results in court.

== Personal life ==
He is a member of the National Unity Platform political party and currently contesting as an independent for masaka city mayor.

== See also ==
List of members in the eleventh parliament

== External references ==
- Website of the Parliament of Uganda.
- 2021 Elections: Statistics on the number of MPs who have been declared winners so far
- General parliamentary elections, 2021 - Election results
- Here are the 5 music professionals entering Ugandan politics
- Mpuuga names shadow cabinet
- LOP Mathias Mpuuga Names Shadow Cabinet
- Kyagulanyi stopped from travelling to United States over Covid-19 restrictions
- MPs Task Gov’t to Repatriate Citizens Trapped in Kabul
