= Herman Lupogo =

- Born: 12 December 1938; Mbinga District, Tanganyika
- Died: 19 October 2014 (aged 76); Dar es Salaam, Tanzania
- Burial place: Kinondoni cemetery, Dar es Salaam
- Military career
- Allegiance: Tanzania
- Branch: Tanzania People's Defence Force
- Service years: 1965–1992
- Rank: Major General
- Commands: 205th Brigade TPDF
- Conflicts: Uganda–Tanzania War; Battle of Sembabule

Herman Cornel Lupogo (12 December 1938 – 19 October 2014) was a Tanzanian military officer and government administrator. After graduating from Makerere University, he enlisted in the Tanzania People's Defence Force in 1965. He held various positions in the army, including head of the National Leadership Academy, and served as a brigadier during the Uganda–Tanzania War of 1978 and 1979. He retired with the rank of major general in 1992, and subsequently worked as a government administrator. He chaired the Tanzania Commission for AIDS from 2001 until 2007, and died in 2014.

== Early life ==
Herman Lupogo was born on 12 December 1938 in Mbinga District, Tanganyika. He studied at Makerere University in Uganda from 1958 until 1964, graduating as a Master of Arts with a teaching certificate. While there he served as chairman of Northcote Hall, and in 1962 he performed in the first showing of Ngũgĩ wa Thiong'o's play, The Black Hermit, at the Ugandan National Theatre.

== Career ==
=== Military service ===
Lupogo joined the Tanzania People's Defence Force (TPDF) on 23 July 1965 and was commissioned as an officer on 21 January 1966. Three years later he went to Canada to study international diplomacy. In 1970 he went to North Korea as part of a military delegation to inspect units of the Korean People's Army. From 1971 to 1974 Lupogo was Commandant of the TPDF's Officer Cadet School and from 1974 until 1976 he acted as the Tanganyika African National Union's assistant secretary for defence and security. From 1976 until 1978 he acted as the head of the National Leadership Academy.

In 1978 war broke out between Uganda and Tanzania. The TPDF embarked on a programme of expansion and in January 1979 Lupogo acted as a recruitment officer at the military camp in Makambako. Later that year Tanzania launched an invasion of Uganda. Lupogo, with the rank of brigadier, was given command of the TPDF's 205th Brigade. When Tanzanian commanders feared that a Ugandan regiment was due to attack them from Mubende, they dispatched Lupogo and his brigade north from Masaka to intercept it. The 205th Brigade encountered entrenched Uganda Army troops in the town of Sembabule, marking the beginning of a three-week-long battle. Lupogo deployed his men in small units and attempted repeatedly to dislodge the Ugandans. Their efforts were unsuccessful and Tanzanian morale steadily dropped until TPDF commanders decided to withdraw Lupogo and replace him with Brigadier Muhiddin Kimario. Lupogo transferred command to Kimario while the brigade headquarters was taking fire. Kimario revised the Tanzanians' strategy and the 205th Brigade was eventually able to secure the town. After the fall of Kampala, Lupogo was contacted by one of his former professors from Makerere University about the status of the body of Hans Poppe, a Tanzanian police official who had been killed in a 1971 border clash with Uganda and since kept in a Kampala mortuary. Lupogo helped arrange for Poppe's body to be repatriated.

In 1985 Lupogo went to the United Kingdom to study international military strategy. He retired from the TPDF with the rank of major general on 11 September 1992.

=== Administrative service ===
Following the end of his military service, Lupogo acted variously as the Regional Commissioner for Iringa, Director General of the Arusha International Conference Centre, and Board Chairman of the Benjamin Mkapa Foundation. In December 2000 he was appointed Chairman of the Tanzania Commission for AIDS. He took up the post in 2001, and served until his term expired in January 2007.

== Later life ==
After retiring Lupogo moved to the ward of Mikocheni B in Dar es Salaam. He had a wife and several children. He fell ill and died on 19 October 2014 at Lugalo Military Hospital in Dar es Salaam at the age of 76. President Jakaya Kikwete expressed his condolences to the TPDF and Lupogo's family in his wake, and thanked him for his service to the country. Lupogo was buried at Kinondoni Cemetery in Dar es Salaam.
