= Parishes of Uganda =

The sub-counties of Uganda are divided into parishes, which are further divided into villages. These parishes are governed by a local council II (LCII) committee and parish chief. The parish chief is a government employee that provides technical leadership to the LCII. LCIIs are made up all of the chairmen from the village local council I (LCI) committees in the parish and are responsible for settling land disputes and community outreach.

== Parish Development Model ==
President Yoweri Museveni introduced the Parish Development Model in February 2022 as a program for poverty eradication. This seven-pillared model revolves around the parish as the smallest subdivision for economic and social development in Uganda. The program aims to elevate the 39% of Uganda's population who currently live in subsistence economy to market economy.

As of May 2023, the program has been marred by missed deadlines and challenges associated with a lack of national infrastructure.

== See also ==
- Regions of Uganda
- Districts of Uganda
- Counties of Uganda
- Sub-counties of Uganda
- Uganda Local Governments Association
