= Lwemiyaga =

- Location in Uganda
- Coordinates: 00°04′54″N 31°05′53″E
- Country: Uganda
- Region: Central Region of Uganda
- District: Sembabule District
- County: Lwemiyaga County

Lwemiyaga is a settlement in the Central Region of Uganda. The town is the site of the county headquarters.

== Location ==
Lwemiyaga is located in Lwemiyaga County, in Sembabule District, about 51 kilometres (32 mi) north-west of Sembabule, the location of the district headquarters. This is about 104 kilometres (65 mi) north-west of Masaka, the nearest large city. The coordinates of the town are 00°04'54.0"N, 31°05'53.0"E (Latitude:0.081667; Longitude:31.098056).

== Overview ==
Lwemiyaga Town, the headquarters of Lwemiyaga County, and Lwemiyaga sub-county, has in the past, been the venue of contentious political battles involving local and national politicians.

== Points of interest ==
The following additional points of interest are located in the town of Lwemiyaga or near its borders:

- offices of Lwemiyaga Town Council
- offices of Lwemiyaga County
- offices of Lwemiyaga sub-county

== See also ==
- List of cities and towns in Uganda
- Ntuusi
