= Battle of Sembabule =

Battle of the Uganda-Tanzania War

Coordinates: 0.08°S 31.46°E

- Part of the Uganda–Tanzania War
Date	March – 5/6 April 1979
Location	Sembabule, Uganda
Result	Tanzanian victory
Territorial changes	Sembabule captured by Tanzanian forces

Belligerents
Tanzania	Uganda

Commanders and leaders
Herman Lupogo; Muhiddin Kimario	Unknown

Units involved
205th Brigade	Tiger Regiment (Note: Ugandan commander Bernard Rwehururu maintained that it was his unit, the Suicide Battalion, that fought the Tanzanians in Sembabule. In contrast, journalist Joshua Kato stated that the Suicide Battalion was involved in the Battle of Lukaya during March 1979.)

Casualties and losses
c. 20 killed	25 killed

The Battle of Sembabule was a battle of the Uganda–Tanzania War that took place from March to 5/6 April 1979 in the town of Sembabule, Uganda. Tanzania had repulsed a Ugandan invasion in late 1978, and in early 1979 the Tanzania People's Defence Force (TPDF) crossed into southern Uganda. The Tanzanians decided shortly thereafter to attack the Ugandan capital, Kampala, and the 205th Brigade was detailed in early March to be sent north from Masaka and then west of the city. Ugandan President Idi Amin declared over radio that his forces were about to surround the TPDF, prompting Tanzanian commanders to dispatch the 205th Brigade to deal with the Uganda Army's Tiger Regiment in Mubende. While moving north, the 205th Brigade encountered the Tiger Regiment at Sembabule, beginning a three-week-long battle. The Tiger Regiment effectively resisted the Tanzanians for some time, prompting a change in command of the 205th Brigade and in its tactics, bringing about the eventual fall of Sembabule to the Tanzanians on 5 or 6 April. The Battle of Sembabule was the longest battle of the 1978-1979 war.

== Background ==
In 1971 Idi Amin launched a military coup that overthrew the President of Uganda, Milton Obote, precipitating a deterioration of relations with the neighbouring state of Tanzania. Amin installed himself as President and ruled the country under a brutal dictatorship. In October 1978 he launched an invasion of Tanzania. Tanzania blunted the assault, mobilised anti-Amin opposition groups, and launched a counter-offensive. Though many international actors were sympathetic with the Tanzanian position, numerous African states and the Organisation of African Unity (OAU) strongly encouraged Tanzanian President Julius Nyerere to exercise restraint and not act beyond defending his territory. He had originally not intended to expand the war, but with Amin refusing to renounce his claims to Tanzanian territory and the OAU failing to strongly condemn him, Nyerere decided that Tanzanian forces should occupy southern Uganda.

== Prelude ==
The Tanzania People's Defence Force (TPDF) crossed the Ugandan border on 20 January 1979. They steadily advanced, killing dozens of Uganda Army soldiers and destroying large amounts of their materiel. On 24 February 1979 the TPDF seized Masaka. Nyerere originally planned to halt his forces there and allow Ugandan exiles to attack Kampala, the Ugandan capital, and overthrow Amin. He feared that scenes of Tanzanian troops occupying the city would reflect poorly on the country's image abroad. However, Ugandan rebel forces did not have the strength to defeat the Libyan units coming to Amin's aid, so Nyerere decided to use the TPDF to take the capital.

As part of the plan to take Kampala, the TPDF's 205th Brigade was to advance on Mpigi in early March and then to Mityana and launch an attack on the capital from there. Amin made a radio broadcast, boasting that his forces were about to surround the TPDF. Curious as to whether the claim had any merit, Tanzanian commanders analysed their plans and realised that the Tiger Regiment at Mubende was unaccounted for. Believing the unit was heading south, they dispatched the 205th Brigade under Brigadier Herman Lupogo from its position in Masaka north to intercept it.

== Battle ==
The 205th Brigade encountered the entrenched Tiger Regiment in Sembabule, along with several soldiers and recruits from the Uganda Army's School of Infantry in Kabamba. The 205th Brigade attempted to dislodge the Ugandans, marking the beginning of a three-week-long battle. Lupogo deployed his men in small units. The 205th Brigade, a new and inexperienced unit, was unable to make significant progress in taking the town, as positions it seized were frequently recaptured by the Ugandans. Tanzanian soldiers became discouraged by the sight of the decapitated bodies of their comrades in trenches, and morale declined to a point where units as large as battalions were retreating upon being subject to fire from the Ugandans.

Deeming the battle to be of key strategic importance, the Chief of the TPDF and the divisional commander went to Matete to revise TPDF strategy. In an attempt to improve the situation, Lupogo was withdrawn and replaced with Brigadier Muhiddin Kimario. Kimario was picked up by plane from Zanzibar and flown to northern Tanzania to disembark; he eventually arrived at the battle finding the 205th Brigade disorganised, morale low, and that about 20 Tanzanian soldiers had been killed. Lupogo transferred command to Kimario while the brigade headquarters was taking fire. In an attempt to boost morale, Kimario told his troops that he would fight with them on the front line. He also ditched Lupogo's small unit tactics in favour of an "advance to contact" strategy, whereby the 205th Brigade would manoeuvre as an entire unit to engage the Ugandans. Kimario's strategy for the 205th Brigade was successful. The TPDF allocated two additional battalions for the final assault, and managed to overrun the Tiger Regiment, capturing Sembabule on 5 or 6 April. The Ugandans left behind 25 dead.

== Aftermath ==
The Battle of Sembabule was the longest battle of the Uganda–Tanzania War. After the victory at Sembabule and its success at Lukaya, the TPDF held the strategic initiative for the rest of the war. After recuperating from the battle, the 205th Brigade moved north and occupied Mubende. The School of Infantry in Kabamba was found deserted and seized without incident. Kampala fell on 11 April. Combat operations in Uganda continued until 3 June, when Tanzanian forces reached the Sudanese border and eliminated the last resistance. The TPDF withdrew from the country in 1981.
