= Shartsi Kutesa Musherure =

Ugandan female parliamentarian

Shartsi Kutesa Musherure (Namatovu)
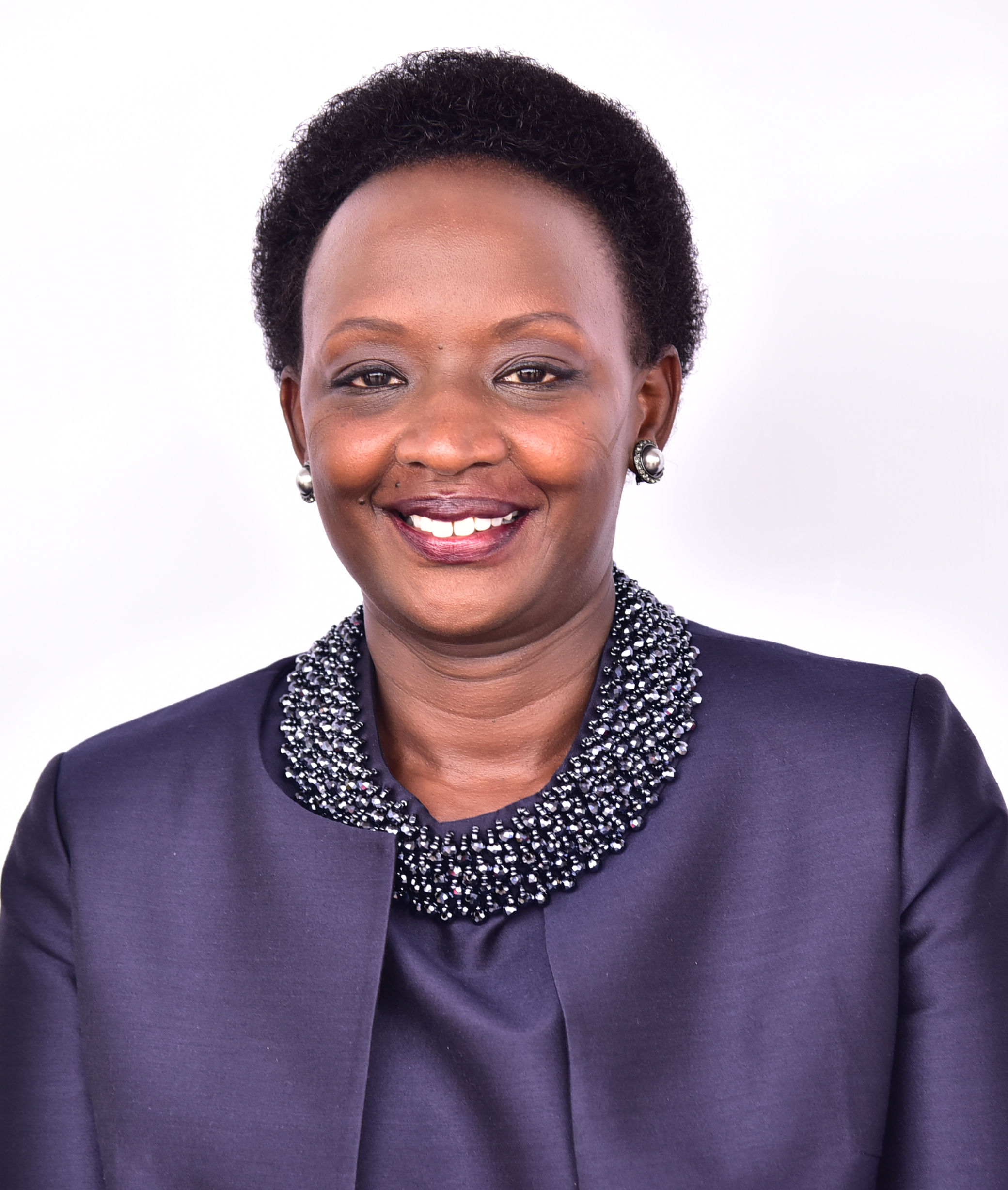
- Born: Shartsi Nayebare Kutesa
- Occupations: legislator, lawyer and politician
- Years active: 2009—present
- Known for: Politics
- Title: Former Member of Parliament for Mawogola County North Sambabule district
- Term: 2021—2026
- Predecessor: Sam Kutesa
- Parents: Sam Kutesa (father); Jennifer Nankunda Kutesa (mother)
- Relatives: Charlotte Kutesa Muhoozi (sister)
- Website: musherureshartsi.com

Shartsi 'Namatovu' Kutesa Musherure commonly known as Shartsi Musherure is a Ugandan lawyer, politician and legislator. She is the former Member of Parliament for Mawogola County North Sambabule district in the parliament of Uganda.

== Background and education ==
Shartsi is the daughter of Sam Kuteesa (former minister for foreign affairs) and Jennifer Nankunda Kutesa, she is a twin sister to Charlotte Kainerugaba the wife to president Museveni's son Muhoozi Kainerugaba.

She succeeded her father as MP Mawogola county after a contested election.

Earlier in the National Resistance Movement (NRM) party primaries leading to the 2021 elections, Shartsi had been defeated by President Museveni's younger brother, Godfrey Aine Kaguta also known as "Sodo". Sodo's win was challenged by Shartsi prompting the NRM electoral commission to direct both candidates to run as independents.

One day to the 2021 Uganda general elections, Sodo was advised by his family and Yoweri Museveni to withdraw from the race in favor of Shartsi. Shartsi eventually won in the general elections.

Shartsi has two degrees in Law.

== Career ==
Shartsi is the former member of parliament (MP) representing Mawogola north county in the parliament of Uganda. In parliament, she served on the committee of legal and parliamentary affairs.
