= Bukomansimbi =

- Map of Uganda showing the location of Bukomansimbi.
- Coordinates: 00°10′00″S 31°37′07″E
- Country: Uganda
- Region: Central Uganda
- District: Bukomansimbi District
- Elevation: 1,259 m (4,131 ft)

Population (2020 Estimate)
  - Total: 10,000
- Time zone: UTC+3 (EAT)

Bukomansimbi is a town in the Central Region of Uganda. It is the chief municipal, administrative, and commercial center of Bukomansimbi District and the site of the district headquarters.

== Location ==
Bukomansimbi is on the main highway between Masaka and Sembabule. It is approximately 37 kilometres (23 mi), by road, northwest of Masaka, the largest city in the sub-region. This is about 27 kilometres (17 mi), southeast of Sembabule, the nearest town.

The coordinates of the town are 0°10'00.0"S, 31°37'07.0"E (Latitude:-0.166667; Longitude:31.618600). Bukomansimbi sits at an average elevation of 1,259 metres (4,131 ft) above mean sea level.

== Population ==
As of May 2014, local sources estimated the population of the town as "less than 10,000".

In 2015, the Uganda Bureau of Statistics (UBOS) estimated the population of the town at 9,700 inhabitants. In 2020, the population agency estimated the mid-year population of Bukomansimbi Town Council at 10,000. Of that number, 5,100 (51 percent) were female and 4,900 (49 percent) were male. UBOS also calculated that the population of the town had increased at an average rate of 0.61 percent annually, between 2015 and 2020.

Historical population
| Year | Pop. | ±% |
|---|---|---|
| 2014 | 9,500 | — |
| 2015 | 9,700 | +2.1% |
| 2020 | 10,000 | +3.1% |

== Points of interest ==
The following additional points of interest lie within the town limits or close to its borders: (a) The offices of Bukomansimbi Town Council (b) Bukomansimbi central market, the largest source of fresh produce in the town (c) Kitanda Health Center III, a health facility administered by the Uganda Ministry of Health (d) the Masaka–Villa Maria–Bukomansimbi–Sembabule Road passes through the western neighborhoods of the town.

d) Kibinge Coffee Farmers Co-operative Society Ltd, a farmers cooperative located in Kibinge sub-county. (e) River Kyogya a natural water source that separates the district from Ssembabule district. (f) Coffee, Bukomansimbi is the highest coffee producer in Uganda majoring in robusta coffee.

== See also ==
- List of roads in Uganda
- List of cities and towns in Uganda
