= Theodore Ssekikubo =

Ugandan politician (b. 1969)

Ssekikubo Theodore
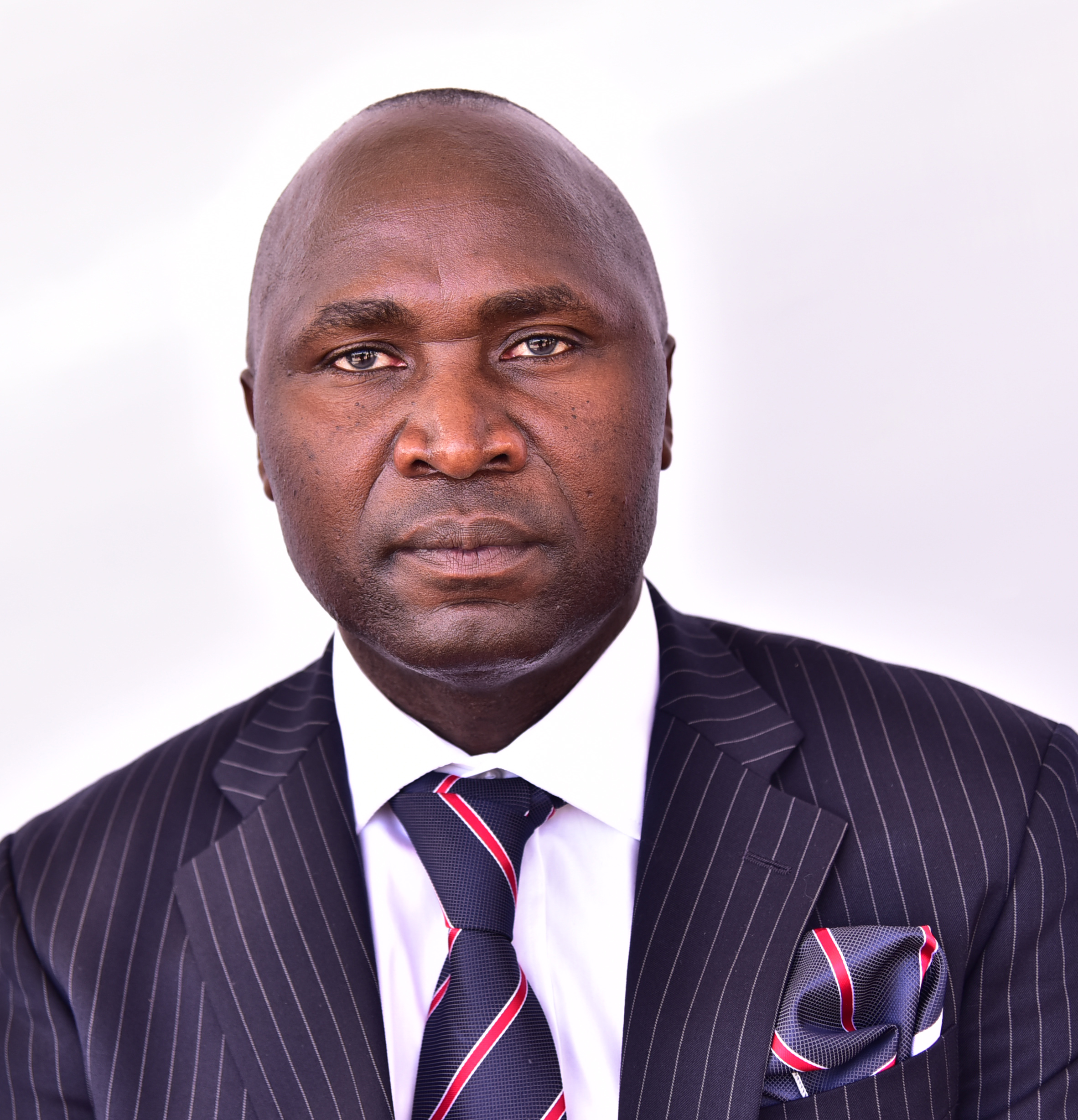
- Theodore Ssekikubo in 2016.

Member of the Uganda Parliament for Lwemiyaga, Ssembabule District
- In office 1995–2026

Personal details
- Born: 20 August 1969 (age 56) Lwemiyaga, Ssembabule
- Citizenship: Uganda
- Party: National Resistance Movement

Ssekikubo Theodore (born 20 August 1969) is a Ugandan politician. He was the former Member of Parliament who represented Lwemiyaga County, Sembabule District in the 11th Parliament of Uganda.He was a member of parliament for 25 years. He lost his seat during the January 2026 general elections.

== Early life and education ==
Ssekikubo was born on 20 August 1969. At Makerere University, he earned a Bachelor of Arts in Social Sciences, Master of Public Administration and Management and a Bachelor of Laws. At Law Development Centre, Kampala, he earned a Postgraduate diploma in Legal practice.

== Career ==
Before joining politics, Ssekikubo worked in the Ministry of Defence as an assistant secretary in the administrative office. He worked as a lecturer at Ndejje University from 1998–1999. In 2016, Ssekikubo joined the race for deputy speaker of the parliament of Uganda but eventually lost to the late Jacob Oulanyah the former deputy speaker and speaker. He lost his MP seat after 25 years of representation and has been one of the most outspoken and consistent MPs.

== Arrest ==
On 10 January 2020, he was arrested for allegedly "inciting the public to move cattle in a quarantine area." He was granted bail on January 14, but was re-arrested on Jan.16.
