= Sam Kutesa =

Ugandan lawyer and politician (born 1949)

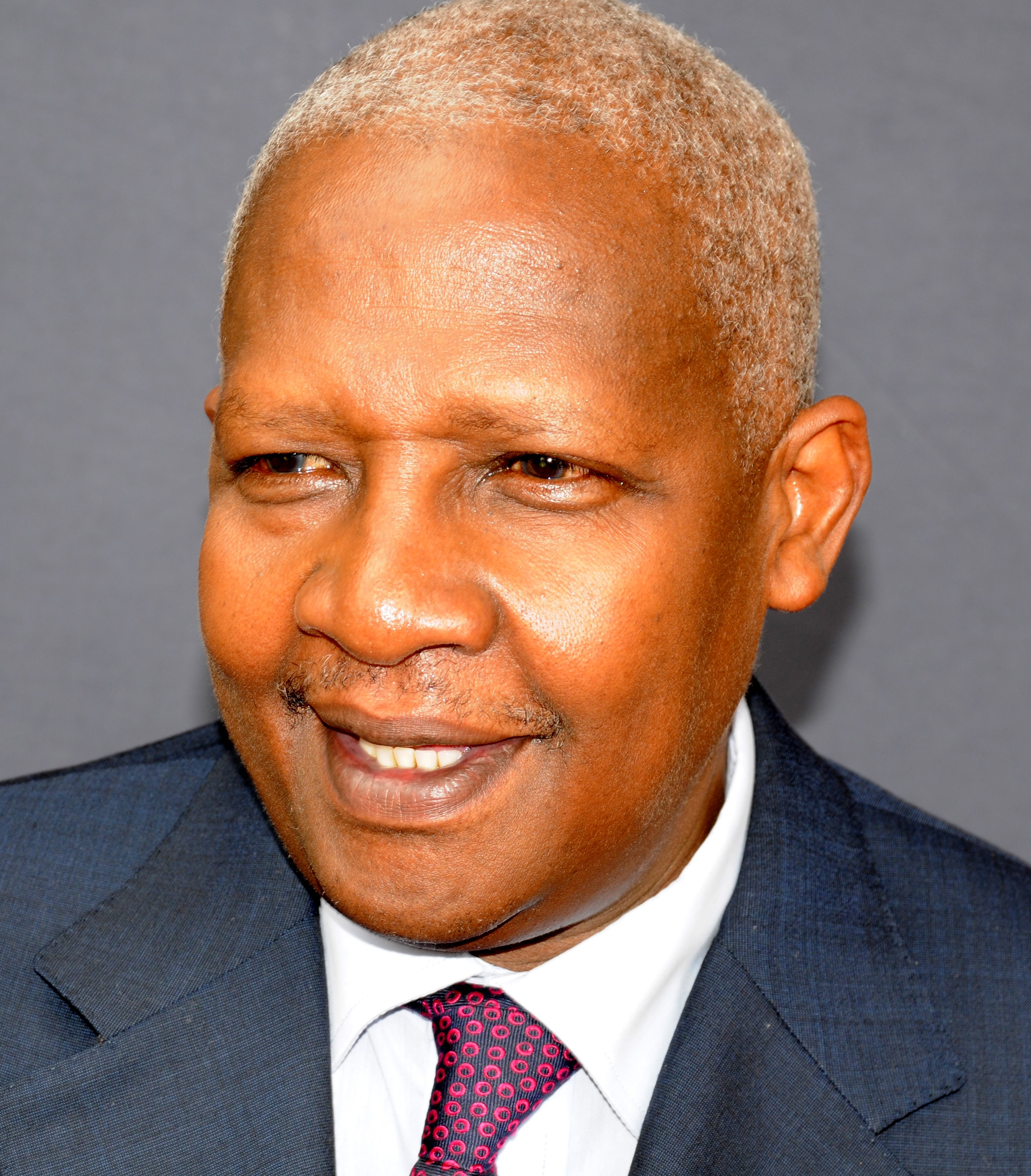
- Kutesa in 2018

Minister of Foreign Affairs
- In office 19 November 2015 – 3 May 2021
- Preceded by: Henry Oryem Okello
- Succeeded by: Jeje Odongo
- In office 13 January 2005 – 16 September 2014
- Preceded by: Tom Butime (acting)
- Succeeded by: Henry Oryem Okello (acting)

President of the United Nations General Assembly
- In office 16 September 2014 – 16 September 2015
- Preceded by: John William Ashe
- Succeeded by: Mogens Lykketoft

Personal details
- Born: 1 February 1949 (age 77) Uganda
- Spouse(s): Jeniffer Nankunda (Deceased), Edith Gasana Kutesa (m. 2008)
- Children: Charlotte Kutesa Muhoozi; Shartsi Kutesa Musherure; Isaac Kutesa; Ishta Asiimwe Kutesa
- Education: Makerere University (Bachelor of Laws); Law Development Centre (Postgraduate Diploma in Legal Practice)
- Occupation: Lawyer, politician
- Known for: Politics

Sam Kahamba Kutesa (born 1 February 1949) is a Ugandan politician, businessman, and lawyer By the marriage of his daughter Charlotte Kutesa Muhoozi with Muhoozi he became part of the inner circle of president Museveni.

Kutesa was the Minister of Foreign Affairs in the Cabinet of Uganda, a position he held from 13 January 2005 and maintained through three cabinet reshuffles until May 2021.

He was also the elected Member of Parliament (MP) for Mawogola County in Sembabule District. He was the President of the United Nations General Assembly during its 69th session in 2014–2015.

== Early life and education ==
Kutesa attended Mbarara High School. He has a Bachelor of Laws degree from Makerere University, back when the institution was part of the University of East Africa. He also has a Postgraduate Diploma in Legal Practice from the Law Development Centre in Kampala. He is an Anglican and member of the Church of Uganda.

== Career ==
Kutesa was in private law practice between 1973 and 2001. He served as Member of Parliament (MP) for Mbarara North Constituency from 1980 to 1985 and as Attorney General from 1985 to 1986. Between 1994 and 1995, he served as a delegate to the Constituent Assembly that drafted the 1995 Ugandan Constitution. He was elected MP for Mawogola County in 2001 and was re-elected in 2006. He was Minister of State for Investment from 2001 to 2005. President Yoweri Museveni appointed Sam Kutesa as Minister of Foreign Affairs in 2005, following the death of James Wapakhabulo.

He is a member of the ruling National Resistance Movement political party.

== Corruption ==
In 2011, Kutesa was accused in a parliamentary investigation of receiving bribes as kickbacks from Irish oil firm Tullow Oil. Despite calls from MPs for him to resign along with the others accused, a lawyer, Severino Twinobusingye, managed to successfully sue the Attorney General and halt the proceedings and to block the calls for resignation. Following further suspicion around the incident as a result of Tullow Oil's court case with Heritage Oil over its tax on Uganda assets, an ad-hoc parliamentary committee was convened to further investigate the allegations of corruption.

On 5 December 2018 a federal jury in New York City convicted Chi Ping Patrick Ho of paying bribes to top Ugandan officials Sam Kutesa and Yoweri Museveni. In May 2016, Ho and CEFC China executives traveled to Kampala. Before departing, Ho ensured that $500,000 was wired to the account provided by Kutesa. Ho also advised his boss, the Chairman of CEFC China, to provide $500,000 in cash to President Museveni, supposedly as a campaign donation, even though Museveni had already been reelected. Ho intended these payments as bribes to influence Kutesa and Museveni to use their official power to steer business advantages to CEFC China.

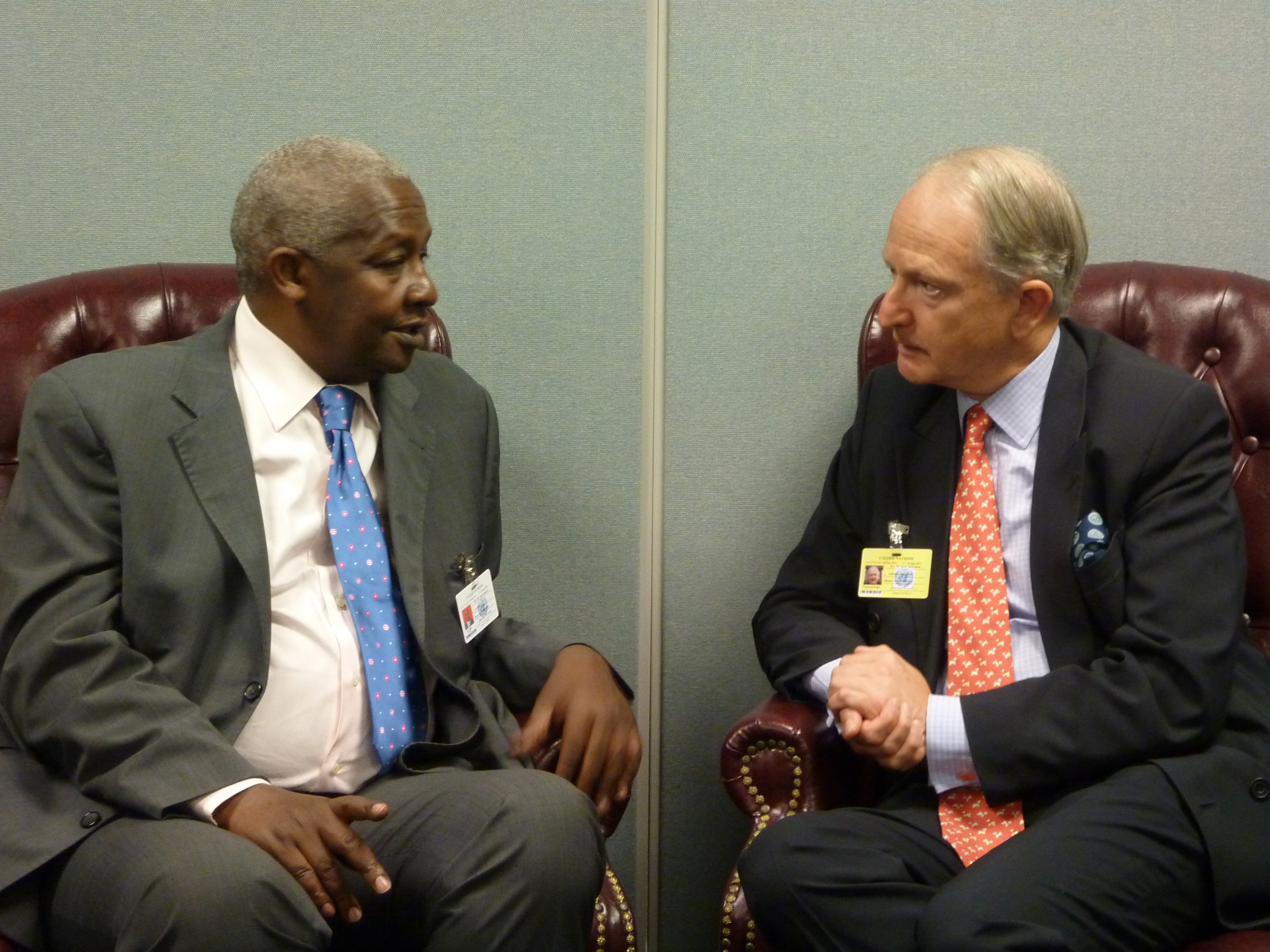
Minister for Africa Henry Bellingham met Ugandan Foreign Minister Sam Kutesa on 23 September in New York

== United Nations General Assembly ==
As Africa was due to hold the presidency of the sixty-ninth session of the United Nations General Assembly (UNGA), the African Union Executive Council unanimously chose him to be their candidate after the withdrawal of Cameroonian Foreign Minister Pierre Moukoko Mbonjo. His candidature was endorsed unanimously during the 17th Ministerial Meeting of the Non-Aligned Movement, held in Algiers, Algeria in May 2013. He was officially elected by the UNGA on 11 June 2014.

Because Kutesa defended the discriminatory Uganda Anti-Homosexuality Act, 2014, human rights organizations felt his U.N. presidential position was not supportive of the values embodied in the U.N.'s Universal Declaration of Human Rights. A petition asked United States Secretary of State John Kerry to revoke Kutesa's visa and thereby keep him from assuming the role of president of the UNGA. The petition – which garnered over 15,000 signatures on Change.org – was written by Ugandan Milton Allimadi, editor of Black Star News. He highlighted Kutesa's support of the Ugandan anti-gay bill and allegations of corruption. In spite of protests and the petition, Kutesa became the president.

== Other controversies ==
On April 27, 2025, social media was awash with pictures of an elegant church built by Kutesa in his home district of Sembabule. It had been built using over 3 billion Ugx (over 820,000 USD). At the opening ceremony of the church, Mr. Kutesa had revealed that he had built the church after surviving cancer of the throat, having spent 6 months under treatment in Germany in 2022. Many Ugandans, especially on social media sites like Twitter and Facebook, criticized the gesture as idiotic, emphasizing that he should have built a hospital instead, since he had to go abroad in the first place because the country has poor health services, and he should have been empathetic to poor Ugandans who cannot afford to fly to Germany in case they fall sick.

== Personal life ==
Sam Kutesa was previously married to Jennifer Nankunda Kutesa, who died in 2002 due to a cancer-related disease, she also was a cousin to Janet Museveni. Together they had 6 children who include;

- Isaac Kutesa (son) - married to Yvette Kamurasi
- Ishta Asiimwe Kutesa (daughter)
- Shatsi Musherure Kutesa (daughter)
- Charlotte Nankunda Kutesa (daughter) - married to Muhoozi Kainerugaba.
- Elizabeth Kutesa (daughter)
- Inga Kutesa (son)

Later in 2008, He Married Edith Gasana Kutesa on August 17, 2008.

== See also ==
- Foreign relations of Uganda

Political offices
Preceded by Henry Oryem Okello	Foreign Minister of Uganda; 19 November 2015 – present	Incumbent
Preceded by Tom Butime	Foreign Minister of Uganda; 13 January 2005 – 16 September 2014	Succeeded by Henry Oryem Okello
Positions in intergovernmental organisations
Preceded by John William Ashe	President of the United Nations General Assembly; 2014–2015	Succeeded by Mogens Lykketoft
