= Mawogola County =

- Location in Uganda
- Coordinates: 00°06′00″S 31°28′00″E
- Country: Uganda
- Region: Central Region
- District: Sembabule District
- Counties: Mawogola County
- Member of Parliament: Sam Kutesa

Mawogola County is a county in the Central Region of Uganda.

== Location ==
Mawogola County is west and south of Lwemiyaga County, and together they form Sembabule District. Among the sub-counties that constitute Mawogola County are (a) Lwebitakuli sub-county (b) Lugusulu sub-county (c) Mateete sub-county (d) Mijwala sub-county and (e) Sembabule Town Council.

== Overview ==
Mawogola County lies in the dry cattle corridor of Uganda. The major economic activity is farming of both crops and animals.

== See also ==
- Lwemiyaga County
