= Josina Machel =

Mozambican politician and activist

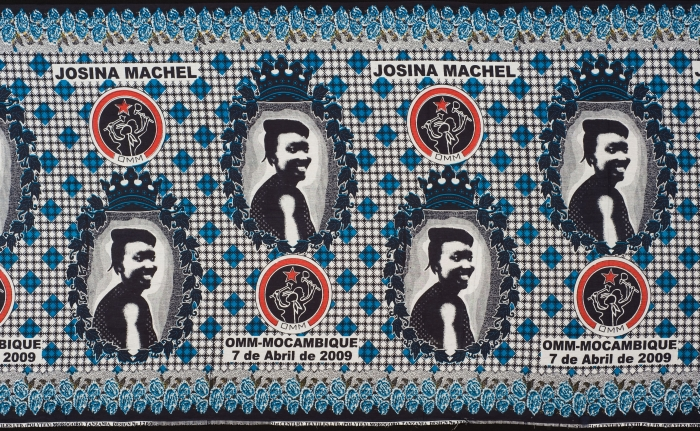
- Fabric art depicting Machel

Head of FRELIMO’s Department of Social Affairs

Head of the Women’s Section in FRELIMO’s Department of International Relations

Personal details
- Born: Josina Abiathar Muthemba; 10 August 1945 Vilanculos, Inhambane Province, Portuguese Mozambique
- Died: 7 April 1971 (aged 25) Dar-es-Salaam, Tanzania
- Spouse: Samora Machel (m. 1969)

Josina Abiathar Muthemba Machel (August 10, 1945 – April 7, 1971) was a leader of FRELIMO and a significant figure in the struggle for independence in Mozambique.

== Early years ==
Josina Machel was born with a twin brother, Belmiro, in Vilanculos, Inhambane, Mozambique on August 10, 1945, into an assimilado family that was nevertheless active in anti-colonial work. Her grandfather (a Presbyterian lay preacher who spoke out against Portuguese colonialism), her father, two of her sisters, and two uncles were all jailed at one point or another as a result of their participation in clandestine opposition to the Portuguese colonial administration. Her father worked as a nurse in government hospitals and this required him to periodically move the family to accommodate his job transfers. At the age of seven, Josina entered the primary school Dom João de Castro in Mocímboa da Praia, a school for the children of Portuguese and assimilado families. Two years later her father was transferred to the town of João Belo, and she enrolled in Mouzinho de Albuquerque. After 4th grade, she was sent to the capital city of Lourenço Marques in order to continue her education, living with her grandmother.

== Teenage years ==
In 1958, now 13 years old, Josina entered the commercial school Dr. Azevedo e Silva to pursue accounting. Two years later, she joined the Núcleo dos Estudantes Africanos Secundários de Mocambique (NESAM), a clandestine cultural and political organization that was founded by Eduardo Mondlane in 1949. Her political consciousness developed within the organization, which was surveilled by colonial police, until once she was 18 she fled the country with eight other students (including Armando Emilio Guebuza) intending the Tanzania-based Mozambican Liberation Front (FRELIMO). They managed to reach the Rhodesia-Zambia border at Victoria Falls, a journey of some 1,300 kilometres (800 mi), before they were apprehended, extradited back to Mozamqique, and jailed. Five months later, in the month of her 19th birthday, Josina was released from jail as a result of an international campaign carried out by FRELIMO. She resumed attending secondary school, but she was watched by police agents.

Four months afterwards, Josina fled Mozambique for a second time, again with a group of fellow students. From this point, she never saw any member of her family again. The group sought asylum in Swaziland, where they were put in a refugee camp. With the help of a local Presbyterian pastor, also a FRELIMO sympathizer, Josina and three others were able to escape from the camp just as it is rumored that they were to be turned over to the Portuguese authorities. Traveling first by car, then by foot, and finally by bus, the four students arrived in Johannesburg, South Africa. There, they made contact with a FRELIMO version of the American Underground Railroad. Next, the group travelled by truck to Francistown, Botswana, where they joined 14 others who were also seeking to get to Tanzania. Here they were declared "undesirable visitors" by the British colonial authorities and arrangements were made to deport them all to Swaziland. Following intense international publicity involving the Organization of African Unity and the United Nations, FRELIMO leader Eduardo Mondlane succeeded in persuading the British authorities to release the 18 students and allow them to proceed to Tanzania. The group was accordingly handed over to the United Nations High Commission for Refugees, which arranged for them to travel to Lusaka, Zambia. They spent several days in a refugee camp there, until they were turned over to a FRELIMO representative. After a long, arduous trip in public buses, the group finally arrived weak and undernourished in Dar es Salaam, Tanzania. All together, Josina had travelled nearly 3,200 km (2,000 mi) from her home.

== In the liberation struggle ==
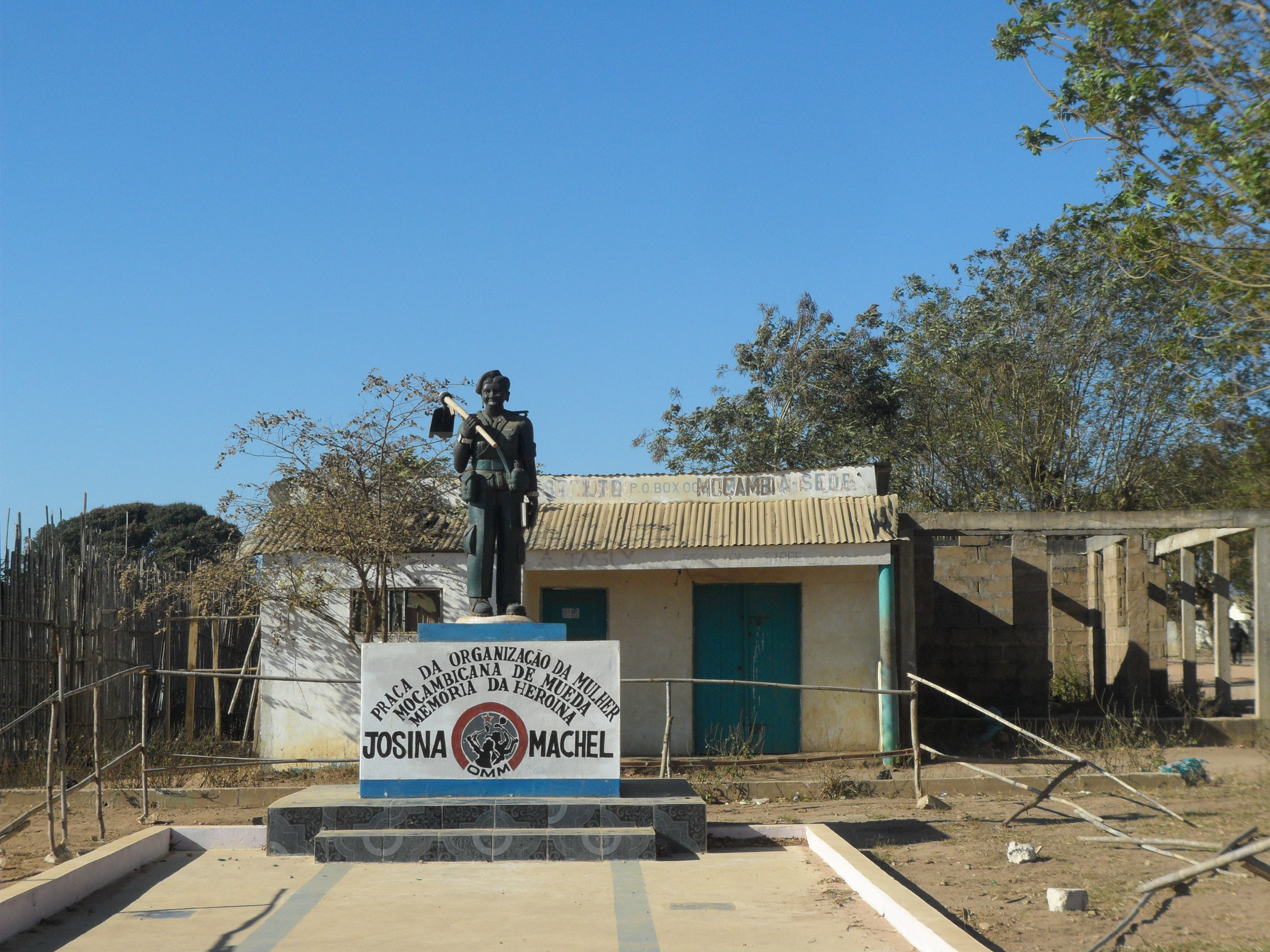
Josina Machel statue in Mueda, Cabo Delgado.

As she reached her 20th birthday, Josina was immediately assigned responsibilities within FRELIMO's multifaceted quest for national independence. She began work at the Mozambique Institute, a residential education center for Mozambican students in Tanzania, as assistant to the director. The director is Janet Mondlane, the American-born wife of FRELIMO president Eduardo Mondlane. A year and a half later, Josina turned down the offer of a scholarship to undertake university studies in Switzerland, and volunteered for FRELIMO's newly created Women's Branch (Destacamento Feminino). The Women's Branch was tasked with providing women with political and military training in order that they might be fully integrated into the liberation struggle. This initiative is little short of extraordinary as gender equality goes strongly against traditional African cultural norms.

Josina subsequently became one of 25 young women to go through three months of military training at Nachingwea in southern Tanzania where Mozambique liberation fighters received their military training for Mozambique guerrilla war. Samora Machel, the future first president of Mozambique and her future husband, served as the director of this training center.

Afterwards, Josina and other women combatants combined defensive roles in guarding supplies and facilities behind the lines of combat with community organizing roles in which they explained FRELIMO's history, goals, and purposes to the local liberated populations in the effort to win their moral and material support. This division of labor freed up additional men for direct military actions.

During 1968, the Women's Branch evolved into a de facto social services program for FRELIMO in the liberated areas. It organized health centers, schools, and child care centers. It helped families whose homes had been destroyed, and provided emotional support to wounded soldiers and peasant families traumatized by the warfare. Josina played a visionary role in identifying the need for child-care centers to look after children who had been orphaned or separated from their families by the war.

In mid-1968, Josina was named a delegate to the Second FRELIMO Congress, where she was a strong advocate for the full inclusion of women within all aspects of the liberation struggle. She was then appointed head of the Women's Section in FRELIMO's Department of International Relations. In this position she travelled periodically to international meetings on women's rights and the role of women in development where she uses examples of FRELIMO experiences to advocate for women's equal participation in all aspects of the development process. She was then 24 years old.

1969 proved an eventful year for Josina. She was appointed head of FRELIMO's Department of Social Affairs where she actively develops child care and educational centers in northern Mozambique and advocates with local populations for the importance of sending girls to school. When FRELIMO President Eduardo Mondlane is assassinated in Tanzania by Portuguese agents, Josina moves in with his wife, Janet, to provide comfort and company. In May she marries Samora Machel at the Educational Center of Tunduru in southern Tanzania, a facility she had helped to develop. At the end of November, Josina and Samora's only child, named Samora Junior and called Samito, is born.

During 1970 Josina began to suffer from stomach pains and weakness. She travelled to Moscow for medical attention. The apparent diagnosis was liver cancer. Rest and a strict diet were recommended, but Josina returned to her duties with FRELIMO. At the end of the year, she left Samito with a friend and undertook a two-month trip, largely on foot, through Niassa Province to assess conditions and plan activities for the Department of Social Affairs.

In March 1971 Josina travelled again, this time to Cabo Delgado, to evaluate social programs being implemented there. During the marches she struggled with chronic fatigue and exhaustion. Yet, at one point, she led a meeting of more than 1,000 persons. Tired and very thin, she decided to return to Dar es Salaam at the beginning of April. As she crossed the border into Tanzania, she handed her pistol to a companion and said: "Comrades, I can continue no longer. Give this to the military commander of the province so that it may contribute to the salvation of the Mozambican people."

In Dar es Salaam, Josina became seriously ill on April 5. She was taken to Muhimbili Hospital and died on April 7, 1971, at the age of 25. She was buried in Kinondoni Cemetery, where her uncle Mateus Muthemba, who was assassinated by Portuguese agents in 1968, is also interred.

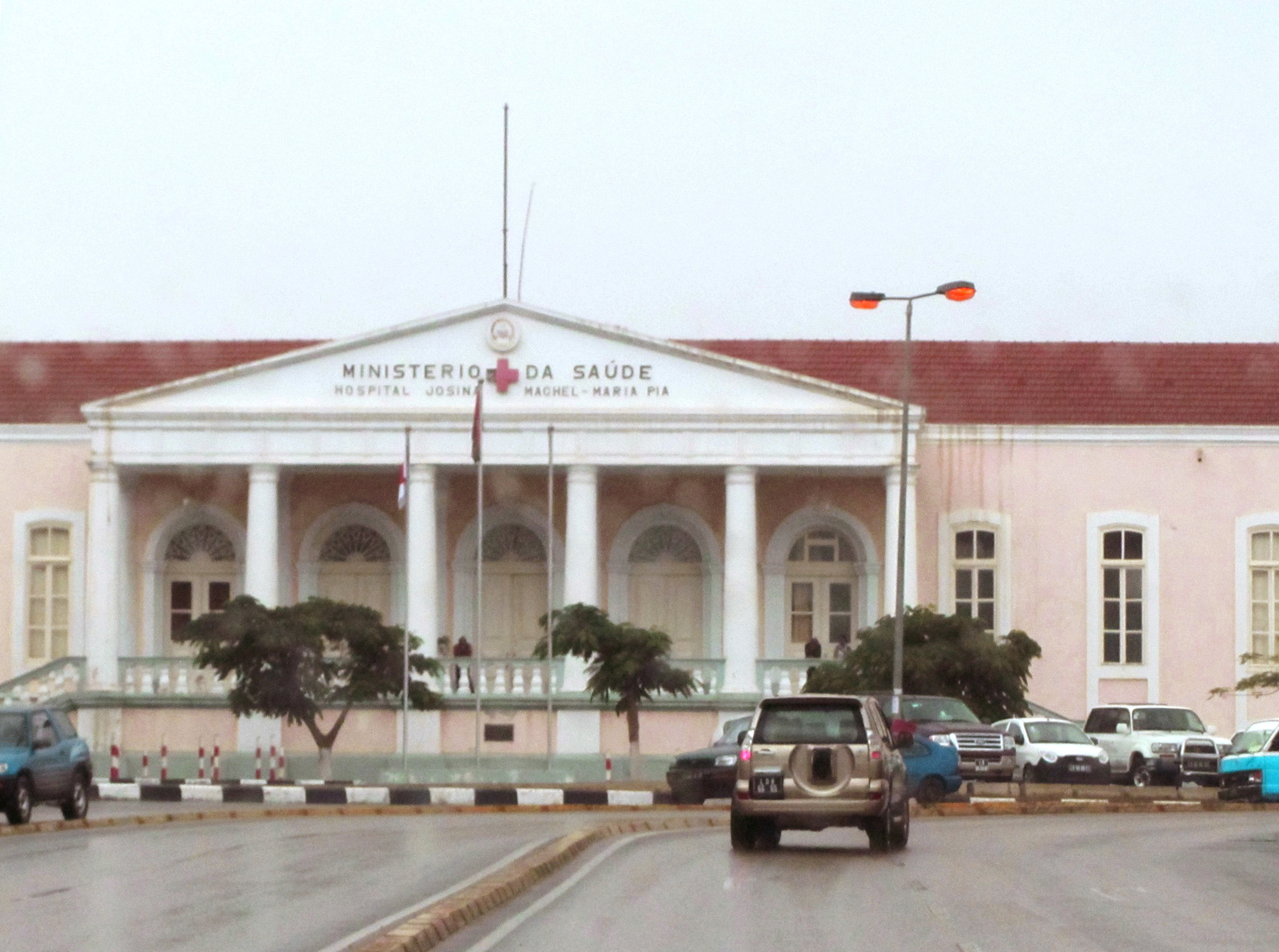
The Josina Machel Hospital named in her honour in Luanda, Angola.

A year later, FRELIMO declared April 7, the day of Josina's death, as National Women's Day in Mozambique. In March 1973, FRELIMO established the National Organization of Mozambican Women as the movement's social and political arm for women. Inspired in part by the ideals of women's emancipation that Machel had promoted, the organization continued to work for this goal following Mozambican independence in 1975. A number of Josina's sisters-in-arms went on to play important leadership roles in this organization and in government. The principal secondary school in the capital city is named after her.
