= Lwemiyaga County =

- Location in Uganda
- Coordinates: 00°08′00″N 31°10′00″E
- Country: Uganda
- Region: Central Region
- District: Sembabule District
- Counties: Lwemiyaga County
- Member of Parliament: Theodore Ssekikubo

Lwemiyaga County is a county in the Central Region of Uganda.

== Location ==
Lwemiyaga County is north-west of Mawogola County, and together they form Sembabule District. The county consists of two sub-counties: (a) Lwemiyaga sub-county and (b) Ntuusi sub-county. Urban centers in the county include Lwemiyaga and Ntuusi, located about 21 kilometres (13 mi) apart.

== Overview ==
Lwemiyaga County is in the dry cattle corridor of Uganda. Drought is one of the challenges that the county faces, along with bad roads and electricity shortages. Major economic activity is farming of both crops and animals.

== See also ==
- Mawogola County
- Lwemiyaga
- Ntuusi
