= Kinondoni Cemetery =

Historic cemetery in Dar es Salaam Region, Tanzania

Kinondoni Municipal Cemetery
- Makaburi ya Manispaa ya Kinondoni (Swahili)
- Interactive map of Kinondoni Municipal Cemetery

Details
- Established: 1938
- Location: Hananasif, Kinondoni MC, Dar es Salaam Region
- Country: Tanzania
- Coordinates: 6°47′42″S 39°16′8.4″E

Kionondoni Municipal Cemetery (Makaburi ya Manispaa ya Kinondoni, in Swahili) is a historic civil cemetery located in Hananasif ward of Kinondoni District in the Dar es Salaam Region of Tanzania. Ten Commonwealth soldiers from the Second World War are buried in this civil cemetery. The commission is also in charge of the cemetery's four non-war graves and one Belgian war grave.

== Overview ==
There are two sections of the cemetery: Kinondoni FM and Kinondoni Mwembejiji. Within them are subsections of Kionondoni I and II. Famous people like Herman Lupogo, Steve Kabyumba, and Josina Machel, Ephraim Kibonde are buried at the cemetery.

== History ==
A German former colonizer founded the cemetery in 1938, and the British Administration later changed the name to New European Cemetery. In the 1960s, the cemetery was regarded as an upper-class burial ground, but today, people from all social groups are interred there. It is still regarded as the city's most expensive cemetery. Anglicans, Protestants, Catholics, and Bahaiis are buried in the cemetery's eastern section, while Muslims and Christians are buried in Kinondoni Cemetery II in the cemetery's western section.

== Congestion and controversy ==
Investigations by Anadolu Agency in Dar es Salaam showed that burial activities continue unabated at graveyards that are overcrowded, like the Kinondoni and Temeke cemeteries. Investigations have revealed that shady gravediggers and site managers are charging grieving families exorbitant prices for tombs at these locations. According to the inquiry, dishonest grave diggers frequently search for old or unmarked graves to sell space to families in need of new graves. The popular Kindondoni cemetery is at capacity, with the exception of very wealthy families who have secured space, according to the investigation.
