= List of ecoregions in Uganda =

The following is a list of ecoregions in Uganda, as identified by the Worldwide Fund for Nature (WWF).

== Terrestrial ecoregions ==
by major habitat type

=== Tropical and subtropical moist broadleaf forests ===
- East African montane forests
- Albertine Rift montane forests

=== Tropical and subtropical grasslands, savannas, and shrublands ===
- East Sudanian savanna
- Northern Acacia–Commiphora bushlands and thickets
- Northern Congolian forest–savanna mosaic
- Victoria Basin forest–savanna mosaic

=== Flooded grasslands and savannas ===
- East African halophytics
- Zambezian flooded grasslands

=== Montane grasslands and shrublands ===
- East African montane moorlands
- Rwenzori–Virunga montane moorlands

== Freshwater ecoregions ==
by bioregion

=== Nilo-Sudan ===
- Upper Nile

=== Great Lakes ===
- Lakes Kivu, Edward, George, and Victoria
