= Sub-counties of Uganda =

Fourth level of division of Uganda

A sub-county is a local subdivision in Uganda. The country is divided into regions, then sub-regions, then districts, then counties, then sub-counties. The sub-counties are further divided into parishes and villages. Each sub-county has a council, with a mandated minimum of 30% of seats held by women.

The head elected official in a district is the Chairperson of the Local Council V.

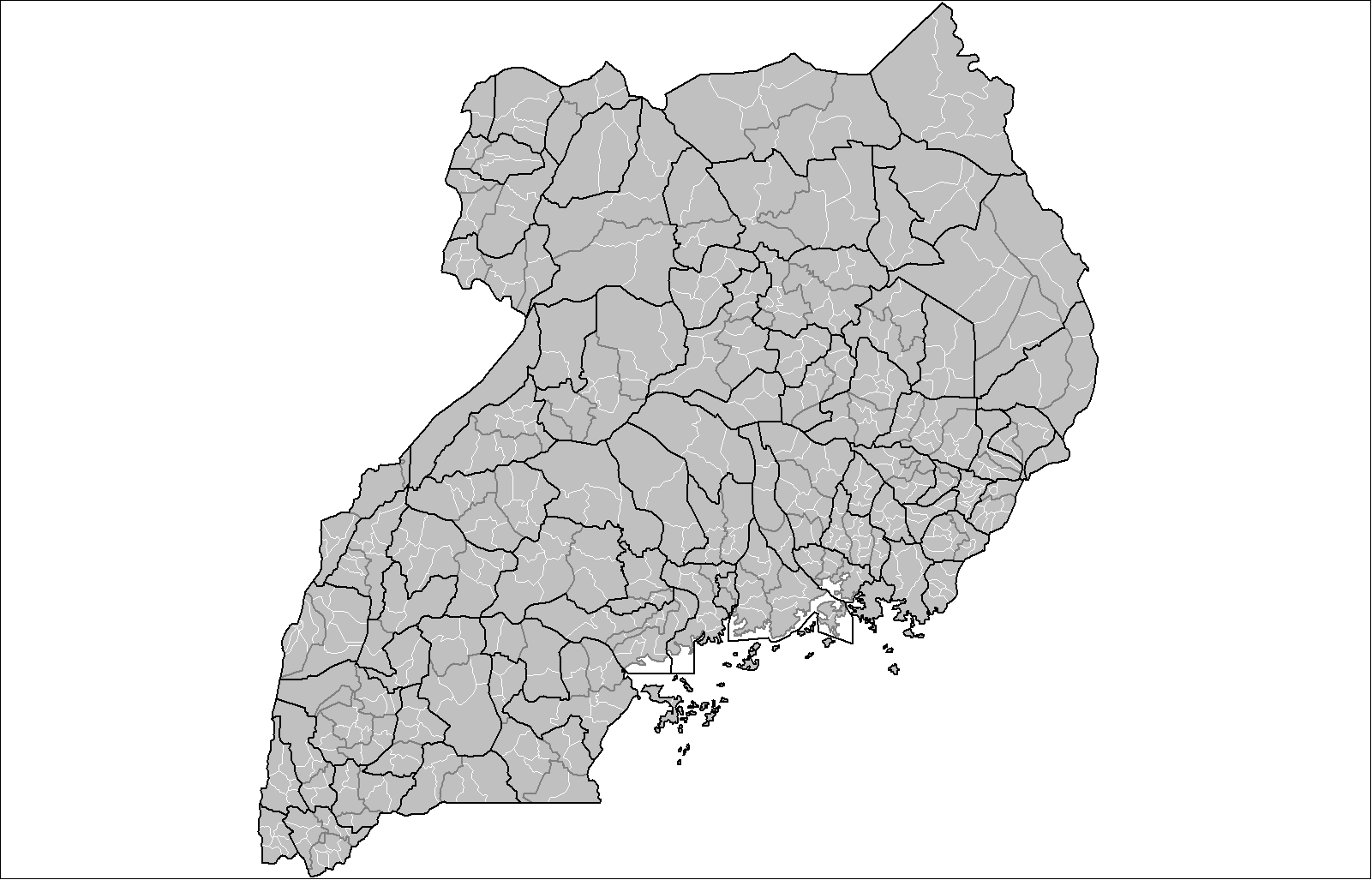
Sub-counties of Uganda

== See also ==
- Regions of Uganda
- Districts of Uganda
- Counties of Uganda
- Parishes of Uganda
- Uganda Local Governments Association
