= National AIDS Commission of Indonesia =

- Komisi Penanggulangan AIDS Nasional

Agency overview
- Formed: 1994
- Dissolved: 2016
- Agency executive: Kemal N. Siregar, Secretary (2016, before dissolution)
- Parent department: General Directorate of Disease Prevention and Control, Ministry of Health

The National AIDS Commission of Indonesia (Indonesian: Komisi Penanggulangan AIDS or Komisi Penanggulangan AIDS Nasional, KPAN) was an independent Indonesian non-structural government agency which was responsible for the prevention and management of AIDS issues in Indonesia. The commission was abolished in 2016, with its functions transferred to the General Director of Disease Prevention and Control of the Ministry of Health.

== History ==
The first case of HIV/AIDS in Indonesia was identified in Bali in 1987. In the same year, the United Nations General Assembly agreed on the urgency of a global strategy to combat AIDS. The Indonesian government then created a special committee for the management of AIDS and conducted an assessment of the HIV positive population through several decrees in 1988 and 1989. KPAN was first formed by Presidential Order 36/1994 as the AIDS Management Commission (Komisi Penanggulangan AIDS, KPA). In 2006, KPA was reformed into the National AIDS Commission of Indonesia by Presidential Order 75/2006 with the formation of its regional commissions.

== Programs ==
The government mandated KPAN, among others, to create and coordinate policies and activities related to the prevention, control, and management of AIDS in Indonesia, to inform and educate the public about AIDS and to conduct coordination with local and foreign agencies in the prevention and management of AIDS. KPAN was allowed to hire working groups and panel of experts to help its work. KPAN also partnered with local and international non-governmental organizations (NGO). It also supported academic research on HIV/AIDS and published periodical reports.

== Dissolution ==
The commission and its local chapters were dissolved by Presidential Order 124/2016 which also required KPAN to finish its mandate by the end of 2017. This decision was criticized by some who claimed that it was made without considering the opinion of the employees and partners of KPAN, with concerns that the management of HIV/AIDS in Indonesia would become more difficult without a designated governmental agency such as KPAN. The dissolution also meant that NGOs which had partnerships with KPAN now have to seek partnership directly with central or local government which may complicate their tasks in managing HIV/AIDS in Indonesia, particularly for the men who have sex with men population.

== See also ==
- HIV/AIDS in Indonesia
