= International rankings of Uganda =

These are the international rankings of Uganda

== International rankings ==
Organization	Survey	Ranking
Institute for Economics and Peace	Global Peace Index	103 out of 144
United Nations Development Programme	Human Development Index	157 out of 182
Transparency International	Corruption Perceptions Index	130 out of 180
World Economic Forum	Global Competitiveness Report	108 out of 133
World Intellectual Property Organization	Global Innovation Index, 2026	123 out of 139
