= Bukomansimbi District =

- District
- District location in Uganda
- Coordinates: 00°10′S 31°39′E
- Country: Uganda
- Region: Central Uganda
- Capital: Bukomansimbi

Area
  - Land: 600.2 km^{2} (231.7 sq mi)
- Elevation: 1,200 m (3,900 ft)

Population (2012 Estimate)
  - Total: 154,000
  - Density: 256.6/km^{2} (665/sq mi)
- Time zone: UTC+3 (EAT)

Bukomansimbi District is a district in Central Uganda. The district is named after its main municipal center, Bukomansimbi, the location of the district headquarters.

== Location ==
Bukomansimbi District is bordered by Gomba District to the north, Kalungu District to the east, Masaka District to the southeast, Lwengo District to the southwest and Sembabule District to the northwest. Bukomansimbi, where the district headquarters are located, lies approximately 26 kilometres (16 mi), by road, northwest of Masaka, the nearest large city. This location is approximately 150 kilometres (93 mi), by road, southwest of Kampala, Uganda's capital and largest city. The coordinates of Bukomansimbi District are: 00 10S, 31 39E.

== Overview ==
The district was created by an Act of parliament in 2010. It became functional on 1 July 2010, with its headquarters located at Bukomansimbi Town. It was formerly part of Masaka District, before it was split off as a separate independent district and also in Buddu county

== Population ==
In 1991, the national population census estimated the population at about 126,550. Eleven years later, the 2002 census put the population at approximately 139,560. In 2012, the mid-year district population was estimated at 154,000.

== See also ==
- Bukomansimbi Town
- Districts of Uganda
- Central Region, Uganda
