= Tanzania Commission for AIDS =

The Tanzania Commission for AIDS (TACAIDS) is the Tanzanian government organization assigned with the task of coordinating Tanzania's response to the HIV/AIDS epidemic.

TACAIDS was established on 1 December 2000 in an announcement by President Benjamin Mkapa.

Reginald Mengi is a former commissioner of TACAIDS.

== See also ==
- National AIDS Control Programme
