= Counties of Uganda =

Third level of division of Uganda

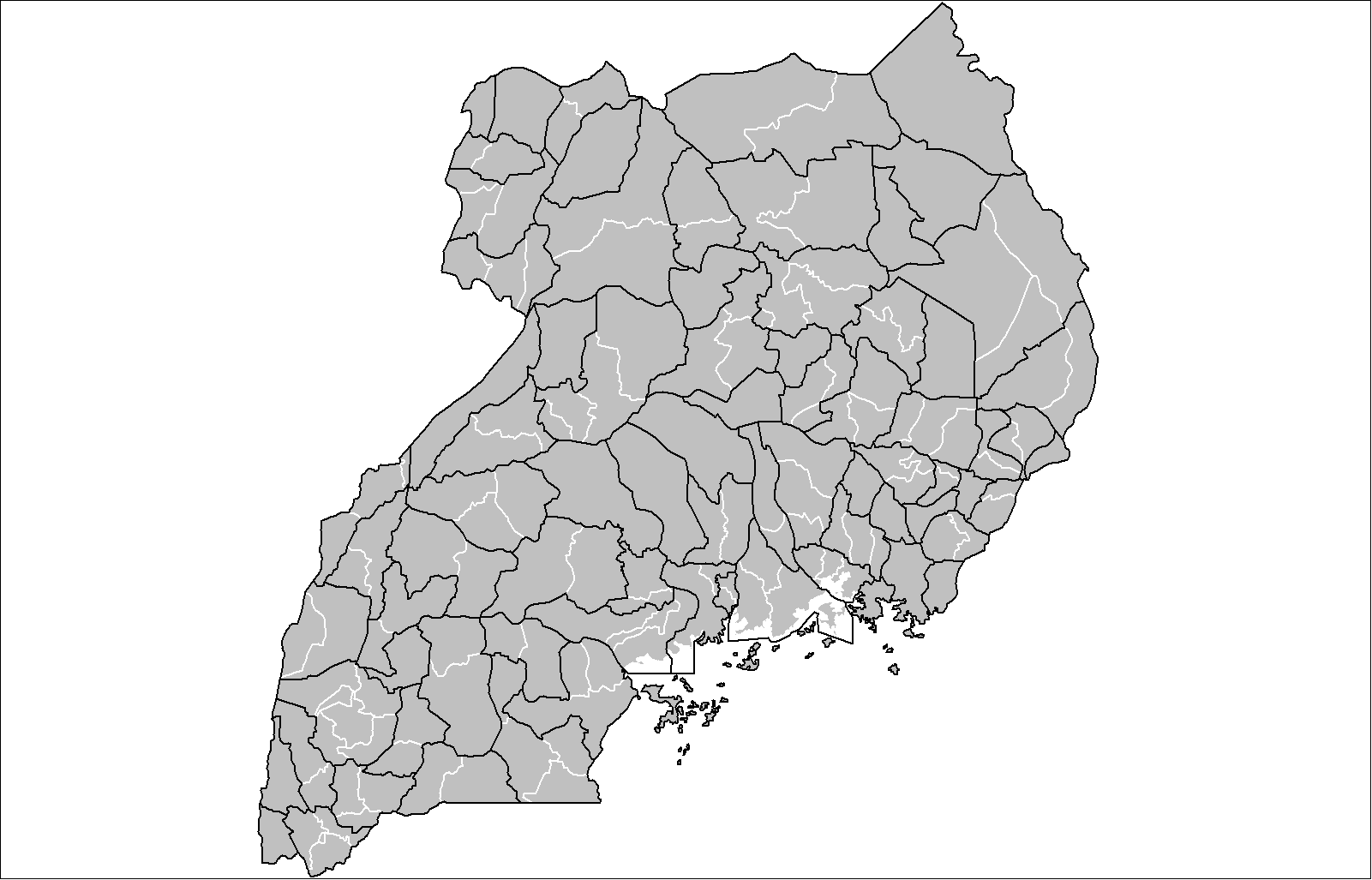
Counties of Uganda

The districts of Uganda are divided into 167 counties, 1 city council, and 23 municipal councils. Counties are divided into sub-counties. The counties are listed below, by district:

== List ==
County	District
Labwor County	Abim District
East Moyo County	Adjumani District
Agago County	Agago District
Ajuri County	Alebtong District
Moroto County	Alebtong District
Kioga County	Amolatar District
Upe County	Amudat District
Amuria County	Amuria District
Kapelebyong County	Amuria District
Kilak County	Amuru District
Kwania County	Apac District
Maruzi County	Apac District
Arua Municipal Council	Arua District
Ayivu County	Arua District
Madi-Okollo County	Arua District
Terego County	Arua District
Vurra County	Arua District
Budaka County	Budaka District
Iki-Iki County	Budaka District
Manjiya County	Bududa District
Bukooli County	Bugiri District
Buhweju County	Buhweju District
Buikwe County	Buikwe District
Bukedea County	Bukedea District
Bukomansimbi County	Bukomansimbi District
Kongasis County	Bukwo District
Bulambuli County	Bulambuli District
Buliisa County	Buliisa District
Bughendera County	Bundibugyo District
Bwamba County	Bundibugyo District
Bushenyi-Ishaka Municipal Council	Bushenyi District
Igara County	Bushenyi District
Busia Municipal Council	Busia District
Samia-Bugwe County	Busia District
Bunyole County	Butaleja District
Butambala County	Butambala District
Buvuma Islands County	Buvuma District
Budiope East County	Buyende District
Budiope West County	Buyende District
Dokolo County	Dokolo District
Gomba County	Gomba District
Aswa County	Gulu District
Gulu Municipal Council	Gulu District
Omoro County	Gulu District
Bugahya County	Hoima District
Buhaguzi County	Hoima District
Hoima Municipal Council	Hoima District
Ibanda County	Ibanda District
Bugweri County	Iganga District
Iganga Municipal Council	Iganga District
Kigulu County	Iganga District
Bukanga County	Isingiro District
Isingiro County	Isingiro District
Butembe County	Jinja District
Jinja Municipal Council	Jinja District
Kagoma County	Jinja District
Dodoth East County	Kaabong District
Dodoth West County	Kaabong District
Kabale Municipal Council	Kabale District
Ndorwa County	Kabale District
Rubanda County	Kabale District
Rukiga County	Kabale District
Bunyangabu County	Kabarole District
Burahya County	Kabarole District
Fort Portal Municipal Council	Kabarole District
Nakasongola County	Kabarole District
Kaberamaido County	Kaberamaido District
Kalaki County	Kaberamaido District
Bujumba County	Kalangala District
Kyamuswa County	Kalangala District
Bulamogi County	Kaliro District
Kalungu County	Kalungu District
Kampala Capital City	Kampala District
Bugabula County	Kamuli District
Buzaaya County	Kamuli District
Kibale County	Kamwenge District
Kitagwenda County	Kamwenge District
Kinkiizi County	Kanungu District
Tingey County	Kapchorwa District
Bukonzo County	Kasese District
Busongora County	Kasese District
Kasese Municipal Council	Kasese District
Toroma County	Katakwi District
Usuk County	Katakwi District
Bbaale County	Kayunga District
Ntenjeru County	Kayunga District
Bugangaizi County	Kibaale District
Bugangaizi East County	Kibaale District
Buyaga County	Kibaale District
Buyaga West County	Kibaale District
Buyanja County	Kibaale District
Kiboga East County	Kiboga District
Kibuku County	Kibuku District
Kazo County	Kiruhura District
Nyabushozi County	Kiruhura District
Kibanda County	Kiryandongo District
Bufumbira County Easts	Kisoro District
Bufumbira County North	Kisoro District
Bufumbira County South	Kisoro District
Chua County	Kitgum District
Koboko County	Koboko District
Kole County	Kole District
Jie County	Kotido District
Kumi County	Kumi District
Kween County	Kween District
Kiboga West County	Kyankwanzi District
Kyaka County	Kyegegwa District
Mwenge County	Kyenjojo District
Lamwo County	Lamwo District
Erute County	Lira District
Lira Municipal Council	Lira District
Luuka County	Luuka District
Bamunanika County	Luweero District
Katikamu County	Luweero District
Bukoto County	Lwengo District
Kabula County	Lyantonde District
Bubulo County	Manafwa District
Maracha County	Maracha District
Bukoto Central County	Masaka District
Bukoto East County	Masaka District
Masaka Municipal Council	Masaka District
Bujenje County	Masindi District
Buruuli County	Masindi District
Masindi Municipal Council	Masindi District
Bunya County	Mayuge District
Bungokho County	Mbale District
Mbale Municipal Council	Mbale District
Kashari County	Mbarara District
Mbarara Municipal Council	Mbarara District
Rwampara County	Mbarara District
Ruhinda County	Mitooma District
Busujju County	Mityana District
Mityana County	Mityana District
Matheniko County	Moroto District
Moroto Municipal Council	Moroto District
Obongi County	Moyo District
West Moyo County	Moyo District
Mawokota County	Mpigi District
Buwekula County	Mubende District
Kasambya County	Mubende District
Kassanda County	Mubende District
Mukono County	Mukono District
Mukono Municipal Council	Mukono District
Ik County	Kaabong District
Nakifuma Council	Mukono District
Chekwii (Kadam) County	Nakapiripirit District
Pian County	Nakapiripirit District
Nakaseke North County	Nakaseke District
Nakaseke South County	Nakaseke District
Budyebo County	Nakasongola District
Nakasongola County	Nakasongola District
Bukooli Island County	Namayingo District
Bukooli South County	Namayingo District
Busiki County	Namutumba District
Bokora County	Napak District
Jonam County	Nebbi District
Padyere County	Nebbi District
Ngora County	Ngora District
Ntoroko County	Ntoroko District
Kajara County	Ntungamo District
Ntungamo Municipal Council	Ntungamo District
Ruhaama County	Ntungamo District
Rushenyi County	Ntungamo District
Nwoya County	Nwoya District
Otuke County	Otuke District
Oyam County	Oyam District
Aruu County	Pader District
Agule County	Pallisa District
Butebo County	Pallisa District
Pallisa County	Pallisa District
Kakuuto County	Rakai District
Kooki County	Rakai District
Kyotera County	Rakai District
Bunyaruguru County	Rubirizi District
Katerera County	Rubirizi District
Rubabo County	Rukungiri District
Rujumbura County	Rukungiri District
Rukungiri Municipal Council	Rukungiri District
Lwemiyaga County	Sembabule District
Mawogola County	Sembabule District
Kasilo County	Serere District
Serere County	Serere District
Sheema County	Sheema District
Budadiri County	Sironko District
Soroti County	Soroti District
Soroti Municipal Council	Soroti District
Tororo County	Tororo District
Tororo Municipal Council	Tororo District
West Budama County	Tororo District
Busiro County	Wakiso District
Entebbe Municipal Council	Wakiso District
Kyadondo County	Wakiso District
Aringa County	Yumbe District
Okoro County	Zombo District

== See also ==
- Regions of Uganda
- Districts of Uganda
- Sub-counties of Uganda
- Uganda Local Governments Association
