= Sembabule District =

- District
- District location in Uganda
- Coordinates: 00°06′S 31°30′E
- Country: Uganda
- Region: Buganda
- Established: 1997
- Capital: Sembabule

Area
  - Total: 2,470.5 km^{2} (953.9 sq mi)
  - Land: 2,318.4 km^{2} (895.1 sq mi)
  - Water: 152.1 km^{2} (58.7 sq mi)
- Elevation: 1,200 m (3,900 ft)

Population (2012 Estimate)
  - Total: 219,600
  - Density: 94.7/km^{2} (245/sq mi)
- Time zone: UTC+3 (EAT)
- Website: www.sembabule.go.ug

Sembabule District is a district in the Central Region of Uganda. The town of Sembabule is the site of the district headquarters. Other urban centers in the district include Lwemiyaga and Ntuusi.

== Location ==
Sembabule District is bordered by Mubende District to the north, Gomba District to the northeast, Bukomansimbi District to the east, Lwengo District to the south, Lyantonde District to the southwest, and Kiruhura District to the northwest. The town of Sembabule is approximately 48 kilometres (30 mi), by road, northwest of Masaka, the largest town in the sub-region.

== Overview ==
Sembabule District was carved out of Masaka District in 1997. The district is generally a rural district that receives relatively low rainfall and has long dry spells. This greatly affects agriculture, but cattle keeping is not seriously affected. Some cattle are reared on ranches. Ranching and dairy farming are the backbone of the district's economy.

Administratively, the district has two counties (Lwemiyaga and Mawogola Counties) that are divided into the following sub-counties:

- Mateete
- Rwebitakuri
- Mijwala
- Lugusulu
- Ntuusi
- Lwemiyaga
- Sembabule

== Population ==
In 1991, the national population census estimated the district population at 144,040. The 2002 national census estimated the population at 180,050, with an annual growth rate of 2 percent. In 2012, the population was estimated at 219,600.

== Economic activities ==
Agriculture is the mainstay of the district economy. Agriculture involves both crop and animal husbandry. Because of the relatively dry climate, cattle ranching for beef and dairy farming are the most important economic activities in the district. Fish farming is being implemented increasingly in the district as well. The produce of the district is marketed in Uganda's larger cities and in area towns including Kampala, Masaka, and Rakai. The crops grown for food and sale include:

1. Sweet bananas
2. Matooke
3. Potatoes
4. Cassava
5. Yams
6. Maize
7. Millet
8. Cabbage
9. Peas
10. Mangos
11. Pineapple
12. Groundnuts
13. Passion fruit

== Points of interest ==
In the region around Bwera, there is a site known as Bigo bya Mugenyi, which appears to be the location of human settlement dating back to the late Iron Age (1200 BC- 1000 BC). Excavations at the site have yielded iron blades (most probably used for harvesting grain), pottery with simple decorations, cattle dung, and post-holes for fencing.

== See also ==
- Districts of Uganda
