= Uganda Local Governments Association =

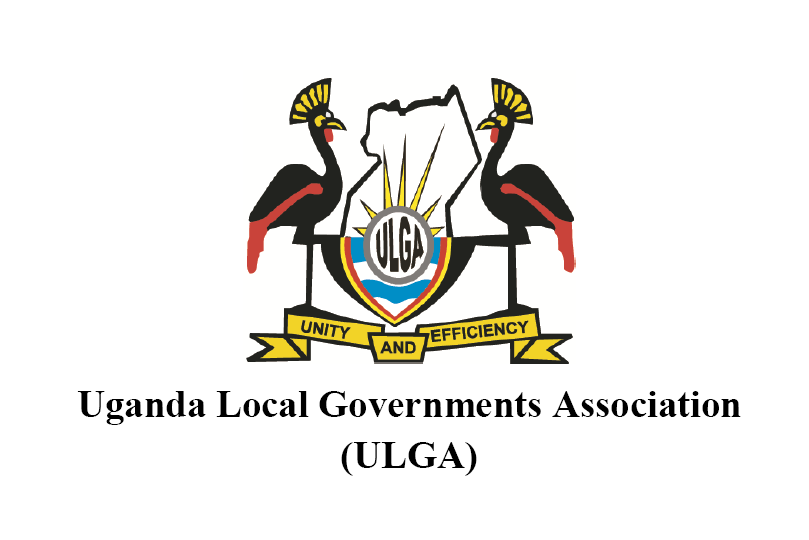

The Uganda Local Governments’ Association (ULGA) is the National Association of Local Governments of Uganda. It is a private, voluntary and non-profit body.

== History ==
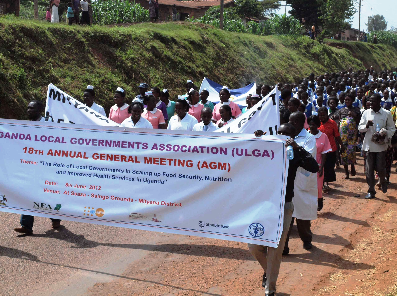
Community gathering at the ULGA Annual Meeting in June 2012 in Mityana District, Uganda.

ULGA was originally established as the Uganda Local Authorities Association (ULAA) in 1994, during a period when the Ugandan government had begun implementing the Decentralization Policy and was in the process of drafting the 1995 Constitution.

At the time, District Chairpersons—led by Hon. C.G. Kiwanuka-Musisi, then Chairperson of the greater Mukono District Council—came together to form ULAA on 14 April 1994 at the Uganda Management Institute in Kampala. Their aim was to create a stronger collective voice to lobby and advocate for their members and to address local government concerns within a broader national context. On 1 October 2004, during their Annual General Meeting in Mbarara, members agreed to change the association's name to Uganda Local Governments Association (ULGA), to better represent the interests of all local governments, including affiliate members.

== Legal status ==
ULGA is a registered legal entity, guided by its Constitution, and owned by its constituent local governments as members. It was established to represent and advocate for the constitutional rights and interests of local governments, and to serve as the negotiating agency on behalf of its members.

== Mandate ==
ULGA's mandate is to unite Local Governments and provide them with association member services, as well as a forum through which they can come together to offer mutual support and guidance, and develop common positions on key issues affecting local governance. ULGA fulfills this mandate through lobbying, advocacy, and the representation of Local Governments at local, national, and international fora.

Although ULGA is not an organ of government, its role is implied and recognized by the state through various arrangements. These include the appointment—by His Excellency the President—of members to the Local Government Finance Commission (LGFC); active participation in sector negotiations on conditional grants with sector ministries; involvement in the Decentralisation Policy Strategy Framework (DPSF) and the Local Government Sector Investment Plan (LGSIP); and representation of local governments and their interests in national fora such as the Northern Uganda Social Action Fund (NUSAF), the National Agricultural Research Organisation (NARO), the Public Sector Management Working Group (PSM-WG), the Decentralisation Management Technical Working Group (DMTWG), among others.

== Objectives ==
The objectives of ULGA as stipulated in its Strategic Corporate plan of 2010–2014, an instrument that guides ULGA's planning, budgeting and resource allocation are:

- To support a strong ULGA uniting and representing the interests of members and providing them with efficient and effective services
- Trusted Local Governments performing their mandated functions in an accountable and transparent manner
- To ensure a conducive policy, legal and regulatory framework for decentralisation and operation of LGs

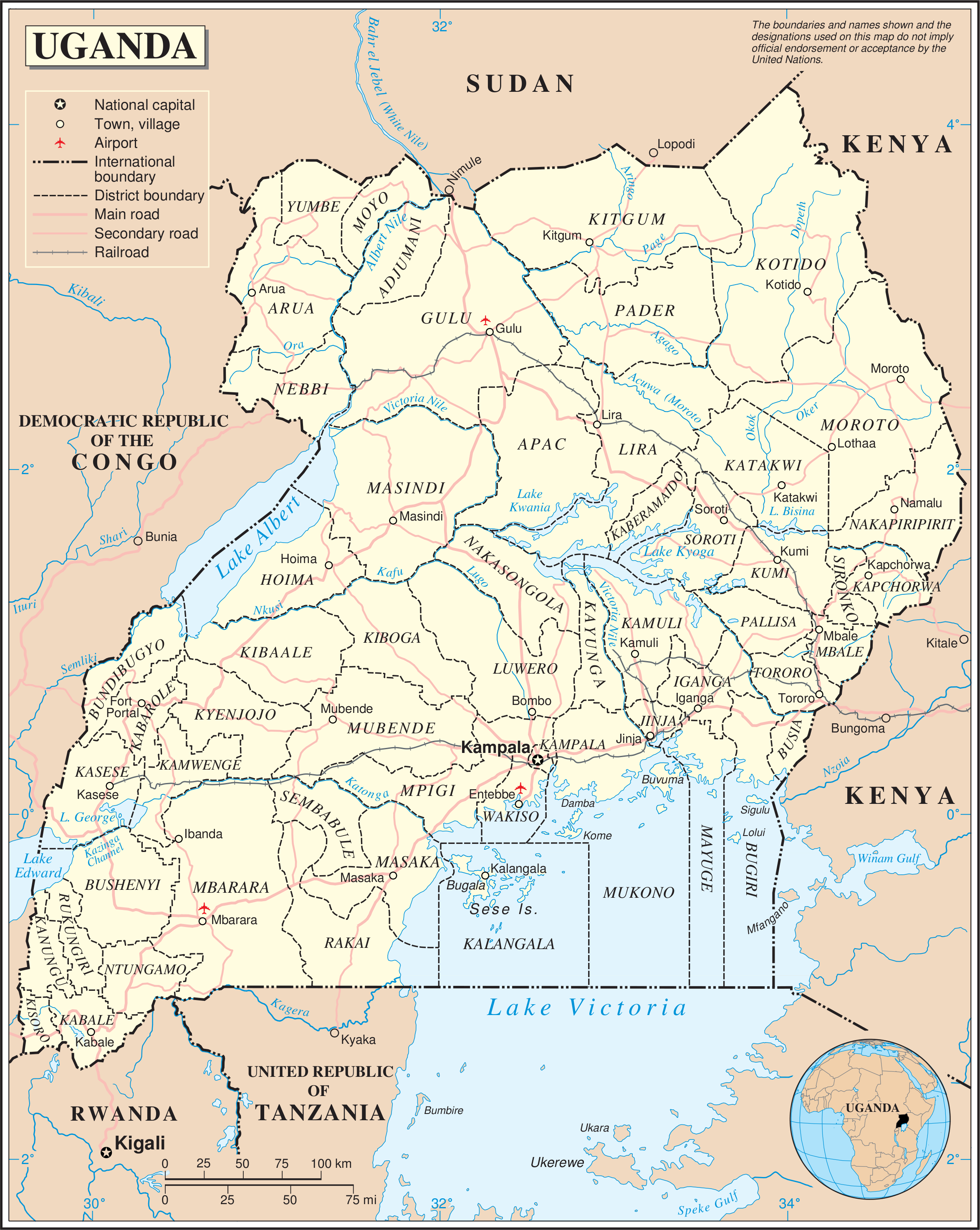
A map of the Republic of Uganda, showing its sub-national divisions.

== Membership ==
Every District and Lower Local Government Council is eligible to become a member of the Association upon passing a council resolution, adopting the constitution, and paying the membership and subscription fees.

There are two categories of members: District Councils as Higher Local Governments, and Municipalities, Sub-counties, and Town Councils as Lower Local Governments. Currently, all one hundred and eleven (111) districts and over eight hundred (800) Lower Local Governments are members of ULGA. Membership fees are paid once, while annual subscription fees vary depending on the district’s structural model, as established by the Ministry of Public Service.

The ULGA Constitution also recognizes affiliate organizations as part of its membership structure. Through the Secretariat, the Association coordinates and, where possible, co-finances the activities of these bodies. The current affiliate associations include the Association of District Speakers (UDICOSA), the Association of Chief Administrative Officers (ALGAOU), and the Association of Chief Finance Officers (CFOs). Secretariat staff are assigned to these different bodies to assist them in performing their functions.

== Structure and Management ==
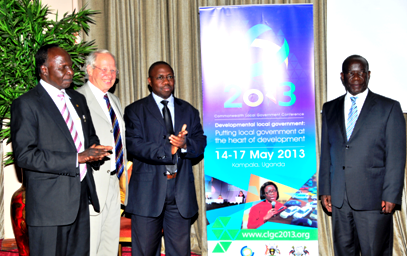
The launch of the Commonwealth Local Government Conference held in Uganda in May 2013, hosted by the Ugandan Ministry if Local Government in Partnership with ULGA. Left to Right: Peter Odok W’oceng - President of ULGA, Carl Wright – Secretary General Commonwealth Local Government Forum (CLGF), Hon. Adolf Mwesige – Minister of Local Government, and H.E. Edward Ssekandi Vice President of the Republic of Uganda.

The Association is able to meet its objectives through a number of organs. These include: the Annual General Meeting, the executive committee, the Ethics and Accountability Committee and the National Secretariat.

=== Annual General Meeting ===
This is the supreme policy organ of the Association, which convenes once every year. The Assembly is composed of local government representatives: all District Chairpersons, all District Speakers of Councils, all District Chief Administrative Officers, and representatives of Sub County Chairpersons. The AGM is preceded by regional meetings organized by the Regional Representatives. Special and extraordinary general meetings may also be convened as necessary, as clearly spelled out in the provisions of the ULGA Constitution. It is the responsibility of the respective District Local Governments to facilitate their representatives and ensure their full participation in these meetings. It is also the responsibility of the District Chairpersons and Chief Administrative Officers to assist Lower Local Governments in organizing and selecting one LCIII Chairperson to represent them at the AGM.

=== Standing Committees ===
The Ethics and Accountability Committee is appointed by the Annual General Meeting and serves a tenure of two and half years. The committee is mandated to oversee the implementation of the ULGA Charter on Accountability and the Ethical Code of Conduct

=== National Executive Committee ===
Every two (2) years, the AGM elects a National Executive Committee (NEC) that consists of 22 members. This organ gives directive and guidance to the Secretariat. They oversee implementation of the budget and policies established by the AGM and give the necessary political backup to staff for the various interactions with stakeholders and the government. The executive committee meets quarterly under the Chairmanship of the President at a suitable and affordable venue. Their mandate involves receiving quarterly activity status reports and financial performance briefs of the previous quarter from the Secretary General and approving the Work plan and expenditures of the new quarter. The committee consists of:

- A President
- A Vice-president
- 5 Regional District Chairpersons
- 5 Chief Administrative Officers to represent their respective Regions
- 5 District Speakers to represent their respective regions
- 5 Sub County Chairpersons to represent their respective regions

=== Regional Structure ===
ULGA has a Structure with 5 Regions from which the members of the executive committee are elected and these are: Northern Region, Eastern Region, Karamoja Region, Western Region and Central Region. Regional "offices" (not buildings) have been established in the Regions with the purpose of facilitating ULGA's Regional representation, flow of information from members to the headquarters and training. The Regional branches are headed by the Regional Chairperson who must be a District Chairperson. The Secretariat staff are attached to the Regions to provide technical and other necessary support.

=== Executive Sub-Committees ===
The representation of the members of the sub committees is from the executive committee members. Each Sub Committee is represented by One Chairperson (apart from the Public Relations and Finance Committee where President and Vice President are members respectively), One Speaker, One Chief Administrative Officer and One Sub county chairperson.

- Finance and Management Sub-Committee
- Training and Capacity Building Sub-Committee
- Human Rights, Peace and Conflict Resolution Sub-Committee
- HIV/AIDS, Gender, Disability and Environment Sub-Committee
- International and Public Relations Sub-Committee

=== ULGA Negotiation and Advocacy Team (UNAT) ===
ULGA has a Negotiation and Advocacy Team, which includes members outside the National Executive Committee. The Urban Councils and Lower Local Government Representatives in particular are part of the UNAT in order to enhance articulation of issues affecting all levels of Local Governments. The UNAT is primarily responsible for the Annual Negotiations on the Conditional Grants with Line Ministries but it may also be activated for other fields of advocacy and negotiation.

The members are

- President ULGA (chair)
- Chairperson UAAU (Co-chair)
- Vice President ULGA (Member)
- Vice-chairperson UAAU (Member)
- Chairperson of ULGA's Finance Committee (Member)
- Honorary Secretary UAAU (Member)
- Chairperson Speakers’ Association (Member)
- Chairperson CAO's Association (Member)
- Chairperson Town Clerks’ Association (Member)
- Representative of Town Councils (Member)
- Chairperson, Urban Divisions’ Association (Member)
- Representative of Sub-counties (Member)
- Chairperson of CFOs in Districts (Member)
- Chairperson of CFOs in Urban areas (Member)

== Secretariat ==
The Secretariat is the implementing arm of the Association, responsible for day-to-day management. It is headed by the Secretary General, who is assisted by Heads of Directorate, professional staff, senior and junior officers, and support staff—a total of 20 full-time employees. This team is occasionally supported by consultants, technical assistants, and student interns from various universities

== Financing ==
ULGA is primarily financed through members' contributions, as well as donations from well-wishers and development partners such as DANIDA, DFID, USAID, the EU, and VNG. Additionally, the Secretariat undertakes consultancy services to support its operations.
