= Sembabule =

- Map of Uganda showing the location of Sembabule.
- Coordinates: 00°04′48″S 31°27′36″E
- Country: Uganda
- Region: Central Region of Uganda
- District: Sembabule District
- Elevation: 1,180 m (3,870 ft)

Population (2020 Estimate)
  - Total: 7,800
- Time zone: UTC+3 (EAT)

Sembabule (sometimes spelled Ssembabule) is a town in Sembabule District in the Central Region of Uganda. The town is the main municipal, administrative, and commercial center of the district and the site of the district headquarters.

== Geography ==
Sembabule is about 100 kilometres (62 mi) south of Mubende, the nearest large town. It is approximately 51 kilometres (32 mi), by road, northwest of Masaka, the nearest large city. The town is approximately 176 kilometres (109 mi), by road, southwest of Kampala, the capital and largest city of Uganda. The coordinates of the town are 0°04'48.0"S, 31°27'36.0"E (Latitude:-0.0800; Longitude:31.4600).

== Population ==
The 2002 national census estimated the population of the town to be 4,010. In 2010, the Uganda Bureau of Statistics (UBOS) estimated the population at 4,700. In 2011, UBOS estimated the mid-year population at 4,800.

In 2015, the Uganda Bureau of Statistics estimated the mid-year population of Sembabule at 6,800 people. In 2020, the agency estimated the population of the town at 7,800. The UBOS calculated the average annual population growth rate between 2015 and 2020 at 2.78 percent.

== Points of interest ==
The following additional points of interest lie within town or near the town limits:

1. The offices of Sembabule Town Council

2. The offices of Sembabule District Administration

3. Sembabule Central Market

4. Bigo bya Mugenyi, a prehistoric human settlement, dating back to the Iron Age, circa (1200–1000 BC)

5. The 135 kilometres (84 mi) Mpigi–Kabulasoke–Maddu–Sembabule Road, ends in this town.

== See also ==
- List of cities and towns in Uganda
