= Regions of Uganda =

Subdivision of Uganda

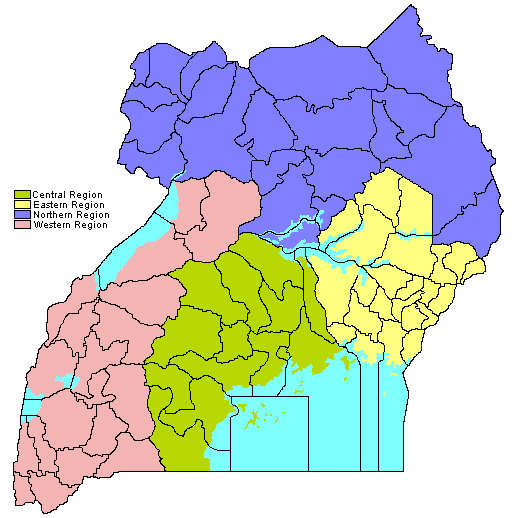
Regions of Uganda (with district borders as they were in 2006)

The regions of Uganda are known as Central, Western, Eastern, and Northern. These four regions are in turn divided into districts. There were 56 districts in 2002, which expanded into 111 districts plus one city (Kampala) by 2010.

The national government interacts directly with the districts, so regions do not have any definite role in administration. Under British rule before 1962, the regions were functional administrative units and were called provinces, headed by a Provincial Commissioner. The central region is the kingdom of Buganda, which then had a semi-autonomous government headed by the Kabaka (king). The equivalent of the Provincial Commissioner for Buganda was called the Resident.

At Uganda's 2002 census, the Central region (coterminous with the Kingdom of Buganda, one of the ancient African monarchies constitutionally recognised in Uganda) contained 27 percent of the country's population, the Western region contained 26 percent, the Eastern region 25 percent, and the Northern region 22 percent.

The country's population density by region was 226 persons per square kilometre (km^{2}) in the Eastern region, 176 per km^{2} in the Central region, 126 per km^{2} in the Western region, and 65 per km^{2} in the Northern region.

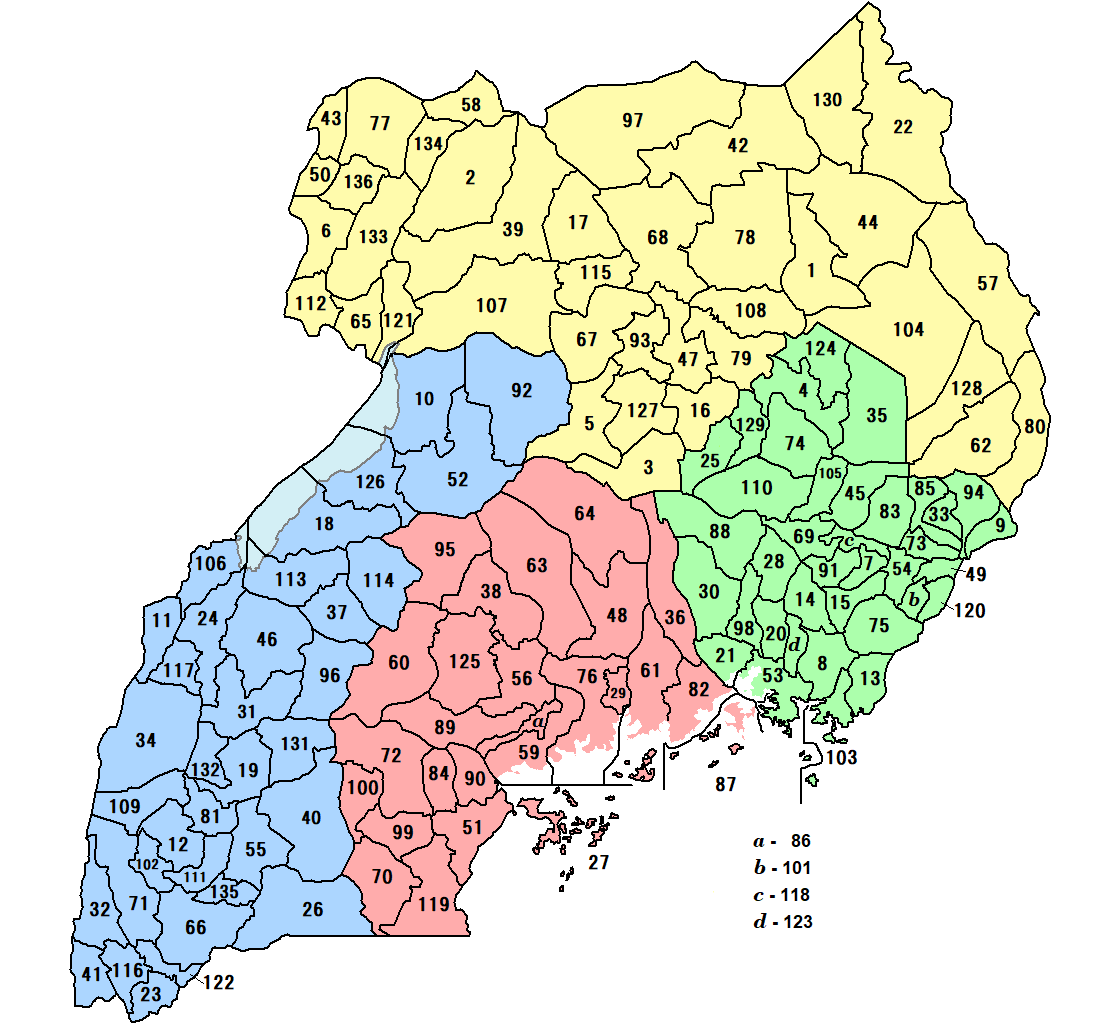
Regions of Uganda (with district borders as they were in 2020) Central Western Eastern Northern

In 2002, approximately 3 million people, or 12 percent of the country's population, lived in urban areas. The Central region had 54 percent of the urban population (mostly in the city of Kampala), the Northern region 17 percent, the Western region 14 percent, and the Eastern region 13 percent.

Population and area of regions in Uganda
Region	Population (Census)			Chief Town	Districts	Area	
Region	1991	2002	2014	Chief Town	Districts	km^{2}	mi^{2}
Central	4,843,594	6,575,425	9,529,227	Kampala	24	61,403.2	23,707.9
Western	4,547,687	6,298,075	8,874,862	Mbarara	26	55,276.6	21,342.4
Eastern	4,128,469	6,204,915	9,042,422	Mbale	32	39,478.8	15,242.8
Northern	3,151,955	5,148,882	7,188,139	Gulu	30	85,391.7	32,969.9
Total	16,761,705	24,227,297	34,634,650		112	241,550.3	93,263.1

== See also ==
- List of regions of Uganda by Human Development Index
- Counties of Uganda
- Sub-counties of Uganda
- Uganda Local Governments Association
- ISO 3166-2:UG
