= 2022 Commonwealth Games Queen's Baton Relay =

- Host city: Birmingham, England
- Countries visited: All 72 Commonwealth Nations
- Distance: 90,000 miles
- Start date: 7 October 2021
- End date: 28 July 2022
- Baton designer: Birmingham Open Media. Raymont-Osman Product Design, Maokwo, Kajul

The Queen's Baton Relay for the 2022 Commonwealth Games covered 90,000 miles and visited 72 Commonwealth nations and territories from Birmingham Airport. The journey began at Buckingham Palace on 7 October 2021 and ended in Birmingham during the opening ceremony on 28 July 2022.

This relay marked the last time under Queen Elizabeth II prior to her death on 8 September 2022.

== Organisation ==
The Relay was organised by the Birmingham Organising Committee for the 2022 Commonwealth Games, a private company based at One Brindleyplace. The 14-strong board of directors includes Dame Louise Martin, Ellie Simmonds, OBE, Nick Timothy and Ama Agbeze, MBE.

== The Queen's baton ==
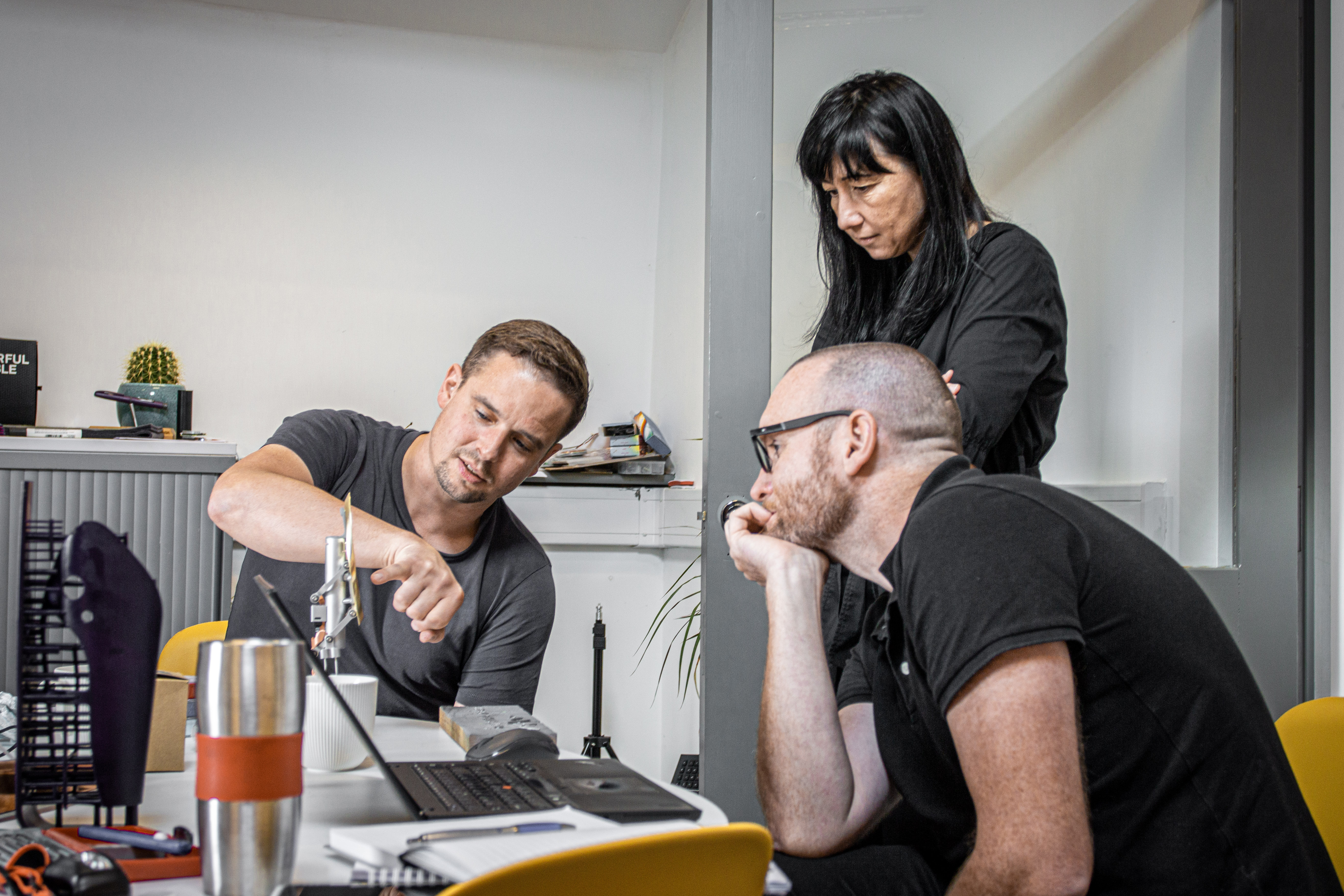
Tom Osman from Raymont-Osman, Karen Newman from BOM and Shaun Crummey from Birmingham 2022 test the mechanism for the Queen's message chamber

Designed and manufactured in the West Midlands by a collaborative team including Technologist Karen Newman of Birmingham Open Media (BOM), Designers and Engineers Kelly Raymont-Osman and Tom Osman of Raymont-Osman Product Design, artist Laura Nyahuye of Maokwo, and Engineer and Modelmaker Karl Hamlin of Kajul Ltd, the baton features a platinum strand along its length to commemorate the Platinum Jubilee of Elizabeth II in 2022. Made using the traditional method of lost-wax casting, apart from the platinum the baton has purposely been made from non-precious metals and alloys: copper, aluminium and brass to represent the gold, silver and bronze medals awarded at the games. It includes a camera, a heart-rate monitor, an atmospheric sensor and lights that change each time the baton is passed from person to person.

== International route ==
The route of the Queen's baton relay took in all Commonwealth countries and territories during a 294-day schedule.

=== Africa ===
Nations & territories	Dates	Selected batonbearers
Nigeria	16 October: Nnamdi Azikiwe International Airport (Abuja); Moshood Abiola National Stadium (Abuja); Aduvie International School (Abuja); British High Commission (Abuja); 17 October: Jabi Lake (Abuja); Abuja	Abaiola Joy Jonathan, a student at Aduvie International School in Jahi, Abuja
The Gambia	20 October: Banjul International Airport (Banjul); July 22 Square (Banjul); Aduvie International School (Banjul); Banjul Coconut Beach Project (Banjul); Mayoral Palace (Banjul); Denton Bridge (Banjul); Kanifing; 21 October: Abuko Nature Reserve (Abuko); Governor’s Office (Brikama); Lamin Lodge (Lamin); British High Commission (Banjul)	Dawda Barry, a teenage sprinter
Sierra Leone	23 October: Lungi International Airport (Lungi); Aberdeen; Sierra Leone House of Parliament (Freetown); State House (Freetown)); Cotton Tree (Freetown); 24 October: Sussex; York; Kent; Benguema Military Academy, (Benguema)	Julius Maada Bio, president since 2018
Ghana	26 October: Jubilee House (Accra); El Wak Stadium (Accra); Valco Roundabout (Tema); Harbour Road (Tema); Tema Fishing Harbour (Tema); 27 October: Manhyia Palace (Kumasi); Rattray Park (Kumasi); Bonwire; Ntonso	Former Sunderland footballer Asamoah Gyan
Cameroon	29 October: Government Primary School Bastos (Yaoundé); Ministry of Sport and Physical Education building (Yaoundé); British High Commission (Yaoundé); 30 October: Reunification Monument (Yaoundé); National Museum of Cameroon (Yaoundé); ENEO building (Yaoundé); Immeuble T Bella (Yaoundé); City Council Courtyard (Yaoundé)	Ayuk Otay Arrey Sophina, a judoka who competed at the Tokyo Olympics
Kenya	2 November: British High Commission (Nairobi); Nairobi Arboretum (Nairobi); Uhuru Park View Point (Nairobi); 3 November: Ngong Hills (Ngong)	Faith Ogallo, a taekwondo champion and environmentalist
Uganda	5 November: Ministry of Education and Sports building (Kampala); British High Commission (Kampala); 6 November: Entebbe Wildlife Sanctuary (Entebbe); Equator Monument (Kayabwe); Lake Victoria; Ngamba Island Chimpanzee Sanctuary; State House (Entebbe); Youth Sport Uganda (Kampala)	Ritah Asiimwe, a para-badminton Olympian, and Olympic Boxer Shadir Musa Bwogi
Rwanda	9 November: Kigali International Airport (Kigali); Kigali Genocide Memorial (Kigali); Nyandungu Urban Wetland Eco-Tourism Park (Kigali); Lycée de Kigali (Kigali); 10 November: Campaign Against Genocide Museum, Parliament of Rwanda (Kigali); Equator Monument (Kayabwe); Lake Victoria; Ngamba Island Chimpanzee Sanctuary; Rwanda Cricket Stadium (Kigali); BK Arena (Kigali)	Munezero Valentine, a member of the national volleyball team
Tanzania	12 November: Jakaya M. Kikwete Youth Park (Dar es Salaam); Uhuru Monument (Dar es Salaam); Clock Tower (Dar es Salaam); Askari Monument (Dar es Salaam); British High Commission (Dar es Salaam); British High Commission (Dar es Salaam); British High Commission (Dar es Salaam); National Museum of Tanzania (Dar es Salaam); Ikulu (Dar es Salaam); 13 November: Changuu	Filbert Bayi, Olympic middle distance runner
Malawi	16 November: Chileka International Airport (Blantyre); Blantyre Civic Centre (Blantyre); Makata Road (Blantyre); St Michael and All Angels Church (Blantyre); Blantyre Clock Tower (Blantyre); Old Boma (Blantyre); 17 November: Mulanje Civic Centre (Mulanje); Chuitsi Junction (Mulanje); Mulanje Boma (Mulanje); Luchenza; Bvumbwe Market	Mary Waya, whose foundation tackles local issues such as child marriage and abuse
Zambia	19 November: Kenneth Kaunda International Airport (Kusaka); Lusaka Civic Centre (Lusaka); Kafue; 20 November: Livingstone Civic Centre (Livingstone); Zambezi (Livingstone); Victoria Falls (Livingstone)	Enock Mwewa, a 22-year-old climate justice activist who co-founded Environment Savers of Zambia
Mozambique	23 November: Maputo International Airport (Maputo); Maputo City Hall (Maputo); 24 November: Marracuene; Komati River; Hobjana Community Garden; Obra Dom Orione Moçambique (Maputo); Parque dos Continuadores (Maputo); Eduardo Mondlane University (Maputo); Maputo–Katembe bridge (Katembe); Mafalala (Maputo); Xipamanine (Maputo); KaMaxaquene (Maputo)	
Mauritius	27 November: State House (Moka); Pointe d'Esny (Mahebourg); Île aux Aigrettes; Mahebourg Waterfront (Mahebourg); Mahebourg Museum (Mahebourg); 28 November: Parliament House (Port Louis); Mauritius Postal Museum (Port Louis); Beau Bassin-Rose Hill	Noemi Alphonse, a para-athlete who carried the Baton around the Mahébourg waterfront
Botswana	30 November: Tshwaragano Junior Secondary School (Toteng); Toteng Kgotla (Toteng); Sehithwa; 1 December: Maun Kgotla (Maun)	Oganne Manengene, a female entrepreneur from the remote Northwest District
Saint Helena	5 December: Ruperts; Alarm Forest; Diana's Peak; Blue Hill; Whitegate; Cape Villa; New Ground; Ebony View; Half Tree Hollow; Community Care Complex; Mule Yard (Jamestown); 6 December: Plantation House (Jamestown); Prince Andrew School; Jacob's Ladder; Jamestown Seafront (Jamestown); Plantation House (Jamestown)	Josh Herne, who lives off grid
South Africa	8 to 11 December 2021	Bongiwe Msomi, netball manager and coach at the University of Johannesburg
Namibia	14 & 15 December 2021	Emily James, a charity worker with Elephant Human Relations Aid (EHRA)
Eswatini	17 & 18 December 2021	Thabiso Dlamini, a Swazi boxer who competed at the Tokyo Olympics
Lesotho	20 & 21 December 2021	Michelle Tau, a 24-year-old taekwondo practitioner
Seychelles	23 & 24 December 2021	Laurence Hoareau and Dailus Laurence, wardens of the island of Praslin

=== The Americas ===
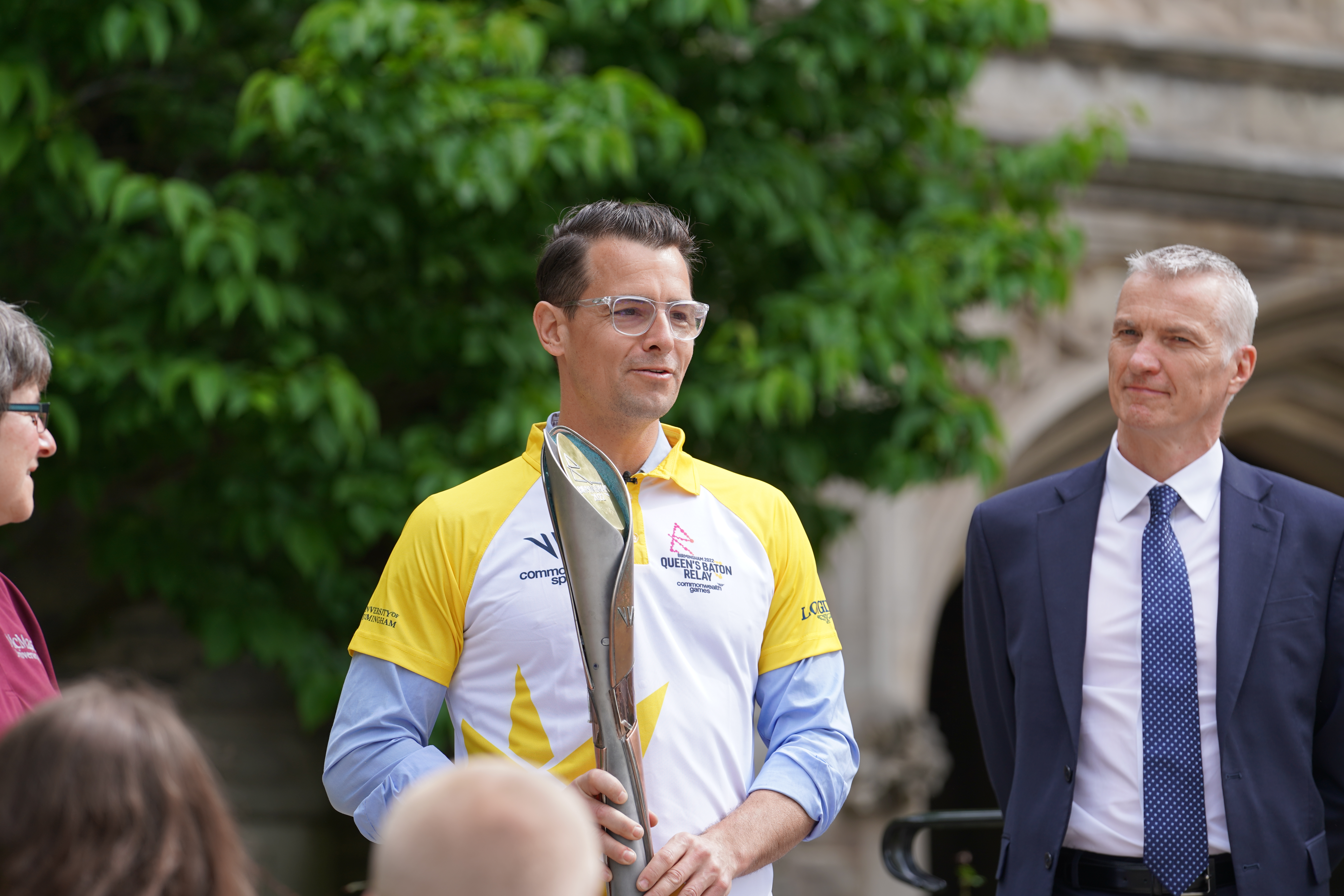
Canadian sprint kayaker Adam van Koeverden holds the baton at an event at McMaster University, Hamilton

Nations & territories	Dates	Selected batonbearers
Belize	23 & 24 March 2022	Chris Guydis, who makes canoes by hand
Guyana	26 & 27 March 2022	Walter Grant-Stuart, a firefighter and the country's first para-athlete
Grenada	30 & 31 March 2022	Anderson Peters, a world champion javelin thrower, and Paralympian Ishona Charles
The Bahamas	3 & 4 April 2022	Vashni 'Metro' Thompson and Austin Green, representing the Bahamian Special Olympics
Turks and Caicos Islands	7 & 8 April 2022	Velma Gardiner, a community activist
Cayman Islands	12 & 13 April 2022	The head boy and head girl of West End Primary School and Layman E Scott High School
Jamaica	15 to 17 April 2022	Shauna-Kay Hines, who represented Jamaica in taekwondo at the 2020 Summer Paralympics
Trinidad and Tobago	19 & 20 April 2022	Jehue Gordon, a champion hurdler
Barbados	23 & 24 April 2022	Brianna Holder, an international netball player, and West Indies cricketer Aaliyah Alleyne
Montserrat	26 & 27 April 2022	Students from Montserrat Secondary School
Dominica	29 & 30 April 2022	Adicia Burton, who represents Kalinago on the National Youth Council of Dominica and plays volleyball and cricket
British Virgin Islands	3 & 4 May 2022	Damir Dobson, a pupil at Francis Lettsome Primary School
Saint Kitts and Nevis	6 & 7 May 2022	Kim Collins, a medal-winning sprinter at the 2002 Commonwealth Games
Anguilla	9 & 10 May 2022	Ursula Connor, a 108-year-old centenarian
Antigua and Barbuda	13 & 14 May 2022	Dwayne Fleming, a sprinter, and Ethan Greene, a swimmer
Saint Lucia	16 & 17 May 2022	Daren Sammy, the island's first international cricketer
Saint Vincent and the Grenadines	19 & 20 May 2022	Darren Morgan and Marika Baptiste, two youth athletes
Bermuda	22 & 23 May 2022	Paula Wight of the Bermuda pilot gig club
Canada	26 to 29 May 2022	Briana da Silva, a student athlete at McMaster University
Falkland Islands	7 & 8 June 2022	Trudi Clarke, Chris Locke and Garry Tyrell, members of the islands' Lawn Bowls team

=== Asia ===
Nations & territories	Dates	Selected batonbearers
Pakistan	27 to 29 December 2021	Aqsa Dawood, a football player who represents Pakistan as a youth social ambassador for the Asian Football Federation
Maldives	1 & 2 January 2022	Hashim Aboobakur, an environmental activist
Sri Lanka	4 & 5 January 2022	Jayanthi Kuru-Utumpala, the first Sri Lankan to summit Mount Everest
Bangladesh	7 to 9 January 2022	Ruman Shana, an archer from Khulna District
India	12 to 15 January 2022	Vinisha Umashankar, the teenage inventor of a mobile, solar-powered ironing cart
Singapore	17 to 19 January 2022	Jen Goh, a golfer
Malaysia	22 to 24 January 2022	Samuel Isaiah, a teacher at a rural school for indigenous children from the Orang Asli population
Brunei	26 & 27 January 2022	A brigade of Gurkhas

=== Oceania ===
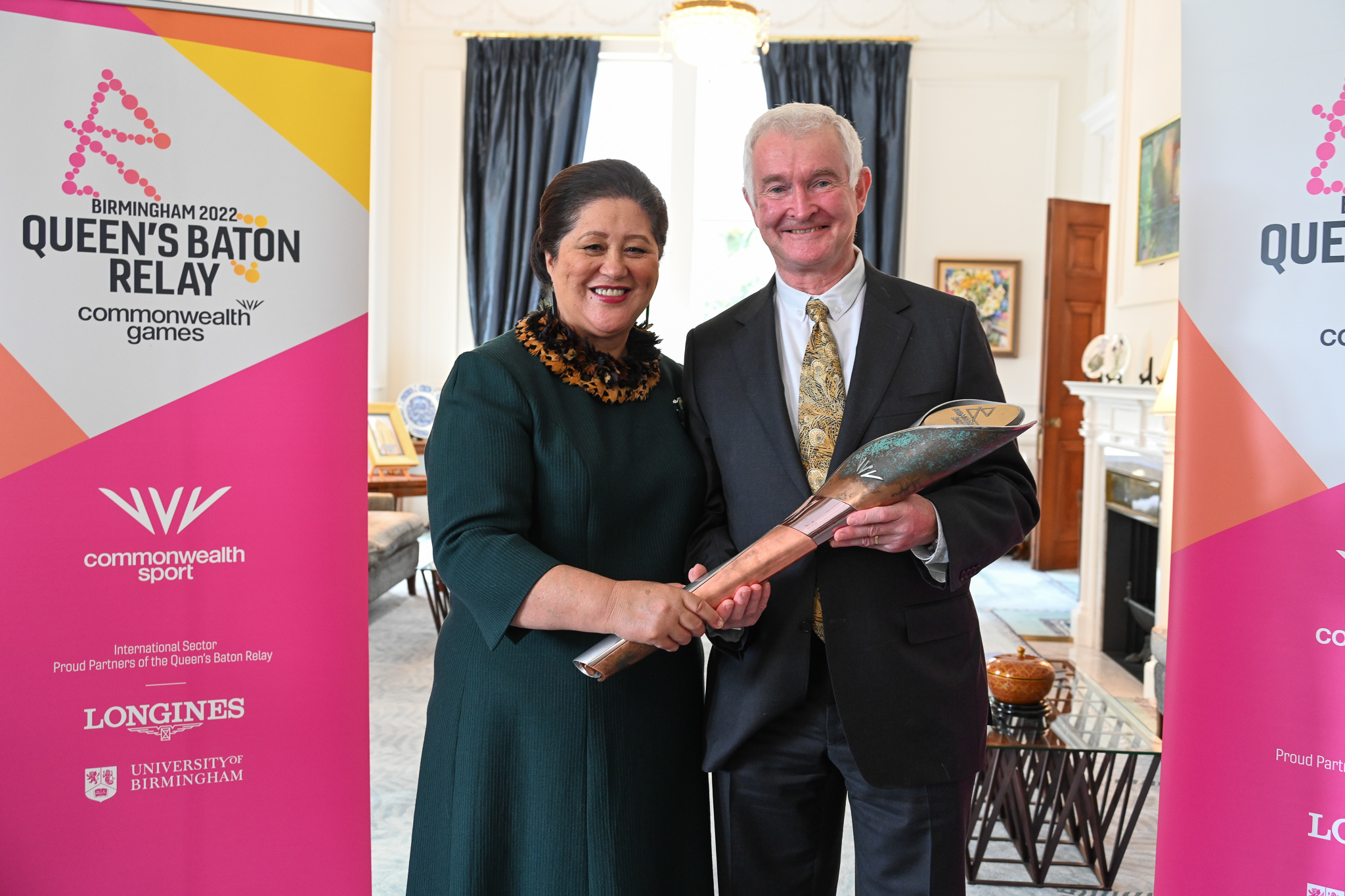
The governor-general of New Zealand, Cindy Kiro, and her viceregal consort Richard Davies hold the baton in Wellington

Nations & territories	Dates	Selected batonbearers
Papua New Guinea	30 & 31 January 2022	Michael Somare Jr, son of the country's first prime minister
Solomon Islands	2 & 3 February 2022	
Nauru	5 & 6 February 2022	Pupils from Nauru Secondary School
Fiji	13 & 14 February 2022	Rusila Nagasau and Jerry Tuwai, who captained Fiji's rugby sevens teams at the 2020 Summer Olympics.
Samoa	16 & 17 February 2022	Feagaiga Stowers, 2018 Commonwealth Games gold medalist.
Tonga	19 & 20 February 2022	Siueni Filimone and Ronald Fotofili, two track-and-field athletes
Vanuatu	22 & 23 February 2022	Ati George Sokomanu, who was president from 1984 to 1989
Kiribati	25 & 26 February 2022	Martin Moreti, the minister for Women, Youth, Sports and Social Affairs in the Cabinet of Kiribati
Tuvalu	28 February & 1 March 2022	The Captain Superintendent of Tuvalu Maritime School
Niue	3 & 4 March 2022	Feuina Tukuitoga Viviani and other children from Niue Primary School
Cook Islands	6 & 7 March 2022	
Norfolk Island	9 & 10 March 2022	Pony Club member PJ Wilson riding a horse called 'Big Girl'
New Zealand	12 to 15 March 2022	Alexis Pritchard, a boxer, and hockey goalkeeper Kyle Pontifex
Australia	17 to 20 March 2022	Kelsey Cottrell, an international lawn bowler, and freestyle swimmer Lani Pallister

=== Europe ===
Nations & territories	Dates	Selected batonbearers
Cyprus	9 October: Larnaca International Airport (Larnaca); Petra tou Romiou (Paphos); Paphos Castle (Paphos); Kourion (Episkopi); Limassol; 10 October: Dereboyu Avenue (Nicosia); North Nicosia (Nicosia); Foinikoudes (Larnaca); Church of Saint Lazarus (Larnaca); Nissi Beach (Ayia Napa); Konnos Bay (Ayia Napa); Fig Tree Bay (Protaras); Museum of Underwater Sculpture (Ayia Napa); British High Commission (Nicosia)	Kyriakos Ioannou, a high jumper who won medals at two Commonwealth Games: Melbourne 2006 and Glasgow 2014
Malta	12 October: Malta International Airport (Luqa); St Thomas More College (Żejtun); Rotunda of Mosta (Mosta); San Anton Palace (Attard); Dar tal-Providenza Siġġiewi (Lija); 13 October: Rabat; Dar il-Madonna tal-Mellieha (Mellieħa); St. Paul's Bay; Pembroke; St. Julian's; Dingli; British High Commission (Ta' Xbiex)	Thomas Borg, a para-athlete, and Yasmin Zammit Stevens, a weightlifter
Gibraltar	31 May & 1 June 2022	Members of the Gibraltar Health Authority
England (1)	2 to 6 June 2022	Tom Matthews, a technician who organised a virtual relay during the COVID-19 lockdown to raise money for Mind
Jersey	10 & 11 June 2022	Morag Obarska and Jean Cross, two sports volunteers at Samarès Manor
Guernsey	13 & 14 June 2022	The Guernsey women's cricket team
Isle of Man	16 & 17 June 2022	Bill Dale, founder of the coastal clean-up group Beach Buddies
Scotland	18 to 22 June 2022	Erin Guild, a young fundraiser for people with the disease cystinosis
Northern Ireland	23 to 27 June 2022	John McErlane, co-founder of the dementia charity Dementia NI
Wales	29 June to 3 July 2022	Marc Falloon, an RNLI volunteer crewmember of the Holyhead lifeboats
England (2)	4 to 28 July 2022	Janet Inman, a non-executive director of the Volleyball England Foundation

== England National route ==
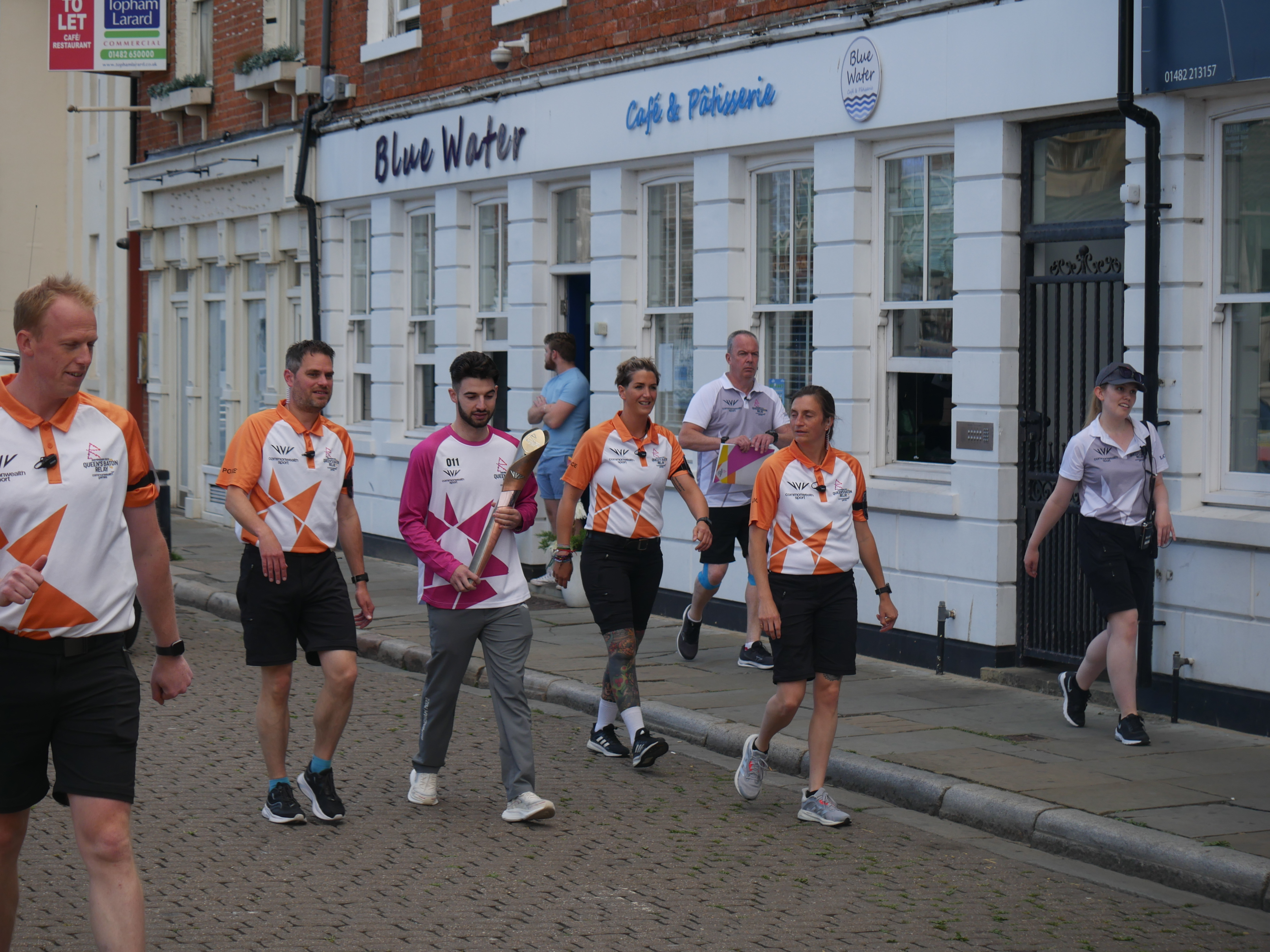
The baton being carried through Kingston upon Hull on 13 July

The baton is due to travel around London from 2–6 June 2022 and the rest of England during July.

English regions	Dates	Selected batonbearers
London (2 June: Battersea Power Station 4 June: Paternoster Square 5 June: Queen Elizabeth Olympic Park and Royal Docks)	2 to 6 June 2022	Lemona Chanda, a Bangladeshi-born gender equality activist who promotes women's rights
South West England (4 July: The Eden Project, Plymouth, Exeter, the Isle of Portland, Poole, Bournemouth 5 July: Devizes, Bath, Bristol, Hereford, Gloucester and Cheltenham)	4 & 5 July 2022	Mark Richardson, who manages the Exeter food bank
South East England (6 July: Stoke Mandeville, Maidenhead, Eton, Windsor, Aldershot, Winchester, Southampton, Portsmouth and the Isle of Wight 7 July: Guildford, Tonbridge, Canterbury, Folkestone, Deal and Dover)	6 & 7 July 2022	Courtney Hughes, a student nursing associate who founded the Secret Santa charity in Didcot
East of England (8 July: Gravesend, Tilbury, Basildon, Southend-on-Sea, Maldon, Waltham Cross, Luton and Hemel Hempstead 9 July: King's Lynn, Great Yarmouth, Bury St Edmunds, Hinxton and Cambridge)	8 & 9 July 2022	Colin Jackson, a Welsh former sprinter and hurdler who also appeared on Strictly Come Dancing.
East Midlands (10 July: Northampton, Corby, Rutland, Leicester, Nottingham and Lincoln 11 July: Skegness, Boston, Grantham, Loughborough, Derby, Bakewell and Buxton)	10 & 11 July 2022	Shabaz Arshad, who chairs a grassroots football team in Derby
Yorkshire and The Humber	12 & 13 July 2022	Zoe Barratt and Colin Lea, two charity workers in York
North East England	14 & 15 July 2022	Medal-winning race-walker Johanna Atkinson
North West England	16 & 17 July 2022	Tony Howarth, an ultra-marathon runner from Lytham St Anne's who volunteers for the Samaritans
West Midlands	18 to 28 July 2022	Kyle Evans, a BMX rider who competes internationally Paul Darke, a Wolverhampton artist and disability rights campaigner

== See also ==
- Queen's Baton Relay
- 2018 Commonwealth Games Queen's Baton Relay
- Official website
