= Environmental Conservation Trust of Uganda =

Non-governmental conservation organization based in Uganda

The Environmental Conservation Trust of Uganda
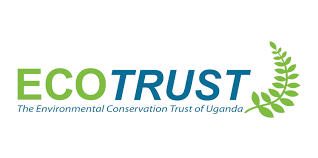
- Abbreviation: ECOTRUST
- Formation: 1999-07-06
- Type: Non-governmental organization
- Headquarters: Plot 1034, Palm Ave, Lubowa Housing Estate, Entebbe Road, Kampala, Uganda
- Location: Kampala, Uganda
- Region served: Uganda
- Executive Director: Pauline Nantongo Kalunda
- Website: ecotrust.or.ug

The Environmental Conservation Trust of Uganda (ECOTRUST) is a Uganda based not-for- profit and non-governmental organization. It is a conservation organization whose aim is to conserve and improve biological diversity and social welfare through sustainable environmental management. ECOTRUST works on a principle of delivering conservation funds and finances.

== Overview ==
Established in 1999, ECOTRUST operates national wide within Uganda with its concentration on three main landscapes with the country which are; Murchison-Semliki landscape in the Albertine region of South-Western Uganda, Queen Elizabeth National Park landscape and Mount Elgon Landscape in Eastern Uganda. All these are internationally recognized as biodiversity significance landscapes. These Landscapes are also zones for climate change induced disasters like floods, mud slides and changing weather patterns which cause frequent and unexpected droughts and prolonged rainy seasons.

== Funding and aponsorship ==
The World Land Trust(WLT) is one of the funders of ECOTRUST which funded supported the establishment of a Corridor Restoration Fund (CRF) that drove the restoration of forest connectivity corridors between Bugoma and Budongo forest reserves in the Murchison Landscape of Western Uganda the so called Bugoma-Budongo Corridor). United Nations Development Programme (UNDP), Bangladesh Rural Advancement Committee (BRAC) and the Ministry of Water & Environment (MWE) funded ECOTRUST under a project called Restoration of Wetlands and Associated Catchments (ADA) Project in Eastern Uganda.

This project was conducted in five districts that have direct access to Lake Kyoga; Butaleja, Budaka, Kibuku, Namutumba, and Kaliro.

== Organizational values ==
ECOTRUST core values are Accountability to ourselves, to the organization, and to the people they work with, Transparency where their success is based on building Trust, Integrity, Excellence and Teamwork

== See also ==
Ngamba Island Chimpanzee Sanctuary
