= Laura Nyahuye =

Zimbabwean artist

- Known for: Maokwo
- Notable work: body adornments, the Queen's Baton for the 2022 Commonwealth Games

Laura Nyahuye (born June 1975) is a Zimbabwean artist and designer, based in Coventry, United Kingdom. She founded Maokwo, a community arts organisation. She specialises in body adornments. In 2021, the Maokwo team collaborated with BOM, Kajul and Raymont-Osman to design the Queen's Baton for the 2022 Commonwealth Games. Her work addresses social issues such as lack of inclusion in the arts sector for artists of colour. Laura is portrayed as a storyteller, mother, designer/maker, writer, curator, performer, artist, changemaker and advocate.

== Career ==
Laura makes wearable body adornments and challenges perceptions and issues that have something to do with women and migrant communities. Laura's work was said to be “driven by the desire to see a better tomorrow for the next generation, to see a flicker of hope in the eyes of a fellow woman and for communities to connect, despite race, language and religion.”

During the lockdown in 2020, Laura was involved in an online festival via Zoom for the visual, film and performance art conversation. The online conversation featured discussions on the daily lives of asylum seekers, refugees and migrants under a research project. The event examined linguistic diversity at Birmingham City University and the University of Oxford. It was commissioned by Slanguages for Humans’ experiences in Coventry.

In 2021, Laura had a four-month digital residency with Mounir Neddi, Soufiane Hennani, and Melissandre Varin. Their experiences were shared in a 60minutes Zoom titled, “Cities of Cultures: Sharing Practices of Storytelling between Casablanca and Coventry.” She partnered with Coventry University on a research project that examined the unique and exceptional role of Coventry and the Midlands in the foundation of the British Black Art Movement (BAM) in the 1980s. The project ran from January to June 2021.

== Publication ==
Boxed: Exploring Containment and Resilience in Times of Crisis.

== Awards ==
In 2018, Laura won Accessories Designer of the Year at the 2018 Fashions Finest Africa. Themed “Increasing Nigeria’s Participation in the Global Garment Production Industry”, the event took place at the Balmoral Centre, Federal Palace Hotel, Lagos.

Laura received a grant award for City of Culture 2021 projects. She partnered with Professor Heaven Crawley on the project.
