= Entebbe Wildlife Sanctuary =

Protected area in Wakiso District, Uganda

- IUCN category VI (protected area with sustainable use of natural resources)
- Location within Uganda
- Location: Uganda
- Coordinates: 0.057910°N 32.477290°E
- Area: 51.20 square kilometres (19.77 sq mi)
- Established: 1952 (status year)
- Governing body: Uganda Wildlife Conservation Education Centre

Entebbe Wildlife Sanctuary is a protected area in Entebbe, Wakiso District, Uganda, near the northern shore of Lake Victoria. The World Database on Protected Areas lists it as a Wildlife Sanctuary, IUCN Category VI, on a reported area kf 51.20 km².

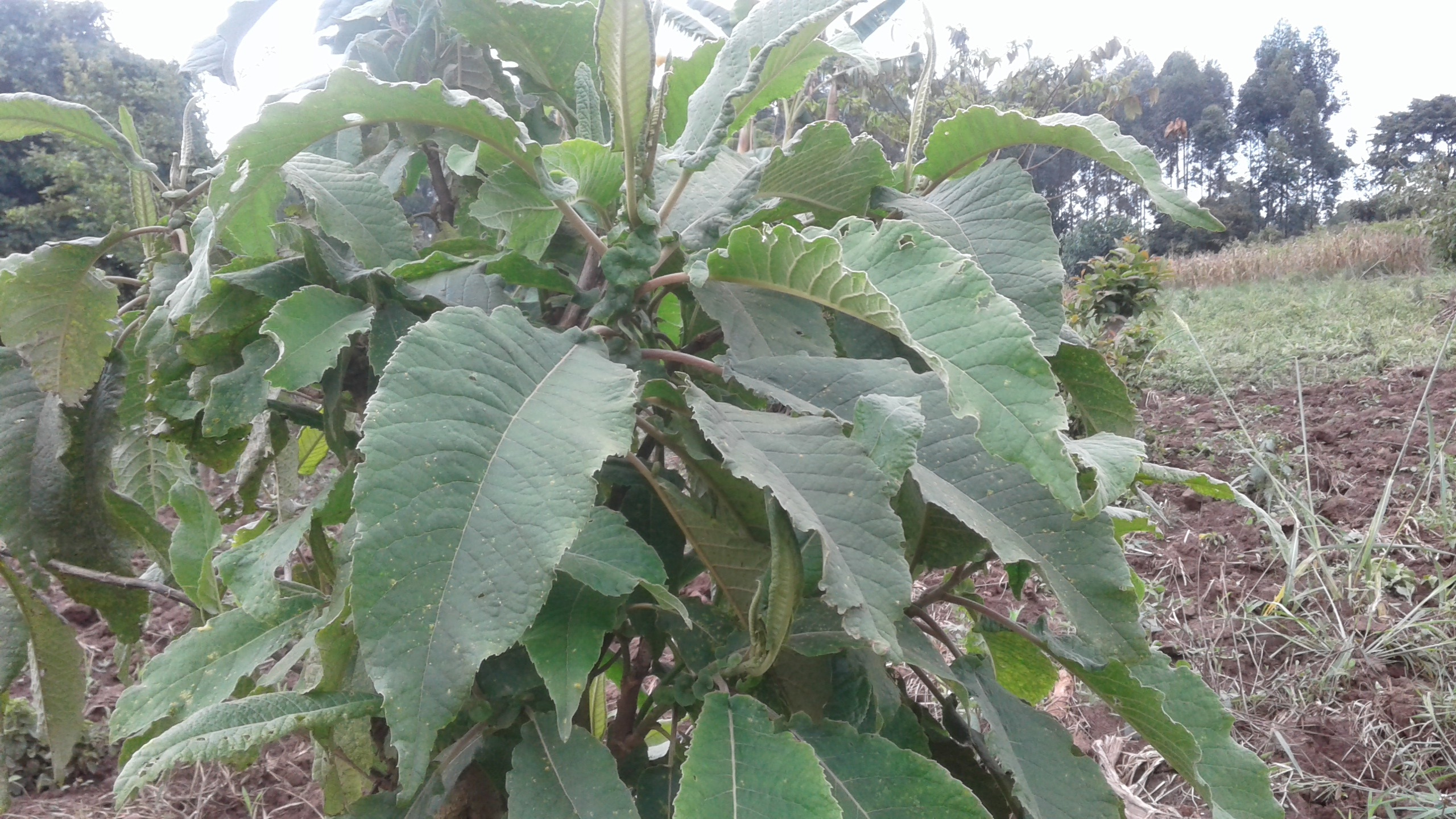
View of plant at the Uganda Wildlife Conservation Education Center

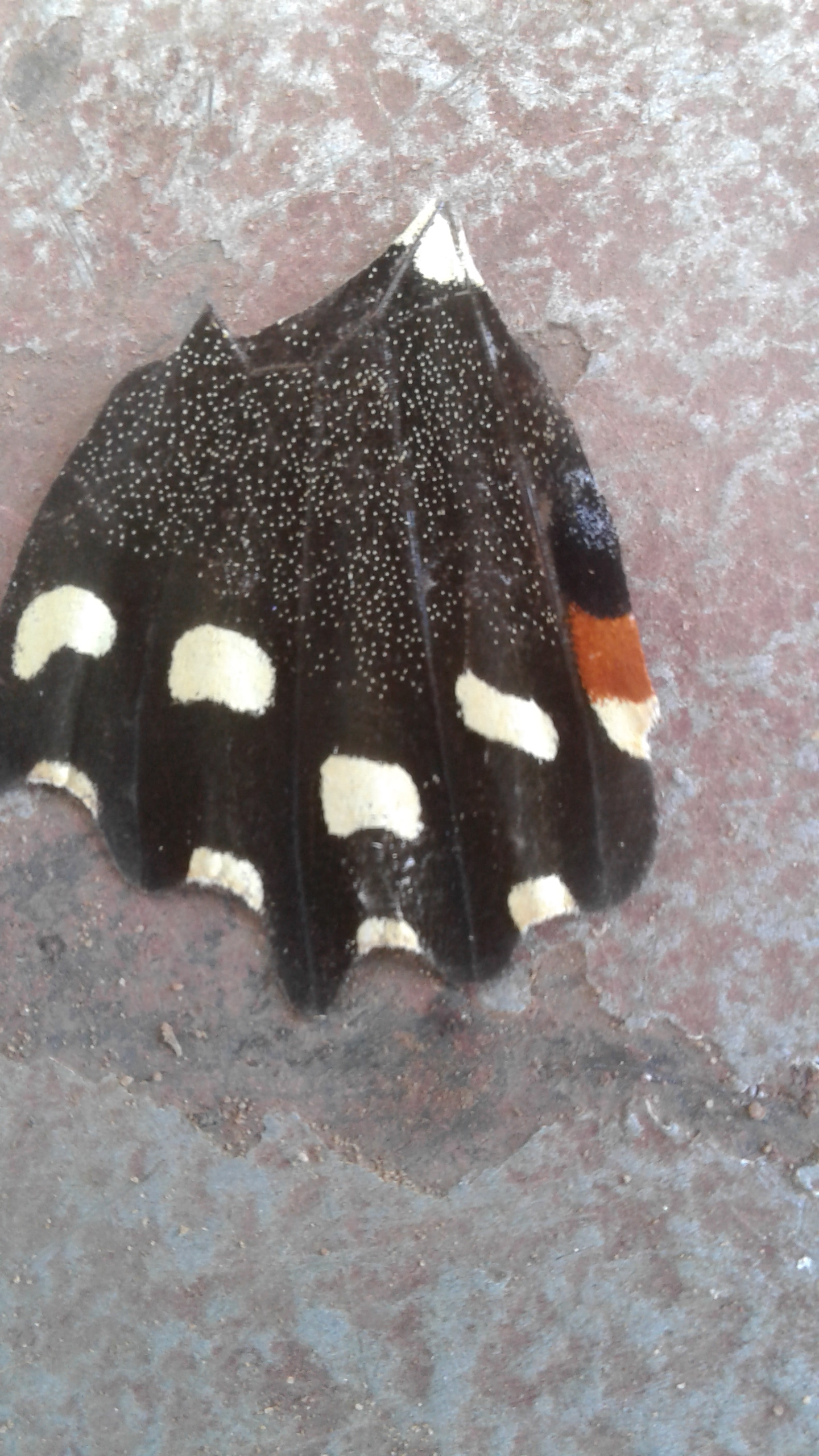
Butterfly at the Uganda Wildlife Conservation Education Center

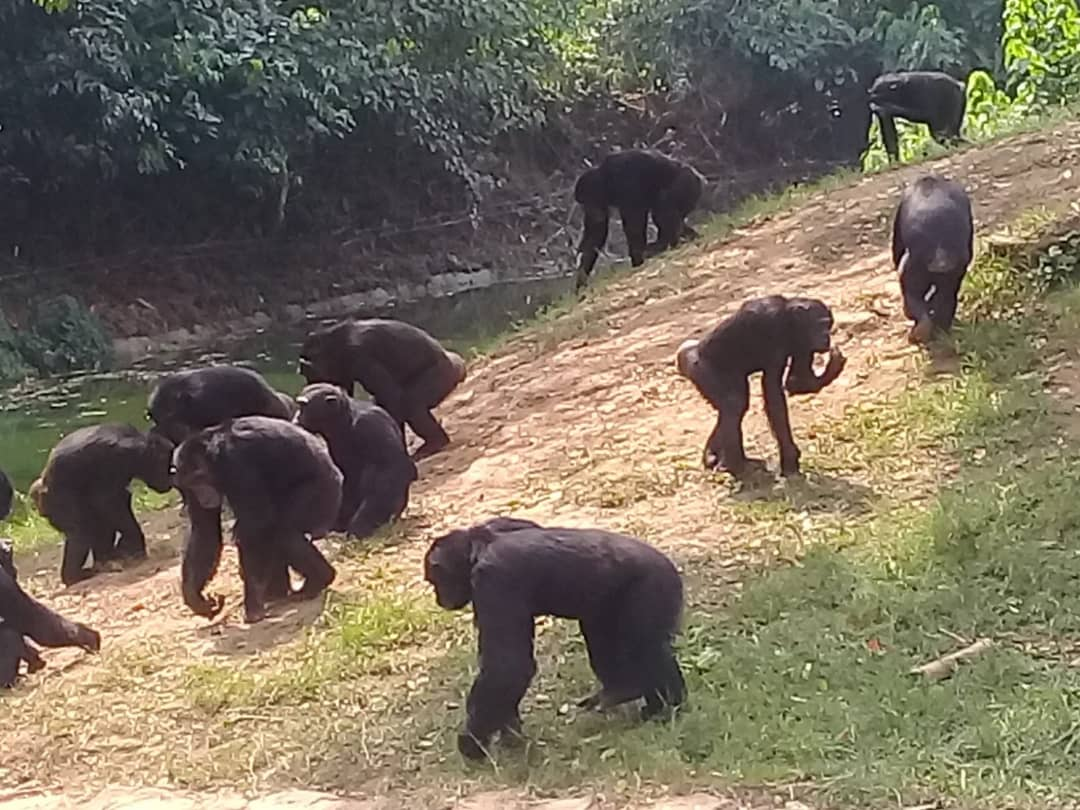
Chimpanzee meeting at the sanctuary

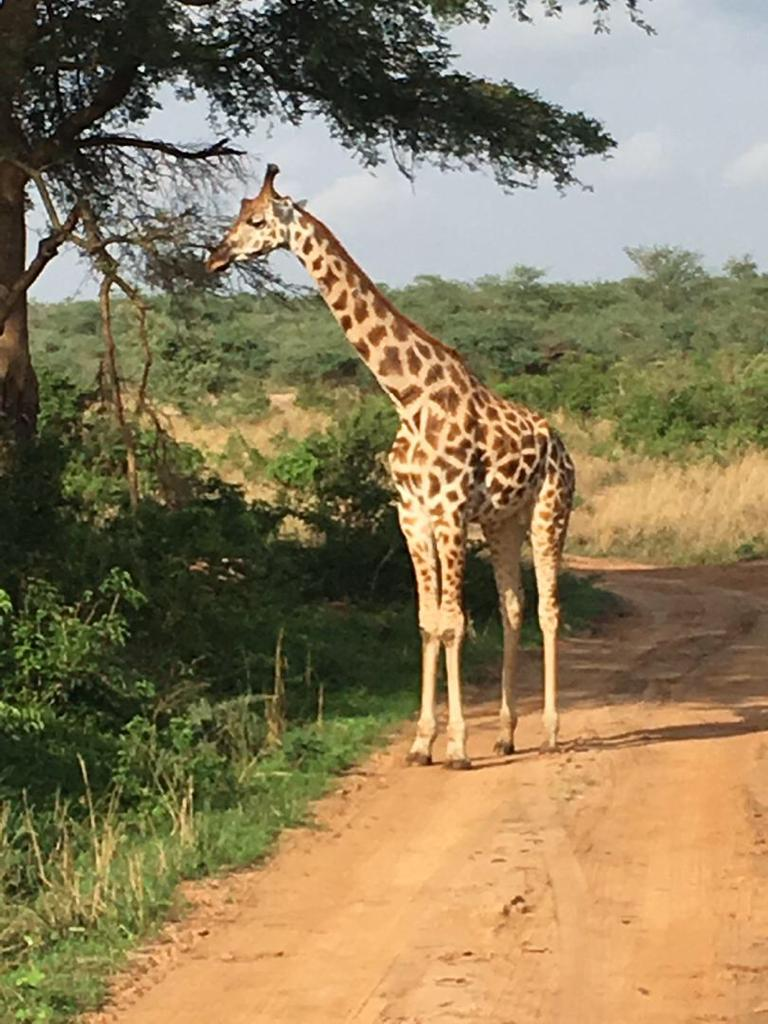
Giraffe feeding at the sanctuary

== Geography and setting ==
The World Database on Protected Areas lists a reported area of 51.20 km² and GIS area 53.83 km² for the protected area record named Entebbe (WDPA ID 7930). The centroid coordinate for the same record is 0.07343°N, 32.46328°E.

== Legal status ==
The World Database on Protected Areas lists status as Designated, with status year 1951. Ownership type is listed as State.

== Management and governance ==
The World Database on Protected Areas lists governance type as federal or national ministry or agency. Uganda Wildlife Authority manages protected areas in Uganda and lists wildlife sanctuaries among protected area types under management.

== History ==
In 1952, the colonial Games Department established Entebbe Animal Sanctuary as a reception centre for wildlife casualties, including sick, injured, orphaned animals, plus animals confiscated from illegal trade. In May 1994, a trust (UWEC Trust) was founded to take over the zoo for conservation education purposes. The Uganda Wildlife Conservation Education Centre Act, No. 27 of 2015 established Uganda Wildlife Education Centre (UWEC) as a statutory agency under the ministry responsible for wildlife, with a mandate for conservation education, plus a national role as a CITES animals rescue centre.

== Conservation, education, and wildlife care ==
Uganda Wildlife Education Centre (UWEC) describes veterinary and animal-keeper support for injured, sick, or stressed animals, plus quarantine services and breeding work focused on species at risk of extinction. The Ministry of Tourism, Wildlife and Antiquities describes UWEC as a statutory agency under the wildlife ministry, with a mandate for conservation education and a national CITES rescue-centre role.

== Visitor access ==
Uganda Wildlife Education Centre lists visitor access information for day visits in Entebbe, including opening hours, contact details, and published fees for several visitor categories.

== See also ==
Uganda Wildlife Conservation Education Centre
