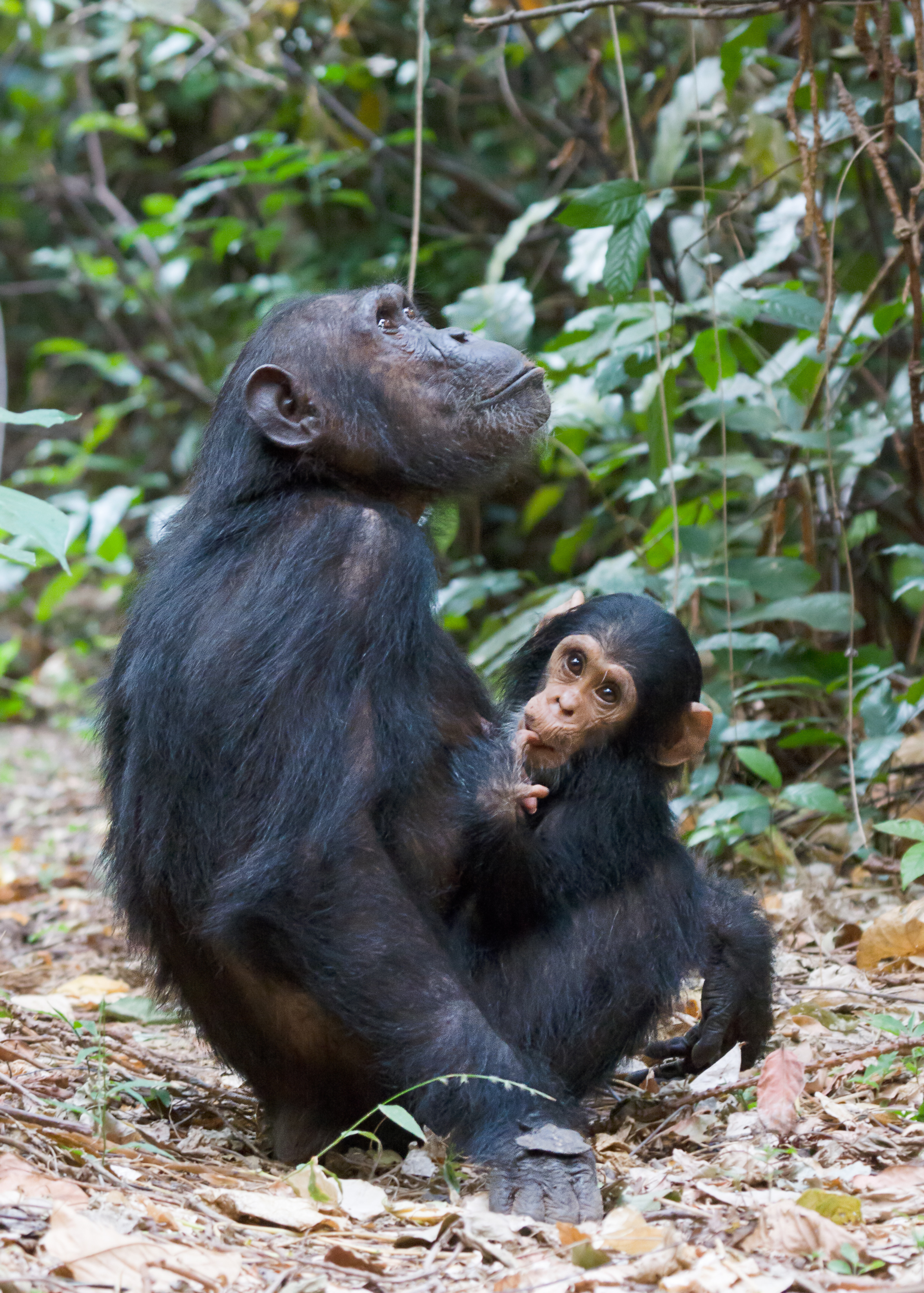
- A mother with a juvenile at Gombe Stream National Park, Tanzania

Conservation status
- Endangered (IUCN 3.1)

Scientific classification
- Kingdom: Animalia
- Phylum: Chordata
- Class: Mammalia
- Order: Primates
- Superfamily: Hominoidea
- Family: Hominidae
- Genus: Pan
- Species: P. troglodytes
- Subspecies: P. t. schweinfurthii

Trinomial name
- Pan troglodytes schweinfurthii (Giglioli, 1872)
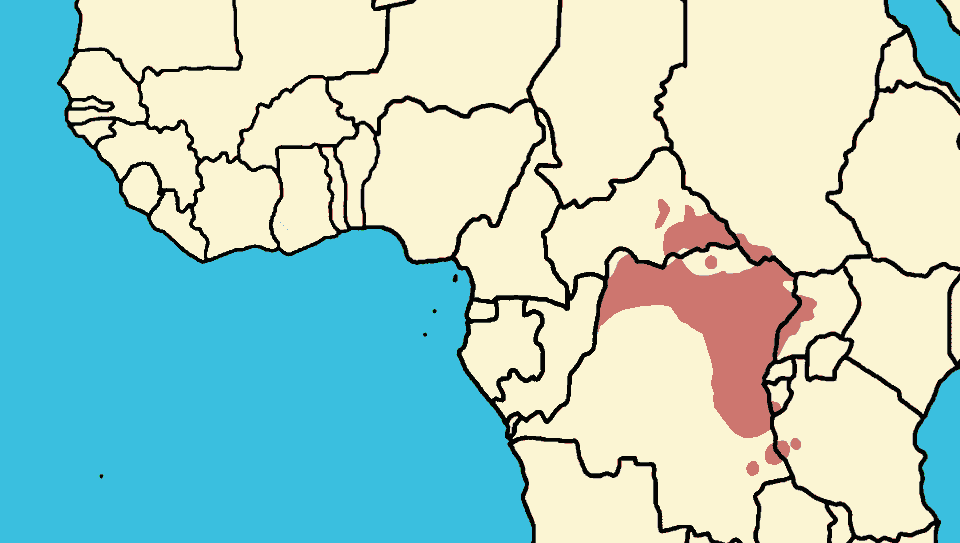

= Eastern chimpanzee =

Subspecies of ape

The eastern chimpanzee (Pan troglodytes schweinfurthii) is a subspecies of the common chimpanzee. It is native to the Central African Republic, South Sudan, the Democratic Republic of the Congo, Uganda, Rwanda, Burundi, and Tanzania.

== Taxonomy ==
Though it is formally classified as P. t. schweinfurthii, Colin Groves of the Australian National University argues that there is enough variation between the northern and southern populations of this population of chimpanzees to be split into two subspecies instead of one; the northern population as P. t. schweinfurthii and the southern population as P. t. marungensis.

== Threats and conservation ==
The 2007 IUCN Red List classified them as Endangered. Although the common chimpanzee is the most abundant and widespread of the non-human great apes, recent declines in East Africa are expected to continue due to hunting and loss of habitat. Because chimpanzees and humans are physiologically very similar, chimpanzees succumb to many diseases that afflict humans. If not properly managed, research and tourism also present a risk of disease transmission between humans and chimpanzees. This subspecies has been extensively studied by Dr. Jane Goodall at Gombe Stream National Park.

== Physical description ==
Adult chimpanzees in the wild weigh between 40 and 65 kilograms (88 and 143 pounds). Males can measure up to 145 centimetres (57 inches) and females up to 120 centimetres (47 inches) in height. The chimpanzee's body is covered with coarse black hair, except for the face, fingers, toes, palms of the hands, and soles of the feet. Both of its thumbs and its big toes are opposable, allowing a precision grip. Like most chimpanzee populations, the eastern chimpanzees have amber to brown irises and dark sclerae.

== Habitat ==
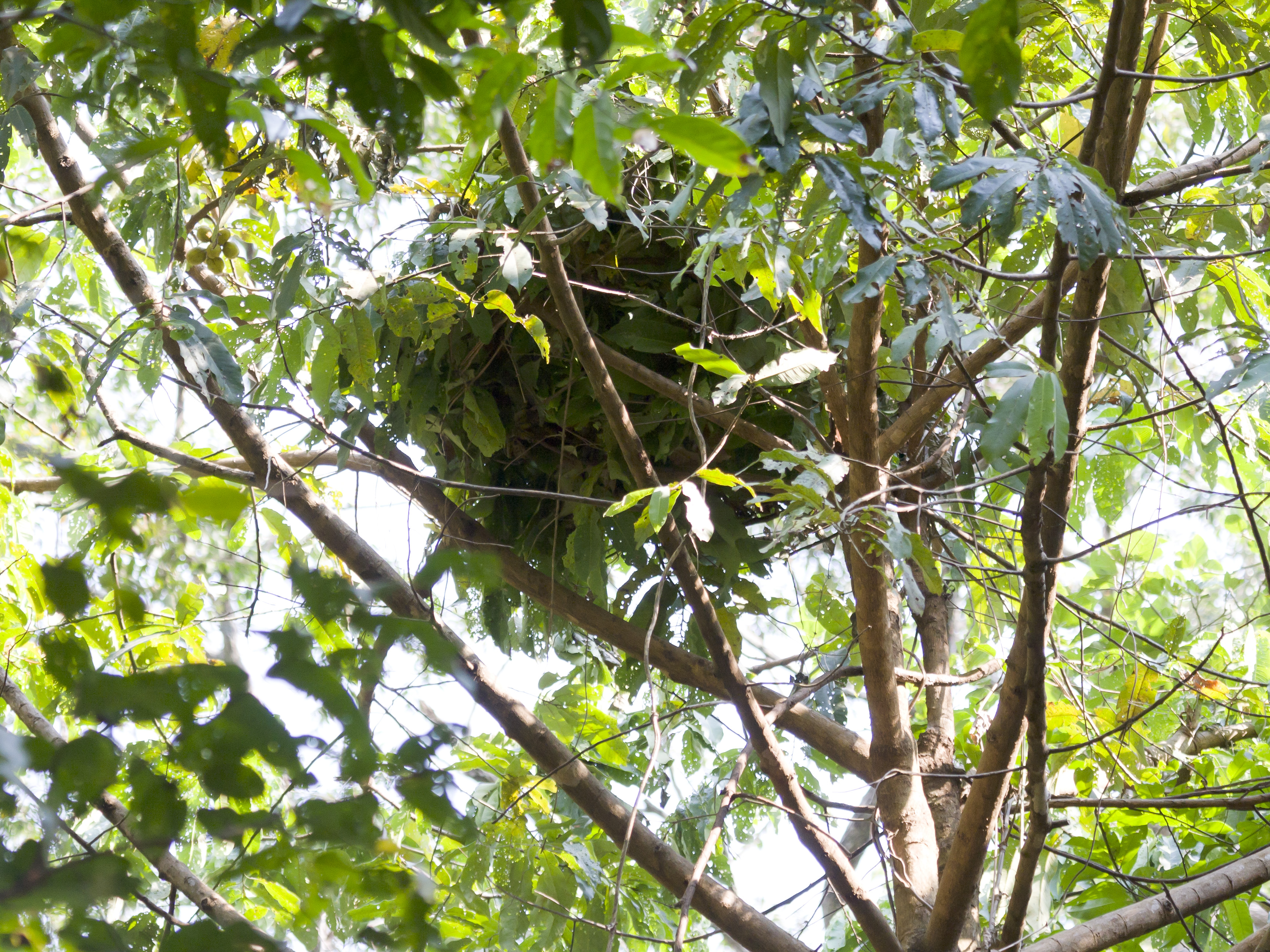
A nest on a tree where chimpanzees sleep overnight

The chimpanzee spends time both in trees and on the ground, but usually sleeps in a tree, where it builds a nest for the night. They once inhabited most of this region, but their habitat has been dramatically reduced in recent years.

== Behaviour and ecology ==
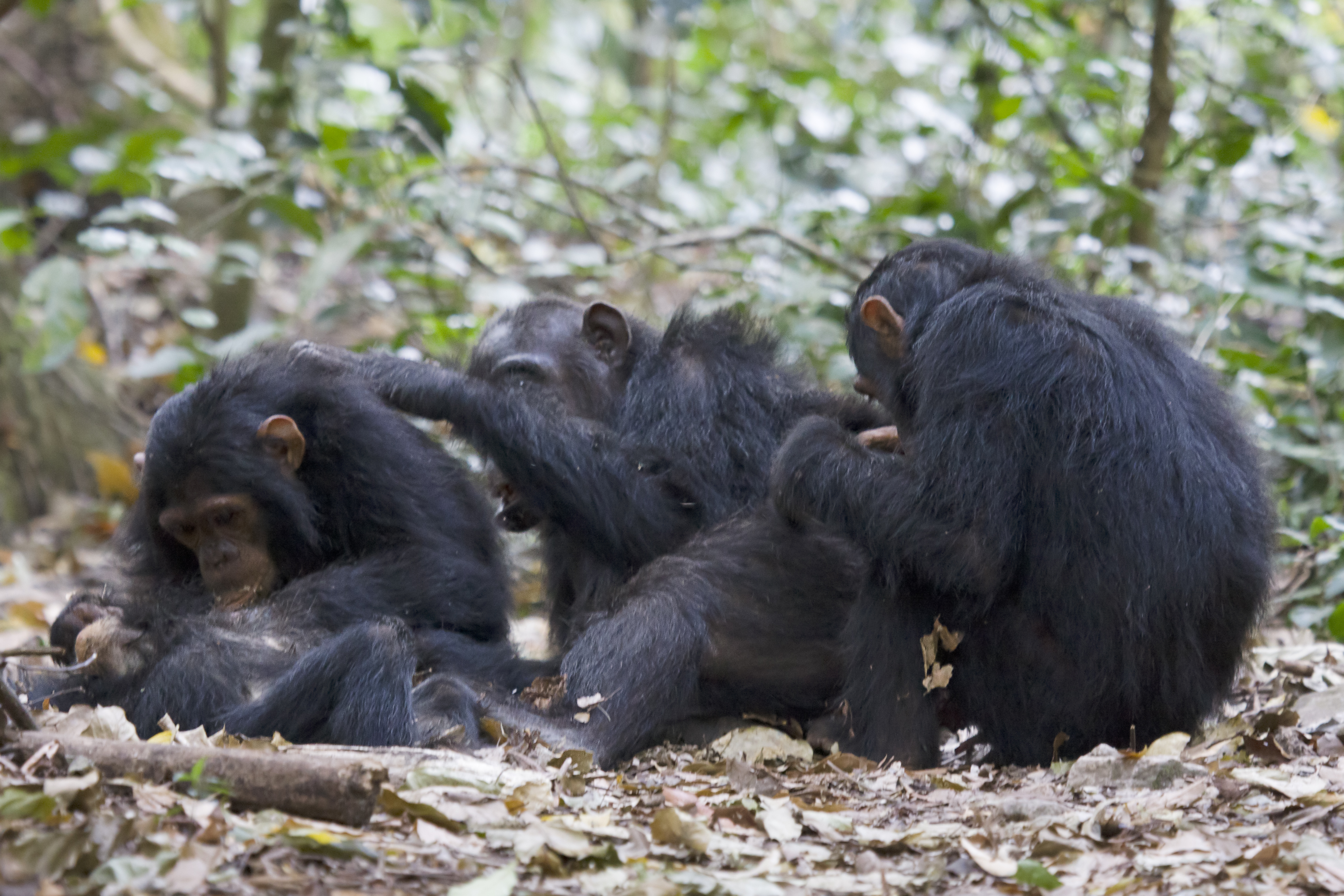
A group of chimpanzees grooming

Chimpanzees live in communities of typically 20 to more than 150 members, but spend most of their time traveling in small parties of just a few individuals. The eastern chimpanzee is both arboreal and terrestrial and rests in trees at night, but spends the day on the ground.

Chimpanzees walk using the soles of their feet and their knuckles, and they can walk upright for short distances. They are 'knuckle walkers'.

When confronted by a predator, chimpanzees will react with loud screams and use any object they can get against the threat. The leopard is the chimpanzee's main natural predator, but they have also fallen prey to lions.

=== Diet ===
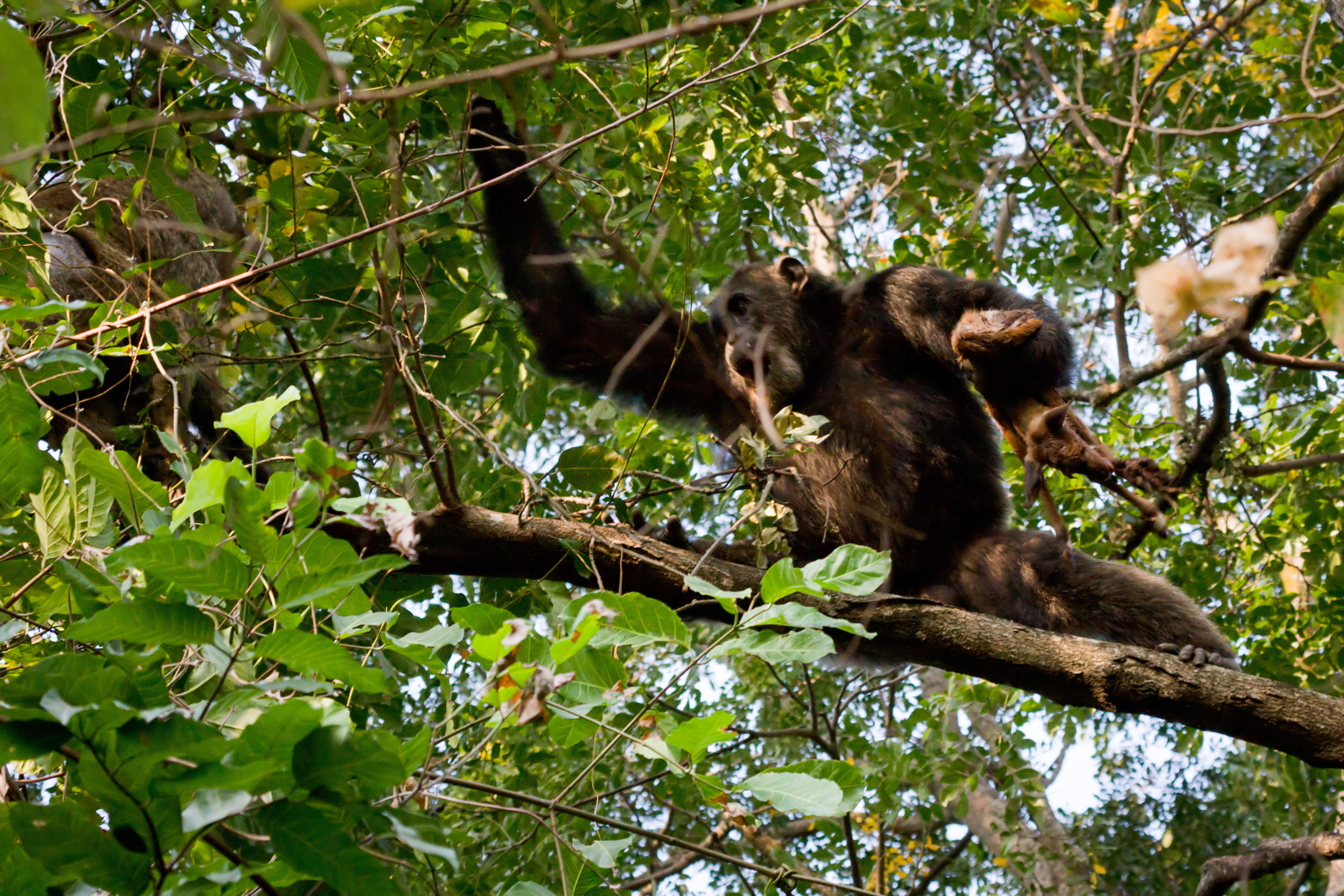
Male chimpanzee with his prey, a bushbuck

Chimpanzees are omnivorous and eat seeds, fruits, honey, leaves, bark, fungi, insects such as termites, ants and small prey such as birds and monkeys. They often use a twig as a tool to reach termites or ants in nests and have been seen using sticks to hunt other small mammals. There are also instances of organized hunting. In some cases, such as the killing of leopard cubs, this primarily seems to be a protective effort, since the leopard is the main natural predator of the common chimpanzee. Isolated cases of cannibalism have also been documented.

== Predation ==
Suspected or confirmed predators of eastern chimpanzees in Tanzania include boomslangs and black-necked spitting cobras.

== See also ==
- Bili ape
- Chimp Haven
- Great ape personhood
- Ngamba Island Chimpanzee Sanctuary
- Theory of mind
- The Third Chimpanzee
