= Kyle Pontifex =

New Zealand field hockey player

Personal information
- Full name: Kyle Marshall Pontifex
- Born: 5 February 1980 (age 46) Wellington, New Zealand
Medal record
Men's field hockey
Representing New Zealand
Oceania Cup
Silver medal – second place	2015 Stratford	Team
Commonwealth Games
Bronze medal – third place	2010 Delhi	Team
Champions Challenge
Silver medal – second place	2007 Boom	Team

Kyle Marshall Pontifex (born 5 February 1980 in Wellington) is a New Zealand professional field hockey player. He plays as a goalkeeper. He earned his first cap for the New Zealand national team, nicknamed The Black Sticks, in 2001 against Malaysia.

Pontifex represented his country in three consecutive Summer Olympics: in 2004 (Athens), 2008 (Beijing) and 2012 (London). He was a batonbearer for the 2022 Commonwealth Games Queen's Baton Relay when the baton came to Basin Reserve in March 2022.

== International senior tournaments ==
- 2003 – Sultan Azlan Shah Cup
- 2003 – Champions Challenge
- 2004 – Olympic Qualifying Tournament
- 2004 – Summer Olympics
- 2004 – Champions Trophy
- 2005 – Sultan Azlan Shah Cup
- 2006 – Commonwealth Games
- 2006 – World Cup
- 2007 – Champions Challenge
- 2008 – Olympic Games
- 2012 – Olympic Games
