= Ngamba Island Chimpanzee Sanctuary =

Chimpanzee sanctuary in Uganda

- Ngamba Island
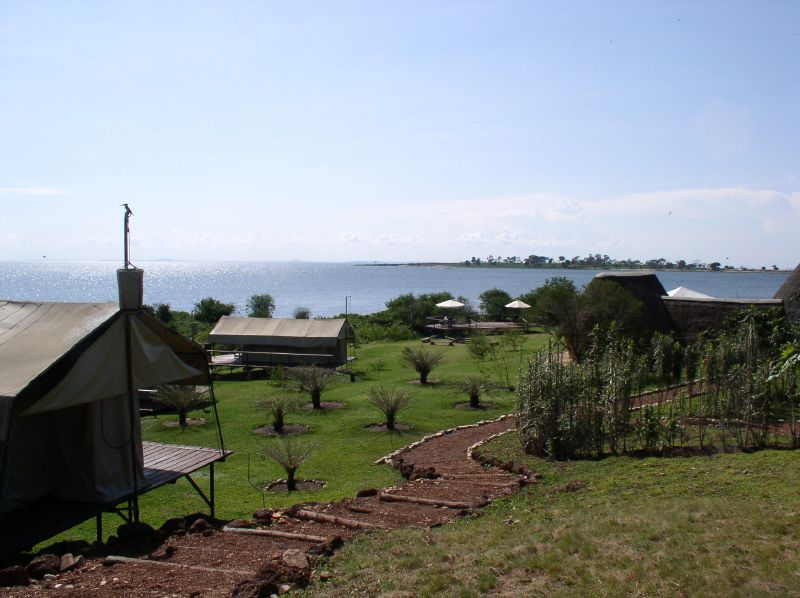
- Interactive map of Ngamba Island Chimpanzee Sanctuary
- Nearest city: Mukono
- Coordinates: 00°06′15″S 32°39′11″E
- Governing body: Chimpanzee Sanctuary and Wildlife Conservation Trust (CSWCT)

Ngamba Island Chimpanzee Sanctuary is an island sanctuary in Uganda, dedicated to the care of orphaned eastern chimpanzees that have been rescued by the Uganda Wildlife Authority. Many of the chimpanzees were rescued from poachers and would be unlikely to survive reintroduction to the wild. The sanctuary is accredited by the Global Federation of Animal Sanctuaries.

== Location ==
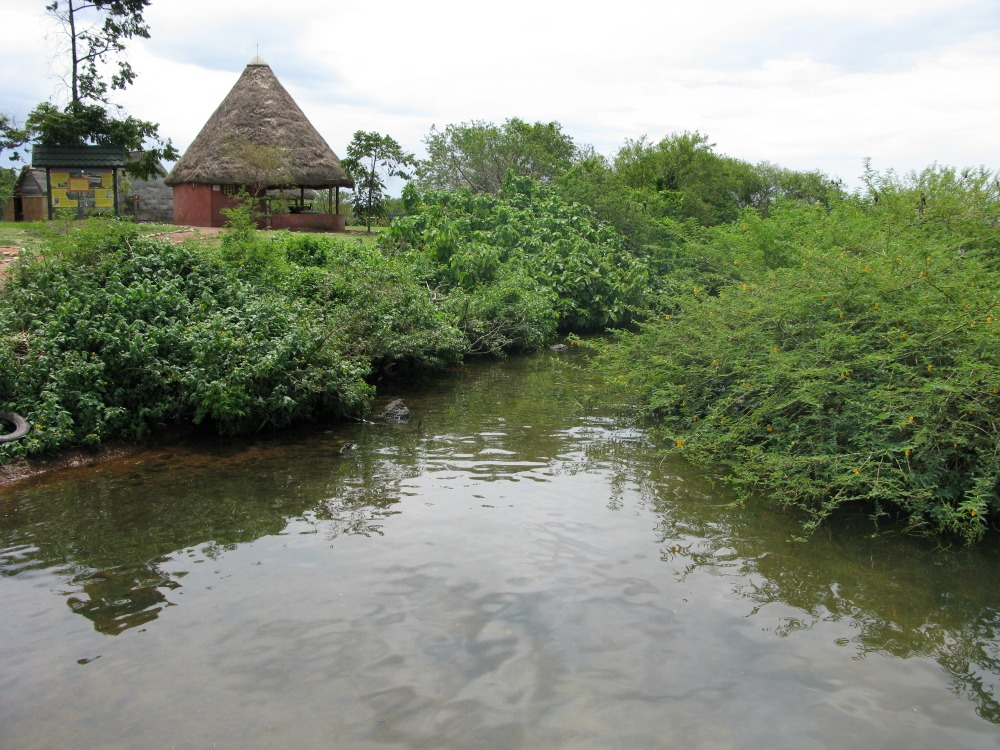
Ngamba Island Chimpanzee Sanctuary

Ngamba Island is 100 acres (40 ha) of rainforest situated on Lake Victoria, approximately 23 kilometres (14 mi), by boat south-east of the city of Entebbe, near the Equator in Lake Victoria, Uganda. The island supports a rich diversity of natural wildlife and provides a variety of natural foods for the chimpanzees. It is set up as an eco-friendly project with compost toilets, rainwater collection, proper waste management practices and solar energy for electricity and hot water.

== Overview ==
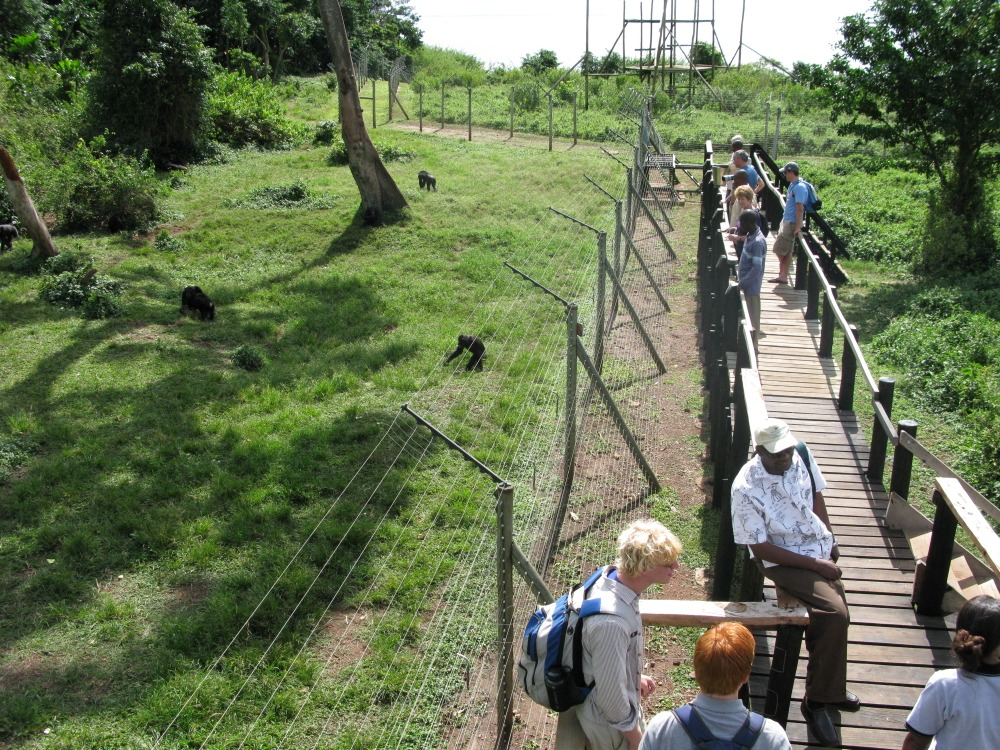
Ngamba Island Chimpanzee Sanctuary

The sanctuary is managed by a non-profit organisation, the Chimpanzee Sanctuary and Wildlife Conservation Trust (CSWCT). CSWCT is a partnership of six organizations committed to the welfare and conservation of wildlife. Its trustees are:

- Born Free Foundation
- International Fund for Animal Welfare
- Jane Goodall Institute
- Uganda Wildlife Conservation Education Centre (UWEC)
- Environmental Conservation Trust of Uganda (ECOTRUST)
- Uganda Wildlife Society

The sanctuary is accredited by the Global Federation of Animal Sanctuaries.

The sanctuary is open year-round to visitors who pay a nominal entrance fee to view one or both of the chimpanzee feedings. Day and overnight visits are booked through Wild Frontiers Uganda.

== History ==
Ngamba Island was gazetted in October 1998 to care for orphaned chimpanzees rescued from various parts of East Africa.

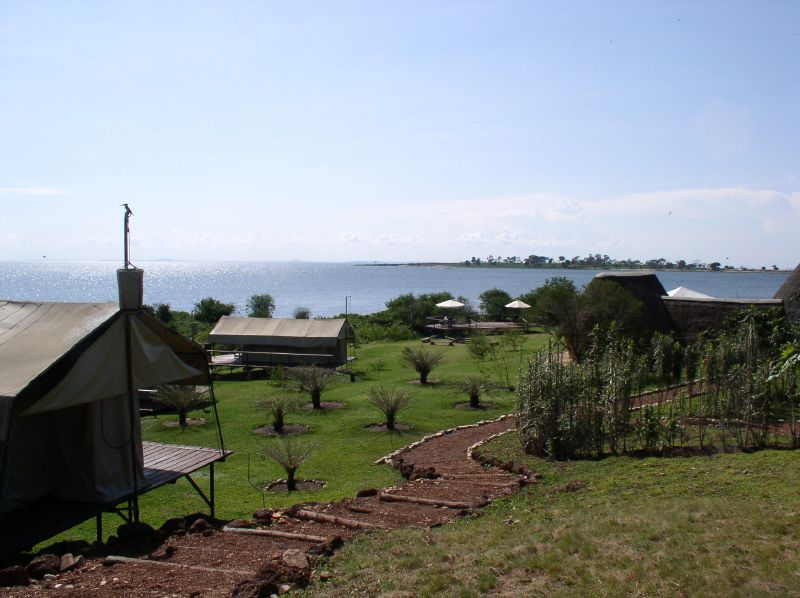
Ngamba Island Chimpanzee Sanctuary camp
