= Kusaka =

Kusaka (written: 日下, 草鹿 or 草下) is a Japanese surname. Notable people with the surname include:

- Chihiro Kusaka (日下 ちひろ) (born 1978), Japanese voice actress
- Hidenori Kusaka (日下 秀憲), Japanese manga artist
- Jinichi Kusaka (草鹿 任一) (1888–1972), Imperial Japanese Navy admiral
- Maryanne Kusaka (born 1935), American politician
- Ryūnosuke Kusaka (草鹿 龍之介) (1893–1971), Imperial Japanese Navy admiral
- Takeshi Kusaka (日下 武史) (born 1931), Japanese actor and voice actor
- Hideaki Kusaka (草下 英明) (1924–1991), Japanese science journalist

== See also ==
- Kusaka Station (日下駅, Kusaka-eki), train station in Hidaka, Takaoka District, Kōchi Prefecture, Japan
- 7421 Kusaka, main-belt asteroid, named after Hideaki Kusaka
