= Murchison Semliki Landscape =

The Murchison Semliki Landscape is a conservation priority landscape situated east of Lake Albert in western Uganda. Species of conservation concern are chimpanzee, elephant, crowned eagle, golden cat, Nahan's francolin, Nile crocodile, hippopotamus and lion. Conservation challenges in this region are pressure from the growing population on its natural resources, including immigration from within Uganda and DRC in response to the availability of natural resources, lack of law enforcement, and the prospect of employment in the establishing petroleum industry.

== Geographical location ==
The Murchison Semliki Landscape extends from Murchison Falls National Park at the northern end of Lake Albert to the Toro-Semliki Wildlife Reserve at the southern end of the lake and covers the districts of Masindi, Buliisa, Hoima, Kibaale, Kyenjojo and Ntoroko.

== Physiogeography ==
Elevation in the landscape ranges between 750–1100 m with isolated hills reaching up to 1452 m. Most of the landscape is characterized by gently rolling hills with several isolated steep sloped hill formations.

The landscape experiences a tropical wet and dry or savanna climate (Aw) according to the Köppen climate classification with a mean annual rainfall between 1350 and 1600 mm distributed over two distinct rainy seasons from April to May (short rains) and from October to December (long rains) and mean annual temperature of around 25 degree Celsius.

== Vegetation formations ==
The natural vegetation formations occurring in the landscape form a mosaic of rain forest, woodland, bushland and grassland with gallery forest along streams and rivers and papyrus swamps in flat valley bottoms.

The natural formations have been converted to other land uses for agriculture through traditionally slash and burning forest for subsistence farming and cash crop production, plantations for tea and sugar, on a large scale, and tobacco, on a smaller scale.

== Flora and species composition ==
The flora of the landscape is part of the Lake Victoria Regional Mosaic according to White's vegetation classification of Africa and it has the strongest affinity with the Guineo-Congolian and Afromontane floras, because of its close vicinity to the Congo Basin and the Rwenzori Mountains.
