= Reunification Monument =

Cameroonian historical monument

Coordinates: 3°51′09″N 11°30′48″E

Cameroon's Reunification Monument was constructed in the 1970s to memorialise the post-colonial merging of British and French Cameroon. Located in the capital of Yaoundé, its architects are Gédéon Mpando and Engelbert Mveng.

Another reunification monument, albeit far less well-known, is located in Mamfe.

Reunification monument in Buea, Front

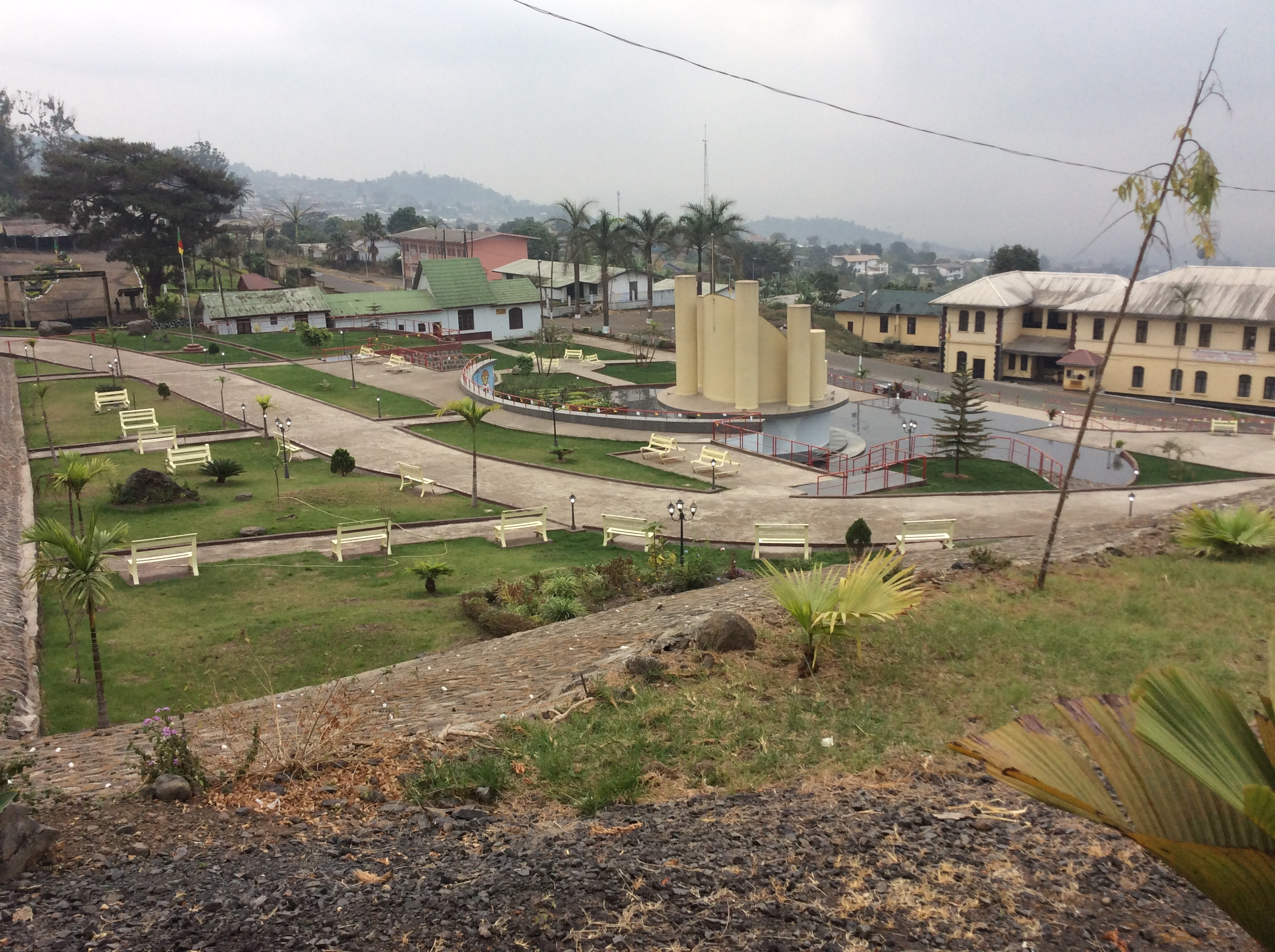
Reunification monument in Buea, Back
