= Kayabwe =

Town in Uganda

- Map of Uganda showing the location of Kayabwe
- Coordinates: 00°00′02″S 32°02′22″E
- Country: Uganda
- Region: Central Region of Uganda
- District: Mpigi District
- Elevation: 1,172 m (3,845 ft)
- Time zone: UTC+3 (EAT)

Kayabwe, is a town in the Buganda Region of Uganda. It is an urban center in Mpigi District Local Government. The town is near Swamp of River Katonga; Highway from Mombasa to Bujumbura (1500km, 25 hour drive); River Katonga; Equator line that crosses 13 countries and brings tropical climate to 100 countries; Waterfront of Lake Victoria (harbour at Namirembe landing site); Design Centre called Uganda Martyrs' University - Nkozi. The town sits astride The Equator.

== Location ==
The town is located in Mpigi District, in the Central Region of Uganda, approximately 43.5 kilometres (27 mi), by road, south-west of the town Mpigi, the location of the district headquarters. This location is along the Kampala–Masaka Road, about 81 kilometres (50 mi), by road, south-west of Kampala, the capital city of Uganda. From the city of Masaka, Kayabwe is approximately 51 kilometres (32 mi), by road, in a north-easterly direction.

The town lies at an average elevation of 1,172 metres (3,845 ft), above sea level. The geographical coordinates of Kayabwe are 0°00'02.0"S, 32°02'22.0"E (-0.000556, 32.039444).

== Points of interest ==
The Kampala-Masaka Highway, passes through Kayabwe in a general northeast to southwest direction. The Equator passes through the middle of town in a west to east direction, as can be deduced from the town's geographical coordinates.

The town is a favorite tourist stopping point. Many stop to take photographs of the Equator Monument, eat at the restaurants located there and/or buy African crafts at the nearby crafts shops. There are plans by the Uganda Tourism Board and Mpigi District Administration, to develop and modernise the location and attract more tourists.

Kayabwe has access to potable piped water supply, following improvements between 2011 and 2017, funded with loans from the African Development Bank.

Banking services are offered by Centenary Bank, a large retail commercial bank that maintains a branch in town.

== See also ==
- List of cities and towns in Uganda
