= KaMaxaquene =

- Bairro
- Country: Mozambique
- Time zone: UTC+2 (CAT)

KaMaxaquene (a.k.a. KaMaxakeni) is a bairro in Maputo, Mozambique.
