= Jabi Lake =

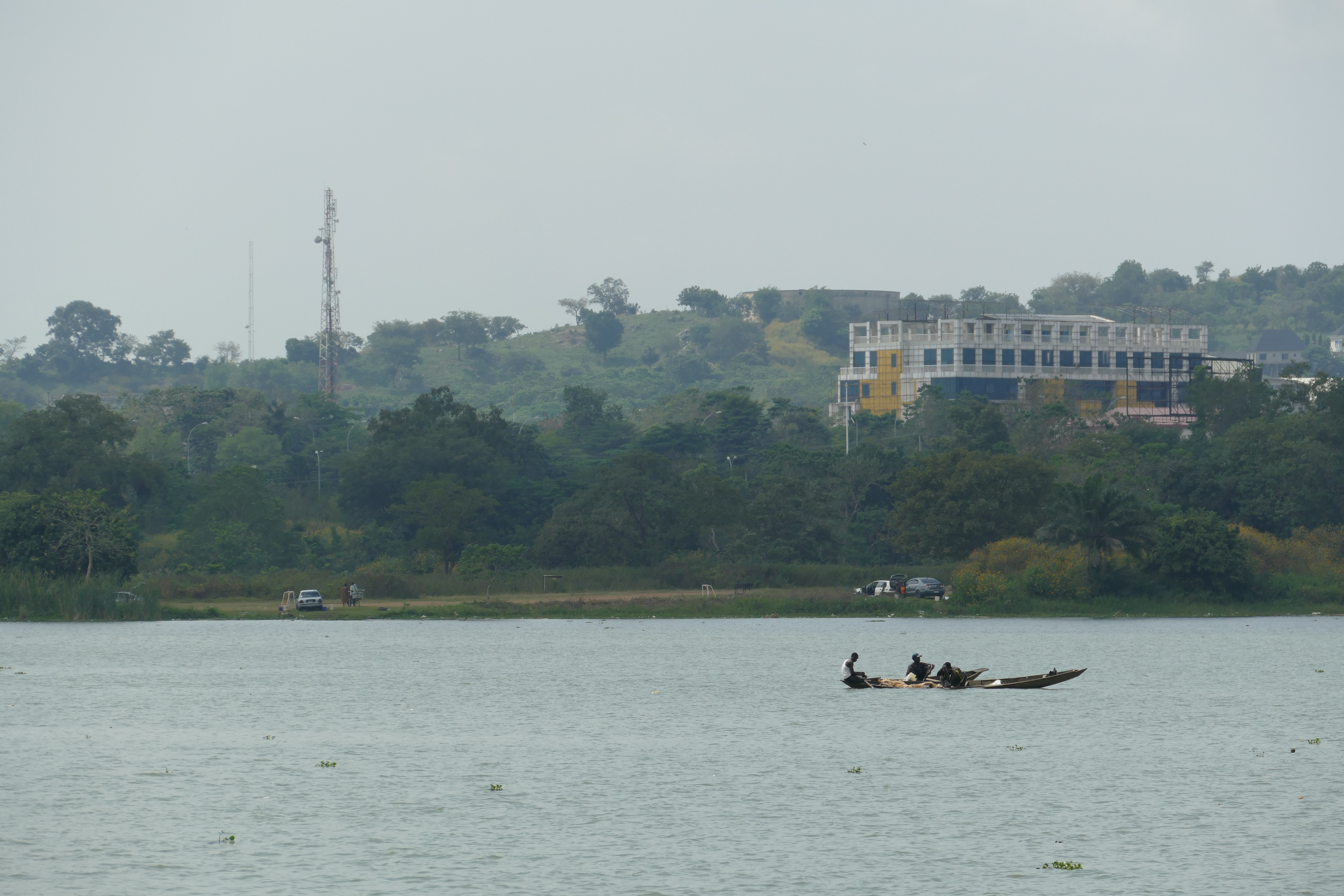

- Location within Nigeria
- Location: Nigeria
- Coordinates: 9.074°N 7.421°E
- Type: reservoir
- Surface area: 1,300 hectares (3,200 acres)

Jabi Lake is a water body formed from a man-made earth dam that was initially created to provide water to the residents of Abuja, Nigeria. The total surface area of the lake is about 1,300 hectares (3,200 acres).

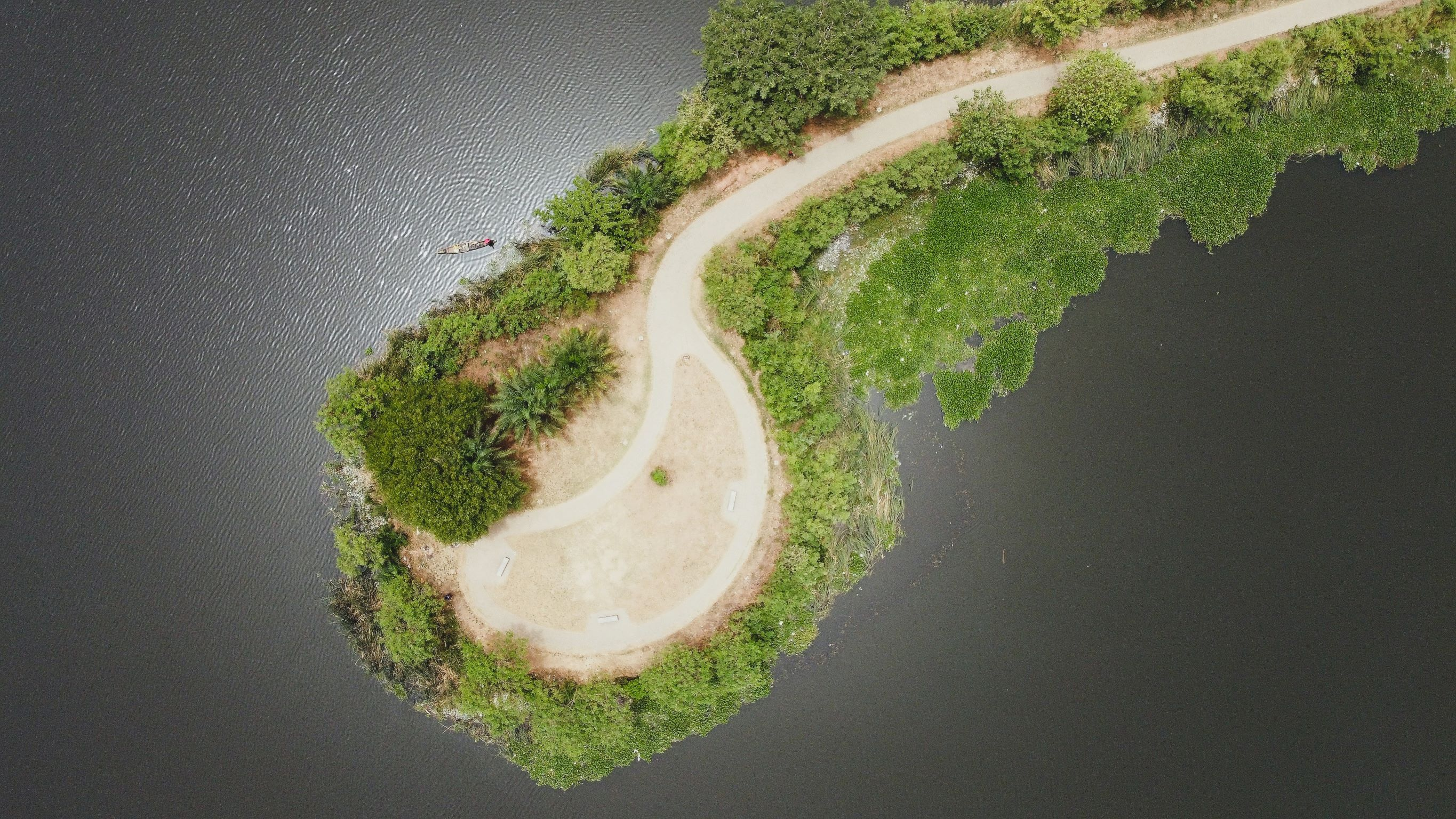
An aerial view of Jabi Lake Abuja Nigeria

The initial capacity of the reservoir was to supply water to 100,000 residents. But after the construction of the bigger Lower Usuma Dam, the reservoir became a fishing and tourism attraction.

== Locality ==
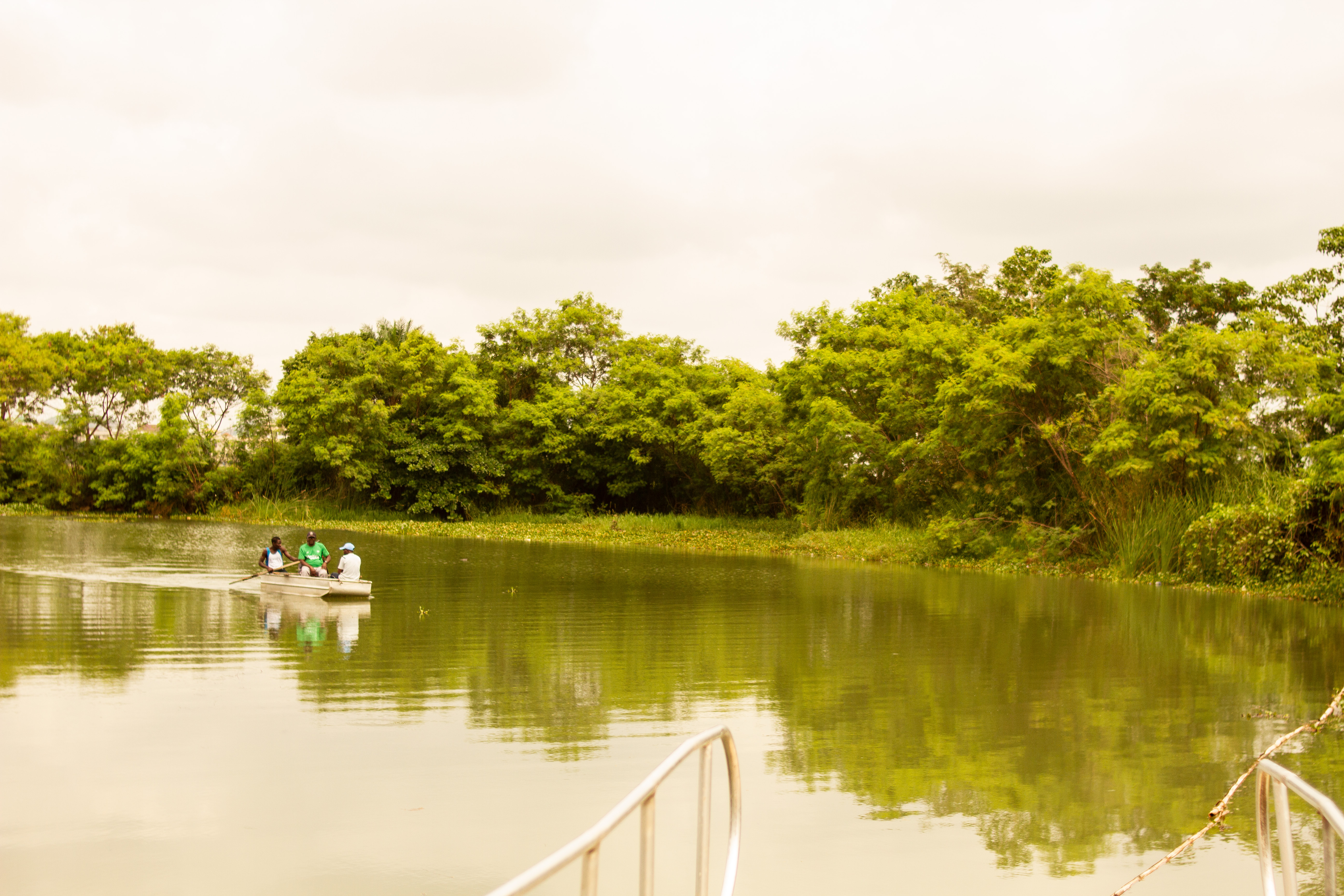
Jabi Lake

The environs of the lake has seen steady growth in land use starting in the late 1980s. In 2007, an area surrounding the lake was named Jabi Lake Park and is planned to include a resort. Social events are held within the park and the lake provides activities for fun seekers such as boat rides.
