= Uganda Wildlife Conservation Education Centre =

Wildlife preserve in Uganda

Coordinates: 0°03′10″N 32°28′35″E

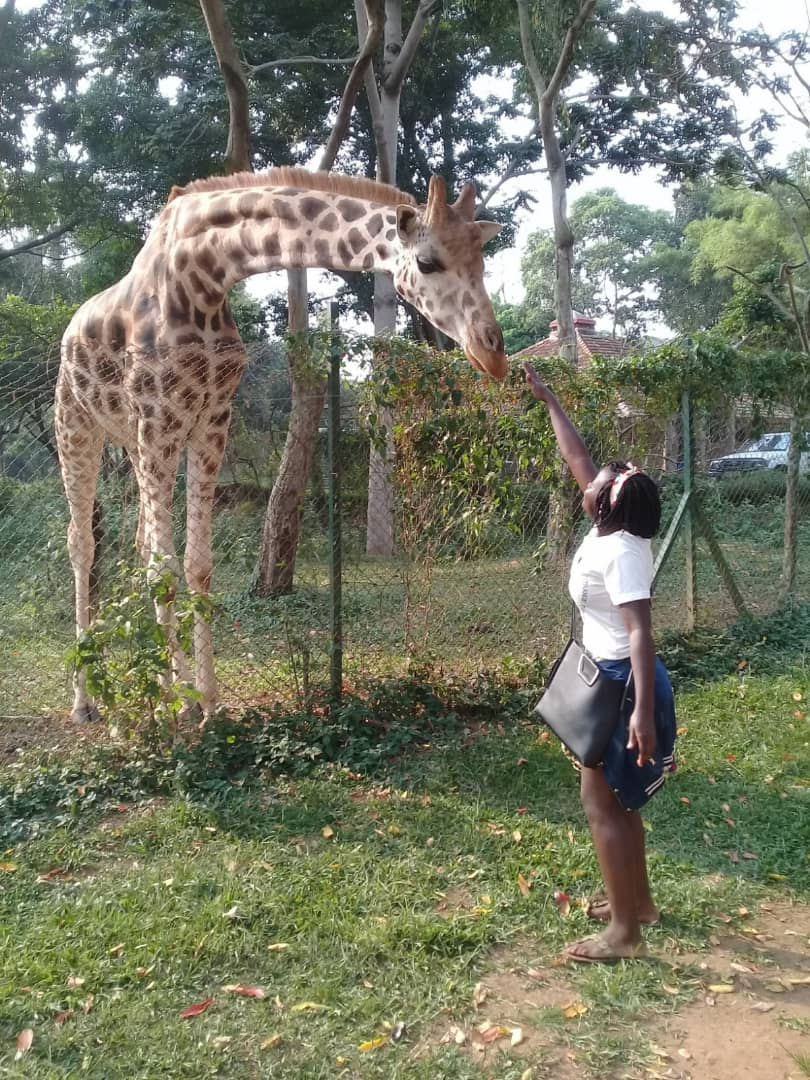

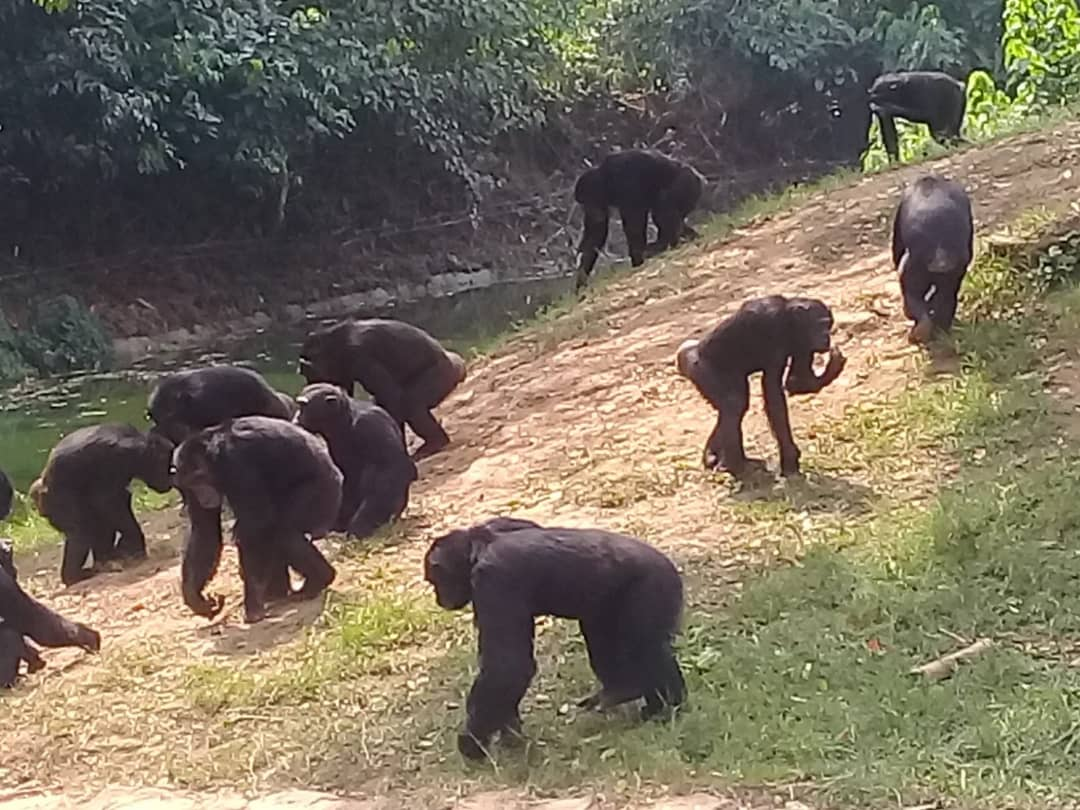
Chimpanzee meeting

The Uganda Wildlife Conservation Education Center (UWEC), popularly known as Entebbe Zoo, is a conservation education center for animals in Uganda.

== History ==
This area opened its doors in 1952 as a reception center for wild animals that were found as casualties, either injured, orphaned, sick, or confiscated from the illegal trade.

In the 1960s it changed its role into a zoo, and non-indigenous species like bears and tigers were introduced and kept as an attraction.

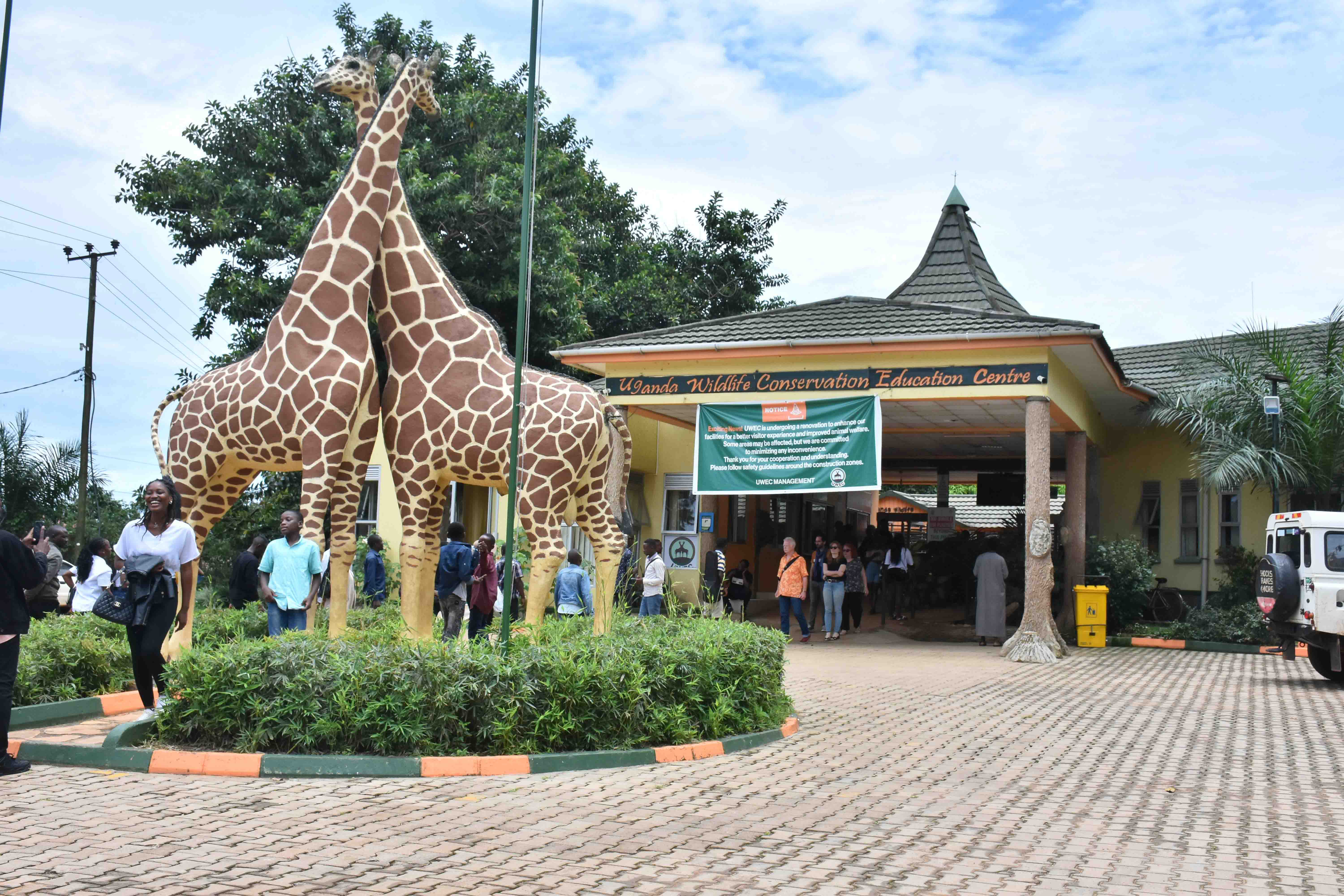
Uganda Wildlife Conservation Education Centre

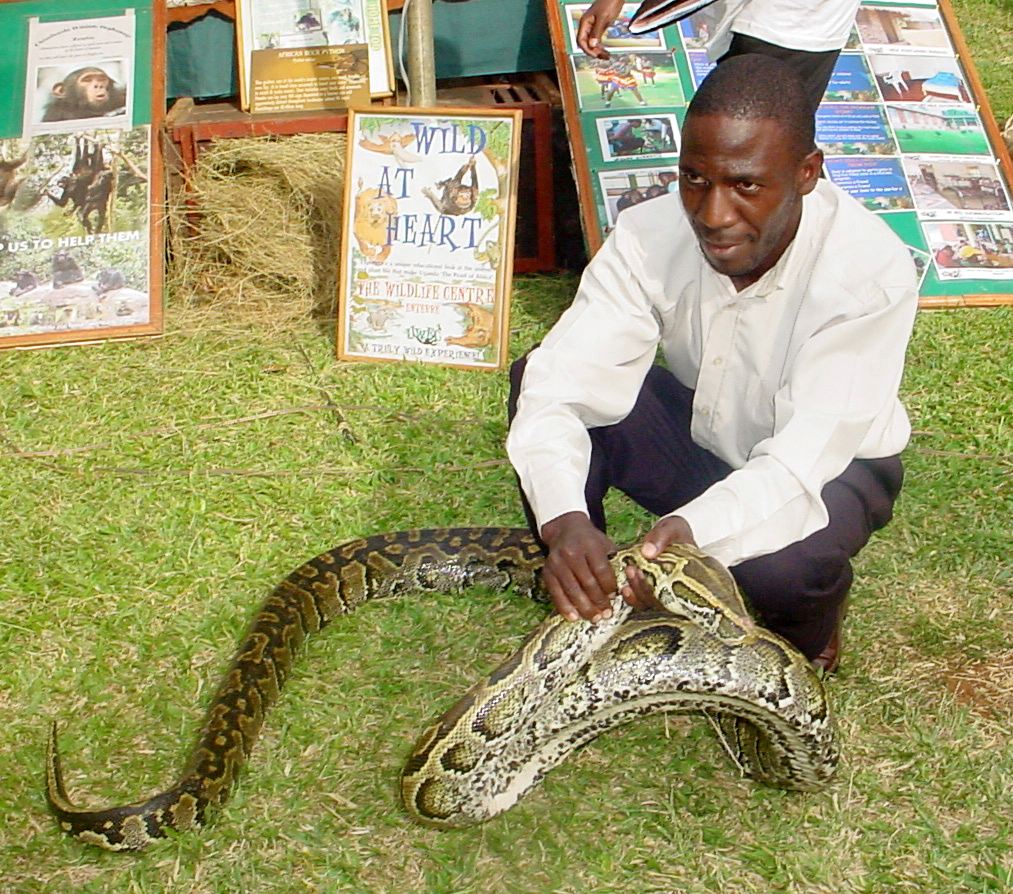
Python

In 1994, wildlife management was restructured and the zoo turned into Uganda Wildlife Education Center trust. The aim was to develop the zoo with an emphasis on conservation education.

The center includes free ranging and caged animals, birds, and several species of trees and shrubs.

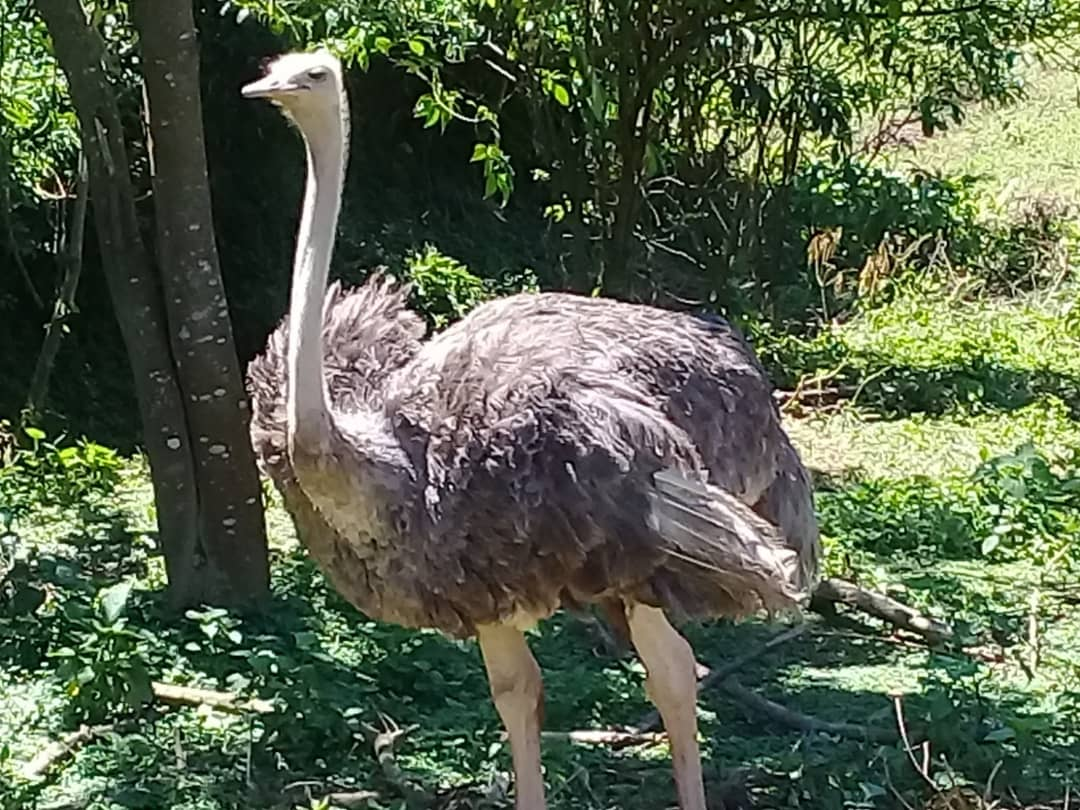
Ostrich at Uganda Wildlife Conservation Centre

Animals in the park include the rock python, cheetah, leopard, lion, tortoise, giraffe, chimpanzee, elephant, rhinoceros, ostrich and shoebill stork.

== Functions ==
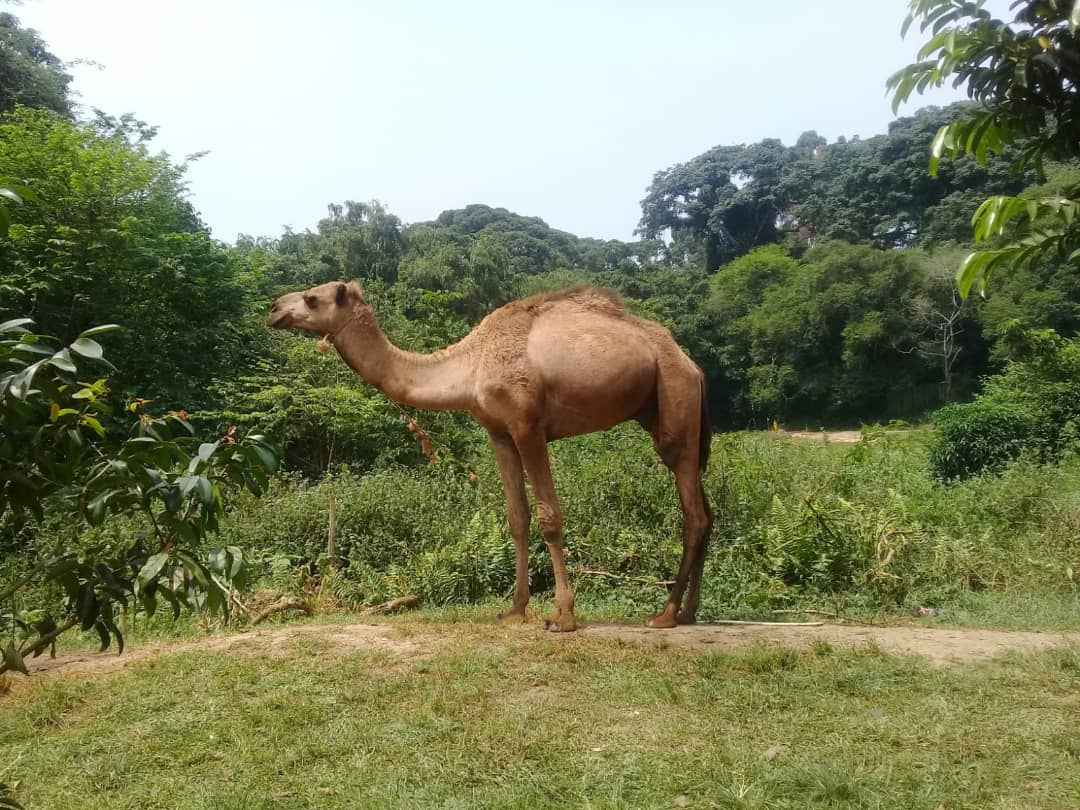
Camel in Uganda Wildlife Conservation Centre

The center functions as a conservation education center, rehabilitation center and recreation center where people come to see a variety of wild animals. The center contributes to scientific research and is committed to developing education programmes for the general public with emphasis on instilling a conservation ethic.

== Location ==
The center is located on plot 56/57 Lugard Avenue, Entebbe town, Wakiso District on the shores of Lake Victoria.
