= Battle of Simba Hills =

Battle fought in February 1979 during the Uganda-Tanzania War

- Part of the Uganda–Tanzania War
Date	February 1979
Location	near Kakuuto, Uganda
Result	Tanzanian victory

Belligerents
Tanzania	Uganda

Commanders and leaders
David Musuguri; John Butler Walden	Unknown

Units involved
201st Brigade; 207th Brigade; 208th Brigade; TPDF Air Wing	1st Infantry Battalion; Uganda Army Air Force

Strength
3 brigades	Unknown

Casualties and losses
2 killed 200 sick	34–200 killed 19 aircraft destroyed 6 tanks captured

The Battle of Simba Hills or Battle of Kakuuto (Kiswahili: Mapigano ya Kakuuto) was a conflict of the Uganda–Tanzania War that took place over several days in mid-February 1979 around the Simba Hills in southern Uganda, near the town of Kakuuto. Tanzanian troops advanced over the Ugandan border and assaulted the Ugandans' positions, forcing them to retreat.

Colonel Idi Amin had seized power in a military coup in Uganda in 1971 and established a brutal dictatorship. Seven years later he attempted to invade Tanzania to the south. Ugandan troops occupied the Kagera Salient and subsequently murdered local civilians and destroyed property. The attack was eventually repulsed, and Tanzanian President Julius Nyerere, unsatisfied with Amin's refusal to renounce his claims to Tanzanian territory and the international community's failure to strongly condemn the invasion, ordered his forces to advance into southern Uganda with the aim of capturing the towns of Masaka and Mbarara.

Between Masaka and the Tanzanian border was the Lukoma air strip, a military installation which was overlooked by several hills: Nsambya Hill, Kikanda Hill, and the Simba Hills. Each hill was occupied by Ugandan troops. Three Tanzanian brigades were allocated for the advance to Masaka. In mid-February the Tanzanian 207th Brigade penetrated deep swampland to attack Ugandan forces at Katera, driving them away with artillery fire and thus securing the advance of the 201st and 208th Brigades to the Simba Hills. They attacked on 11 February, causing most Ugandan troops to flee. Ugandan aircraft vainly attempted to stop the Tanzanian advance, suffering heavy losses. Lukoma air strip and the surrounding hills fell on 13 February. The Tanzanians were able to successfully attack and seize Masaka eleven days later.

== Background ==
In 1971 Colonel Idi Amin launched a military coup that overthrew the President of Uganda, Milton Obote, precipitating a deterioration of relations with the neighbouring Tanzania. Amin installed himself as President and ruled the country under a repressive dictatorship. In October 1978 he launched an invasion of Tanzania. On 1 November he announced the annexation of the Kagera Salient, a 1,800 square kilometre (700 square mile) strip of land between the Ugandan border and the Kagera River. The Uganda Army subsequently pillaged the area it occupied, murdering civilians, stealing cattle, and destroying property, triggering the flight of 40,000 inhabitants southward. Tanzania eventually halted the assault, mobilised anti-Amin opposition groups, and launched a counter-offensive, expelling the Ugandans from its territory. On 22 January 1979 the Tanzania People's Defence Force (TPDF) seized the Ugandan border town of Mutukula to counter any further threats to Kagera. The Tanzanians then constructed an air strip in the locale so transport aircraft could resupply the troops at the front lines.

Though many international actors were sympathetic with the Tanzanian position, numerous African states and the Organisation of African Unity (OAU) strongly encouraged Tanzanian President Julius Nyerere to exercise restraint and not act beyond defending his territory. He had originally not intended to expand the war, but with Amin refusing to renounce his claims to Tanzanian territory and the OAU's criticism of the Kagera invasion being muted, he decided that Tanzanian forces should occupy southern Uganda—specifically the two major towns of Masaka and Mbarara.

== Prelude ==
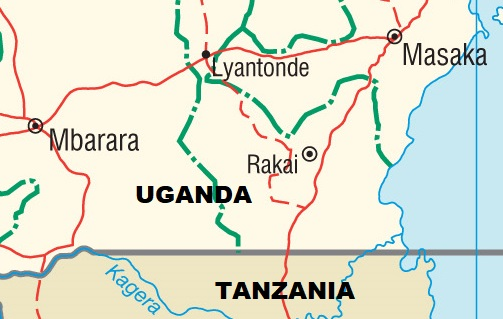
Map of southeastern Uganda showing Masaka and Mbarara

The Tanzanians began careful planning for an offensive on the two towns. Major General David Musuguri was appointed commander of the TPDF's 20th Division and tasked with overseeing the advance into Uganda. Along the approach to Masaka was the Lukoma air strip, a military installation which was overlooked by several hills: Nsambya Hill, Kikanda Hill, and the Simba Hills. These were near the town of Kakuuto. Each hill was occupied by Ugandan troops, which were equipped with tanks and artillery. According to American intelligence analyst Kenneth M. Pollack, these were key defensive positions for Uganda. Tanzanian patrols detected the Ugandan presence in the hills. Despite holding the high ground, Ugandan commanders apparently did not know how to use their positions to their advantage; only a single trench was present on Nsambya Hill. The Ugandans placed their artillery behind Kikanda Hill.

The TPDF plan allocated three brigades to the advance to Masaka: the 201st, the 207th, and the 208th. Originally, it called for the 207th Brigade to attack the Simba Hills from the east while the other two units would assault them from the south-west. More comprehensive intelligence reports informed the Tanzanians that 500 Ugandan soldiers, equipped with armoured personnel carriers and tanks, were garrisoning Katera, which was located along a peninsula in Sango Bay. Placed on a hill, Katera overlooked the road to Kasensero, and the trading center of Kyebe. Since proceeding with the original offensive would allow these troops to flank the TPDF, Musuguri ordered the 207th Brigade to secure Katera before the rest of the attack proceeded.

== Battle ==
=== Attack on Katera ===
Map of Uganda showing important locations of the battle

The TPDF began its advance in mid February. The 207th Brigade moved out from Minziro, Tanzania. There were two routes from Minziro to Katera: the first was a road that went directly to the locale, the second was a narrow trail that meandered through swampland. Fearing that the first way was predictable and would expose his troops to Ugandan tank fire, Brigadier John Butler Walden ordered his unit to travel down the footpath. A handful of soldiers who had grown up in the lakeside villages near Bukoba and thus cognizant of local language and culture were recruited as advance scouts. Equipped with normal clothing and rare goods to win favour with the locals, they moved out to gather information on the path's condition. The scouting party returned the next day, its members exhausted and ill. They reported that the trail had been flooded by heavy rains and was rendered impassable. Walden nevertheless decided that the trail was still the best option for the advance, and ordered the 207th Brigade to proceed. Many heavy weapons—too cumbersome for transport down the path—were left behind by the Tanzanians in Minziro.

Walden set out with his troops on the eight kilometre trek from Minziro to his first objective, Bulembe Hill, which was in Tanzania. The trek lasted 10 and a half hours, longer than was expected, and involved the brigade dealing with mosquitoes and tsetse flies and wading through shoulder-deep water. The unit briefly rested atop Bulembe Hill before departing north for Katera, which was 28 kilometres away. The 207th Brigade traveled through Sango Bay swamps for 50 hours in deep water. Despite supplies being carried on the soldiers' heads, the wet conditions ruined their ammunition and rations and temporarily disabled radios. The local TPDF headquarters lost contact with the unit, and feared that it had been ambushed and destroyed. The 207th Brigade exited the swamp on the third day near Katera and was able to re-establish radio contact with its headquarters. Though no Tanzanian soldiers had died during the trek, 200 fell ill and were evacuated via helicopter. Since the men of the 207th Brigade were exhausted, Tanzanian commanders postponed their attack on Katera until dawn. Instead, they bombarded the peninsula with BM-21 Grad multiple rocket launchers over the night. The following morning the 207th Brigade advanced into the area, finding that the Ugandan forces had retreated. Some withdrew to the Simba Hills. Intercepts of Ugandan radio communications indicated that 43 soldiers were killed in the bombardment.

=== Attack on Nsambya Hill, Kikanda Hill, and Simba Hills ===
Once the Tanzanians had secured Katera, the TPDF's 201st and 208th Brigades began advancing towards the Simba Hills. The capture of Katera made the Uganda Army aware of a Tanzanian offensive, but it could not determine the precise direction or timing of the next assault. The night before the attack on the Simba Hills, several Tanzanian brigadiers assembled for a final meeting and began drinking alcohol. After becoming intoxicated, they decided they should trick Ugandan forces into thinking they were facing foreign troops. Once reunited with their units, the brigadiers broadcast over the radio—which they knew was monitored by the Ugandans—that "the Cubans", "the Israelis" and "the Americans" were in position to attack. Immediately thereafter Ugandan troops began withdrawing en masse from the area. On 11 February the TPDF assaulted the hills, reinforced by the 207th Brigade coming from the east. Amin announced over Radio Uganda that Cuban, Israeli, and American troops were being used against him. At the hills, the Ugandan troops were routed and devastated by artillery strikes; only those that felt trapped—particularly the 1st Infantry Battalion—offered substantial resistance. In contrast to the relatively light resistance offered by Ugandan ground forces, the Uganda Army Air Force repeatedly launched bombing raids against the Tanzanians at Simba Hills, at one point forcing some Tanzanian troops to scatter. The TPDF's SA-7 man-portable air-defense system teams responded, and later claimed to have shot down 19 Ugandan aircraft. The Tanzanian Air Wing also bombed Ugandan positions during the battle.

In an effort to expedite their progress while under the threat of air attack, Tanzanian troops deployed missile launchers and fired them on Ugandan positions, overwhelming the defenders. Detachments from the 201st and 208th Brigades assumed positions north of the hills, cutting off the Ugandans' retreat. The TPDF finally secured the hills and the Lukoma air strip on 13 February. According to American journalists Tony Avirgan and Martha Honey, between 100 and 200 Ugandan soldiers were killed in battle. According to Tanzanian journalist Baldwin Mzirai, 34 Ugandan soldiers were killed at the hills. Two Tanzanians also died in the fighting. The Tanzanians seized six medium tanks and captured or destroyed several armoured personnel carriers and artillery pieces during the fighting.

== Aftermath ==
Amin's claim that Cuban, Israeli, and American troops were being used against him was dismissed by the international community. Musuguri was nevertheless displeased by his brigadiers' ruse that had tricked the Ugandans, and issued them a formal reprimand. For its long trek through the swamp during the battle, the TPDF's 207th Brigade was dubbed "the Amphibious Brigade" by Tanzanian soldiers. A detachment of the 207th Brigade, at least 100–200 soldiers strong, garrisoned Katera for the rest of the war. Two Ugandan MiG-21s attacked the Lukoma air strip on 14 February in an attempt to destroy Tanzanian transport aircraft. The raid was easily repelled by the TPDF, as Tanzanian MiGs and ground forces responded and forced the jets to flee. On 24 February the 201st, 207th, and 208th Brigades attacked and seized Masaka.

Nyerere originally planned to halt his forces in Masaka and allow the Ugandan rebels to attack Kampala and overthrow Amin, as he feared that scenes of Tanzanian troops occupying the city would reflect poorly on his country's image abroad. However, Ugandan rebel forces did not have the strength to defeat the incoming Libyan units, so Nyerere decided to use the TPDF to take Kampala. Kampala was secured by the TPDF on 11 April. Combat operations in the country continued until 3 June, when Tanzanian forces reached the Sudanese border and eliminated the last resistance. The TPDF withdrew from Uganda in 1981.
