= Robinah =

Robinah can be both a feminine given name and a middle name. Notable people with the name include:

- Robinah Nabbanja (born 1969), prime minister of Uganda
- Robinah Nansubuga (born 1986), Ugandan art curator and filmmaker
- Sanyu Robinah Mweruka, Ugandan news anchor
