= General Walden =

General Walden may refer to:

- Hiram Walden (1800–1880), New York State Militia major general
- John Butler Walden (1939–2002), Tanzanian People's Defence Force major general
- Rudolf Walden (1878–1946), Finnish general
