= Hamda Taryam Al Shamsi =

Emirati drag racing driver (1999/2000–2024)

- Born: 2000
- Died: 27 January 2024 (aged 24); Abu Dhabi, United Arab Emirates
- Other name: Hamda Taryam
- Occupations: Businesswoman, philanthropist
- Years active: 2020–2024
- Known for: Drag racing, philanthropy
- Notable work: Hamda Foundation for Charitable Investments in Uganda

Hamda Taryam Al Shamsi (2000 – 27 January 2024) was an Emirati professional drag racer, philanthropist and businesswoman. Hamda was known for philanthropic efforts, particularly in African nations, including Uganda. She was a founder of Hamda Vocational and Social Institute, and Hamda Foundation for charitable projects. She is a professional motorcycle driver and racer, Hamda Mattar was the first Emirati car racer, as she began her journey in the racing world in 2020 because of her dedicated father, after she turned 18.

== Career ==
Hamda Taryam was starting her career and known for her skills in car and motorcycle racing, becoming the first Emirati female car racer. Her journey in the automotive world began in 2020. She shared her passion for racing on her Instagram account, where she had amassed a following of 136,000 followers.

== Notable works and philanthropy ==
Hamda Taryam was a well-known philanthropist in Uganda who initiated various charitable projects through her foundation, the Hamda Foundation for Charitable Investments. In March 2022, at the Emirates Custom Show exhibition, a new project for a vocational institute in Uganda's Maska region was announced, called the Hamda Vocational and Social Institute, to support Ugandan orphans. This institute, a continuation of the 'Taryam School' project for orphans, is part of a group of humanitarian projects previously completed by the foundation. The project for orphans provides free education to 350 male and female students at all levels.

The foundation also completed a non-profit hospital project for the city, which cost over Dh800,000. The hospital began operating on November 11, 2020, and has treated about 300,000 patients free of charge, as well as performed 5,000 births.

== Death ==
Hamda Taryam died of fatal incident at a private hospital in Abu Dhabi, on 27 January 2024, at the age of 24. His Highness Sheikh Dr. Sultan bin Muhammad Al Qasimi, Member of the Supreme Council and Ruler of Sharjah, attended her funeral service in Wasit

=== Reactions and tributes ===
Arab Emirates and Masaka Uganda) reacted to Hamda death with grief and thousands of tributes poured in through social media platforms. Thousands of people paid their respects during his funeral procession Sheikh Dr Sultan offered his condolences to the Taryam family during a visit to a mourning council in the Wasit district of Sharjah

== Media and television show ==
- Netflix Show The Fastest

Hamda Taryam gained global acclaim after she had featured in the Netflix show ‘The Fastest’, the first Arabic reality show which highlighted the region's love of motorsport.

Year	Show	Channel	Notes
2022	The Fastest	Netflix	

== See also ==
- Women in Arab societies
