= Battle of Masaka =

1979 battle of the Uganda-Tanzania War

Coordinates: 00°20′28″S 31°44′10″E

- Part of the Uganda–Tanzania War
- Battle of Masaka (Uganda)
Date	23–24 February 1979
Location	Masaka, Uganda
Result	Tanzanian-Ugandan rebel victory
Territorial changes	Masaka captured by Tanzanian and Ugandan rebel forces

Belligerents
Tanzania (Uganda) Ugandan rebels	Uganda

Commanders and leaders
(Tanzania) David Musuguri (Tanzania) John Walden	Isaac Maliyamungu; Bernard Rwehururu

Units involved
20th Division: 201st Brigade; 207th Brigade; 208th Brigade	First Infantry Brigade; Suicide Battalion; Chui Battalion

Strength
3 Tanzanian brigades 1 Ugandan rebel battalion	Unknown, possibly thousands of soldiers

The Battle of Masaka (Kiswahili: Mapigano ya Masaka) was a battle of the Uganda–Tanzania War that took place on 23 and 24 February 1979 in the town of Masaka, Uganda. Following artillery bombardment, most of the Ugandan government forces fled and Tanzanian and Ugandan rebel forces captured the town.

Colonel Idi Amin had seized power in a military coup in Uganda in 1971 and established a brutal dictatorship. Seven years later he attempted to invade Tanzania to the south. Ugandan troops occupied the Kagera Salient and subsequently murdered local civilians and destroyed property. The attack was eventually repulsed, and Tanzanian President Julius Nyerere, unsatisfied with Amin's refusal to renounce his claims to Tanzanian territory and the international community's failure to strongly condemn the invasion, ordered his forces to advance into southern Uganda with the aim of capturing the towns of Masaka and Mbarara.

After careful planning, the Tanzania People's Defence Force (TPDF) crossed the border in January 1979 and moved steadily northward. Masaka was garrisoned by several thousand Ugandan troops, including the Suicide Battalion. Their performance was undermined by low morale and internal divisions. The TPDF surrounded the town on three sides and on 23 February, after beating off several harassing Ugandan probes, initiated an artillery barrage, concentrating on the Suicide Battalion's barracks. Several Ugandan units withdrew to Lukaya, leaving the Suicide Battalion alone to defend Masaka. The TPDF's 201st and 208th Brigades attacked at dawn. A battalion of Ugandan rebels and the 207th Brigade—bolstered by a tank squadron—also moved in on the town. The Suicide Battalion withdrew towards the village of Villa Maria, and, aside from opposition at Kasijagirwa camp, the TPDF seized the town with minimal resistance. As revenge for the damage wrought by the Ugandans in Kagera, the TPDF razed much of Masaka. The loss of the town greatly hurt the morale of the Ugandan forces and troubled Ugandan commanders. Amin ordered a counter-attack which was defeated in Lukaya. His promise to exact revenge on the local civilians for welcoming the invasion partly contributed to Nyerere's decision to attack Kampala. Much of Masaka was later rebuilt.

== Background ==
In 1971 Colonel Idi Amin launched a military coup that overthrew the President of Uganda, Milton Obote, precipitating a deterioration of relations with the neighbouring state of Tanzania. Amin installed himself as president and ruled the country under a repressive dictatorship. In October 1978 he launched an invasion of Tanzania. On 1 November he announced the annexation of the Kagera Salient, an 1800 square kilometre (1118.5 square mile) strip of land between the Ugandan border and the Kagera River. Ugandan troops subsequently pillaged the area they occupied, murdering civilians, stealing cattle, and destroying property, triggering the flight of 40,000 inhabitants southward. Tanzania eventually halted the assault, mobilised anti-Amin opposition groups, and launched a counter-offensive. In January 1979 the Tanzania People's Defence Force (TPDF) seized the Ugandan border town of Mutukula to counter any further threats to Kagera. The TPDF bulldozed homes in the locale and murdered local civilians to avenge the destruction in Kagera. Deeply disturbed by the event, Nyerere subsequently instructed his troops to refrain from harming civilian life and property.

Though many international actors were sympathetic with the Tanzanian position, numerous African states and the Organisation of African Unity (OAU) strongly encouraged Tanzanian President Julius Nyerere to exercise restraint and not act beyond defending his territory. He had originally not intended to expand the war, but with Amin refusing to renounce his claims to Tanzanian territory and the OAU's criticism of the Kagera invasion being muted, he decided that Tanzanian forces should occupy southern Uganda.

== Prelude ==
The two major towns in southern Uganda were Masaka and Mbarara. The former was the third largest inhabited place in the country and the site of the southern headquarters for the Uganda Army. The Tanzanians decided to seize them as revenge for the devastation wrought by Ugandan troops in their country and in order to incite a rebellion. Obote assured Nyerere that if the locales were taken a mass uprising would take place against Amin's regime, deposing it in a few weeks and allowing the Tanzanians to exit the war. Obote was also certain (and Nyerere was partly convinced) that the Uganda Army would disintegrate if Masaka were captured. The Tanzanians began careful planning for an offensive on the two towns. Major General David Musuguri was appointed commander of the TPDF's 20th Division and tasked with overseeing the advance into Uganda. It was originally hoped that the Ugandan rebels could spearhead the attack, but there were only about 1,000 of them, so the Tanzanians had to lead the operation. Between the TPDF's positions and Masaka was a series of locations occupied by Ugandan troops that needed to be cleared out, including an airstrip and various artillery batteries. The 201st, 207th, and 208th Brigades were ordered to clear the way. They steadily advanced, killing dozens of Ugandan soldiers, destroying large amounts of their materiel, and seizing the airstrip on 13 February.

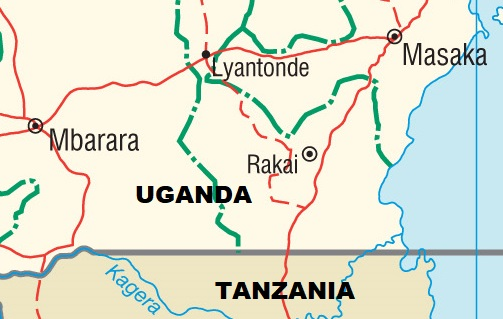
Map of southeastern Uganda showing Masaka and Mbarara

Meanwhile, Amin claimed that Tanzanian forces and mercenaries had seized a large portion of Ugandan territory. Facing questions from the international community, Tanzania insisted that its troops had only occupied land just over the Ugandan border. Tanzanian diplomats repeated Nyerere's proclamation that "Tanzania does not desire an inch of Ugandan territory" but evaded more specific questions about their troops' movements. After 24 Tanzanians were killed in an ambush at Lake Nakivale, the TPDF slowed its offensive. They dislodged the garrison of Kalisizo, a town 28 kilometres (17 mi) south of Masaka, inflicting heavy casualties. The Ugandans that retreated to Masaka were in a panicked state and demoralised the troops stationed there. Anticipating conflict, most of the civilian population, including the mayor, fled the town. The civilians mostly left out of fear of Masaka's garrison, as the Ugandan military was notorious for harassing civilians. At the recommendation of an Indian diplomat, the municipality's South Asian community evacuated.

Tanzanian commanders formulated their final plan of attack for Masaka after seizing Kiziba. The exact strength of Masaka's garrison was unknown to the Tanzanians, but it was assumed at the time to number in the thousands. The garrison was commanded by Brigadier Isaac Maliyamungu and included the Suicide Battalion, regarded as one of the best units in the Uganda Army. Nevertheless, the Ugandan military in general was lacking in discipline and was affected by internal divisions, reducing its combat effectiveness at Masaka. Lieutenant Colonel Bernard Rwehururu, the commander of the Suicide Battalion, suspected that after Kalisizo's fall Masaka would be attacked. He called a meeting with his fellow officers to discuss defensive strategy. Agreeing that the town should not be abandoned, the commanders drew up plans that called for troops to occupy specific locations. The Suicide Battalion was to defend Masaka from the Mutukula, Mbarara, and Bukakata–Nyendo roads and also guard the hill with the local television mast. Soldiers of the Chui Battalion and the First Infantry Brigade were allocated to the Kitovu and Buwala hills. According to journalist Faustin Mugabe, the Masaka garrison also included police officers who had been drafted into the Uganda Army.

== Battle ==
Following their victory at Kalisizo, the Tanzanians were in a good position to continue their advance, but instead halted and regrouped. They encircled Masaka on three sides, but were ordered not to move in, as an OAU meeting was convened in Nairobi in an attempt to provide mediation between the belligerents. Amin erroneously declared that Masaka had fallen on 22 February. Boastful Ugandan political exiles in Nairobi repeated the claim, which was subsequently reported by the international press. Nyerere was extremely displeased when he saw the false story on the front page of Tanzania's Daily News. Maliyamungu saw an opportunity for a counter-attack, so his troops launched a number of probes against the Tanzanian positions on 23 February. The TPDF easily repelled the assaults, but, to the chagrin of field commanders, was not yet allowed to attack the town. Instead they set up artillery and trained their guns on Masaka. The 201st, 205th, and 207th Brigades moved up to the outskirts of the town, while a column of rebels under Lieutenant Colonel David Oyite-Ojok advanced into the area.

[O]ur beautiful Masaka was set upon by an orgy of destruction. The Governor's building fell with the loudest bang one could ever have imagined, while the grass thatched huts and houses which had been erected for recreational purposes were set ablaze.

— Ugandan Lieutenant Colonel Bernard Rwehururu

On the eve of 24 February, the TPDF initiated a large nighttime bombardment of Masaka, focusing their fire on the Suicide Battalion's barracks. They fired nearly 1,000 shells. The town centre was also hit with Katyusha "Saba Saba" rockets. The Ugandan troops from the barracks were not in their defensive positions by the time the barrage started, and withdrew to Boma hill. Feeling that the hill positions offered them sufficient cover for an extension of their deployment, some of the soldiers relocated to a pineapple field in the Masaka valley and entrenched themselves. By then serious divisions had emerged among both the rank and file and the officers about defending the town. According to Rwehururu, many soldiers felt that the entire war had been instigated by the Suicide Battalion and thus believed that Masaka should be solely defended by that unit. The officers of Sudanese, Congolese, and West Nile extract felt that the conflict had little impact on their places of origin and were not committed to a battle. Partly as a result of the internal tensions, the First Infantry Brigade and the Chui Battalion promptly withdrew to Lukaya.

At Musuguri's direction, the TPDF's 201st and 208th Brigades attacked at dawn. Their assault focused on Kitovu (which had been left undefended by the Chui Battalion's desertion), Nyendo, and the pineapple field, before concentrating on Makasa proper. The 207th Brigade under Brigadier John Walden, equipped with a squadron of tanks, attacked from Mutukula. Outnumbered, the Suicide Battalion withdrew over a marsh to the Villa Maria road. The retreat, according to Rwehururu, devolved into a "stampede" as he "lost control" of the situation. The New York Times reporter John Darnton later argued that the Suicide Battalion had de facto "rebelled" during the battle. The Suicide Battalion eventually took up positions on Villa Maria hill, where it watched the Tanzanians enter Masaka. The TPDF seized the town with minimal difficulty, finding that most of the Ugandan soldiers and civilians had left. The few civilians that remained welcomed the Tanzanians as "liberators". The Tanzanians encountered determined resistance at Kasijagirwa camp, but were able to take it with the aid of 130 mm (5.1 in) artillery and Katyusha rockets. Amin later claimed that Palestinian guerillas aided in the defence of the town. A battalion of Ugandan rebels captured Buchulo airfield and then destroyed the Masaka Town Hall and the local police station, which were being used as armouries. The Tanzanians were "under orders" to destroy the town as revenge for the damage done by the Ugandans in Kagera and subsequently began razing structures not damaged by the bombardment. (Note: Political scientist Daniel Acheson-Brown wrote that this "seems to be a contradiction of Nyerere's earlier order not to destroy civilian areas.") By afternoon much of Masaka had been leveled by explosives. The Uganda Commercial Bank's local branch building was destroyed, causing the institution to run a deficit for the year, as were the Masaka District administrative headquarters, the Chief Magistrates Court, the Tropic Inn hotel, the regional governor's offices, the post office, the hospital, and the Masaka Recreation Ground facility. Various properties were looted. The 21st Battalion of the TPDF's 205th Brigade was deployed to Mbirizi to prevent any Ugandan reinforcements from arriving from Mbarara.

== Aftermath ==
According to Rwehururu, the fall of Masaka greatly hurt the morale of the Ugandan forces. He elaborated that it surprised and troubled Ugandan commanders, who felt that the defeat made Kampala, the capital, vulnerable to attack. They mobilised additional forces and began planning for a defence of the city. The day following the battle the TPDF and several dozen Ugandan rebels bombarded Mbarara and, after seizing it, destroyed what buildings remained with dynamite. The Suicide Battalion further retreated from the village of Villa Maria to the north. Other Ugandan forces retreated to Lwera near Lukaya, while Brigadier Maliyamungu got lost in the bush for more than a week. Amin was enraged by the loss of Masaka, and upon hearing news of its capture during a meeting he reportedly drew a revolver and fired six shots into the ceiling.

Nyerere feared the international implications of sending his troops far into Uganda and the destruction of Masaka. Wishing to provide cover for the TPDF's actions and possibly incite a revolt in the Uganda Army, he requested Obote to pen a document supposedly written by the soldiers of the Suicide Battalion, declaring that they had mutinied and taken Masaka away from Amin's control on their own. Obote complied, and Tanzanian Presidential Press Secretary Sammy Mdee was instructed to covertly publish it. Mdee wired it from his office in Dar es Salaam to Nairobi, pretending that it had come from a telex machine in Uganda. The Nairobi journalists were suspicious of its authenticity, but for lack of clear news about the war published it anyway. The statement was also published in the Tanzanian press. In addition to its claims about the Suicide Battalion's mutiny, it requested "soldiers in every unit to follow our example so as to avoid further unnecessary loss of life." Though most observers did not believe it to be genuine, the forged declaration—in the context of the overall confusion and lack of public information about the war—gave the Tanzanian Government means to dodge inquiries about its troops' activities in Uganda.

Masaka after the battle and subsequent destruction

The capture of Masaka and Mbarara disrupted land and air communications across East Africa. After the former's fall the Ugandan government impounded many Rwandan trucks in the country to assist the war effort, contributing to shortages of fuel and other goods in Rwanda. Radio Uganda erroneously declared that Masaka was retaken on 28 February after intense fighting despite the public announcement by Ugandan rebels that the town was under their control. Nyerere responded by daring Amin to let international observers travel to Masaka to verify his claims. Amin did order a counter-attack to retake it, and a column of Ugandan and Libyan forces (which had been sent by Muammar Gaddafi) was assembled for the purpose. It met advancing Tanzanian forces in Lukaya in March and was defeated. The rebels declared Masaka "liberated territory" and installed Paulo Muwanga as a provisional civilian governor of the region. According to the militant Yoweri Museveni, the rebels under his command recruited supporters in the Mbarara region, but Obote's men refrained from the doing the same in Masaka for fear that southern tribesmen would not be loyal to them, much to Muwanga's chagrin. Museveni speculated that this soured Nyerere's opinion of Obote, and led him to sponsor a conference in Moshi that led to the unification of several rebel groups under an umbrella organisation, the Uganda National Liberation Front (UNLF). The journalists Tony Avirgan and Martha Honey stated that Muwanga attempted to recruit new rebels, but that his closeness to Obote discouraged suspicious locals from signing up. The mass uprising against Amin envisioned by Obote did not materialise. The TPDF moved its operating headquarters to Masaka and it remained there until Entebbe was captured.

Nyerere originally planned to halt his forces in Masaka and allow the Ugandan rebels to attack Kampala and overthrow Amin, as he feared that scenes of Tanzanian troops occupying the city would reflect poorly on his country's image abroad. However, Ugandan rebel forces did not have the strength to defeat the incoming Libyan units, so Nyerere decided to use the TPDF to take Kampala. Tanzanian leaders were also inclined to capture the city after Amin's announcement that the inhabitants of Masaka and Mbarara would face retaliation for welcoming the Tanzanian invasion. (Note: Tanzanian soldiers had found notes pinned up on trees around the towns begging that they not withdraw and leave them unprotected.) (Note: The Masaka District Governor also pledged bloodshed in Masaka if the town was retaken by Amin's forces.) The successful formation of the UNLF organisation also eased Tanzanian concerns about the aftermath of a seizure of the capital. Kampala was secured by the TPDF on 11 April. Combat operations in the country continued until 3 June, when Tanzanian forces reached the Sudanese border and eliminated the last resistance. The TPDF withdrew from Uganda in 1981.

=== Legacy ===
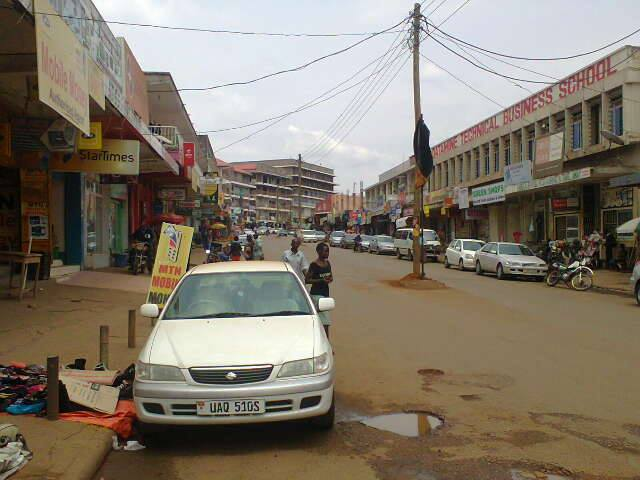
Masaka in 2014. The town did not fully recover from its destruction until the 2010s.

Ugandan Lieutenant Colonel Abdu Kisuule later said that the Ugandans' defeat at Masaka was critical in determining their later loss of the entire war. The town was left heavily damaged by the battle, and most of the population sought refuge in lodges in Kampala after the war. By 1980 only 6,000 residents remained in Masaka. The Masaka District administrative headquarters were relocated to a private residence. The assistant district commissioner estimated that it would cost $20 million to rebuild the town. Masaka was further damaged by fighting in 1985 during the Ugandan Bush War. As late as 2002 ruins from the 1979 conflict were still visible, and some compromised buildings remained abandoned. By 2013 most of the damaged landmarks had either been replaced or were being rehabilitated. Records of municipal property were lost when the town hall was destroyed, and in lieu of the documentation of ownership businessmen privatised the public lands for their own use. Following a petition from the local government, in 2013 the Ministry of Lands returned 23 disputed properties to municipal control.

Political scientist Daniel Acheson-Brown wrote that Masaka's destruction was "not in keeping with the proper conduct of war". (Note: Acheson-Brown based his judgment on the criteria of just war theory as expressed in Michael Walzer's book, Just and Unjust Wars.) When the Catholic Church considered canonising Nyerere as a saint in 2016, Masaka District chairman Jude Mbabali declared his disapproval, accusing the Tanzanian President of ordering the leveling of Masaka and failing to help it rebuild.
