= David Musuguri =

Tanzanian military officer (1920–2024)

- Born: David Bugozi Musuguri; 4 January 1920; Butiama, Tanganyika
- Died: 29 October 2024 (aged 104); Mwanza, Tanzania
- Military career
- Allegiance: Britain; Tanganyika; Tanzania
- Branch: King's African Rifles; Tanganyika Rifles; Tanzania People's Defence Force
- Service years: 1943–1988
- Rank: Lieutenant general
- Nickname: General Mutukula
- Commands: 20th Division TPDF; TPDF
- Conflicts: World War II; Battle of Madagascar; Uganda–Tanzania War; Battle of Simba Hills; Battle of Masaka; Battle of Lukaya; Operation Dada Idi

David Bugozi Musuguri (4 January 1920 – 29 October 2024) was a Tanzanian military officer who served as Chief of the Tanzania People's Defence Force from 1980 until 1988.

== Biography ==
=== Early life ===
David Musuguri was born on 4 January 1920 in Butiama, Tanganyika. (Note: According to Thomas Molony, Musuguri was born on 4 January 1923.) In 1938, he underwent bhakisero, a traditional rite of passage for Zanaki males involving the filing of the top incisors into triangular shapes.

=== Military career ===
On 9 August 1943, Musuguri enlisted in the King's African Rifles (KAR), beginning as a private. He later served with the KAR in Madagascar. By 1947 he was a sergeant and acted as an instructor at Kahawa Barracks in Nairobi, Kenya. While there he met future Ugandan dictator Idi Amin, who was a pupil of his. In 1957, the British administration introduced the rank of effendi into the KAR, which was awarded to high performing African non-commissioned officers and warrant officers (it was not a true officer classification). Musuguri was given the rank after undergoing a six month-long training course. In December 1961, Tanganyika became a sovereign state and several units of the KAR was transferred to the newly formed Tanganyika Rifles. The rank of effendi was shortly thereafter abandoned, and, in February 1962, Musuguri was promoted to lieutenant. During the Tanganyika Rifles mutiny of January 1964, Musuguri was stationed in Tabora. Rebellious troops, attempting to remove and replace their British officers, declared him a major. He studied military command and staffing in China from 1975 to 1976.

I am proud that I participated in chasing Idi Amin Dada to Saudi Arabia where he sought for asylum. But I can assure you, there is no war that is good. War means killing.

— Musuguri's reflection on the Uganda–Tanzania War

Though reportedly illiterate, Musuguri eventually rose to the rank of brigadier by 1978. On 19 January 1979, he was promoted to major general and given command of the Tanzanian People's Defence Force (TPDF)'s 20th Division, a force that had been assembled to invade Uganda following the outbreak of the Uganda–Tanzania War in 1978. During the war, he garnered the nom de guerre "General Mutukula", (Note: According to TPDF Colonel Stephen Isaac Mtemihonda, this nickname was initially coined by Brigadier Mwita Marwa when he congratulated his superior for ordering a successful attack during the Battle of Mutukula after declaring the requisite codeword, "Mutukula", over the radio.) and successfully commanded his forces during the battles of Simba Hills, Masaka, and Lukaya, as well as Operation Dada Idi. Over the course of the conflict he took charge of over a dozen Ugandan orphans and oversaw their care until they could be turned over to relatives. Several Ugandans later reported that he made efforts to instill discipline in his forces operating in their country and was polite to local civilians.

In early November 1980, Musuguri was appointed Chief of the TPDF. He returned to Tanzania the following week to take up his new post. On 30 December, President Julius Nyerere promoted him to lieutenant general. On 7 February 1981, Ugandan President Milton Obote gave Musuguri two spears in honor of "his gallant action in the Battle of Lukaya". During his tenure, he was accused of encouraging ethnic favoritism in the armed forces. He was opposed to withdrawing Tanzanian troops from Uganda in 1981 on the grounds that the country had not yet built a reliable armed force, but Nyerere overruled him. His retirement was announced on 31 August 1988, effective the following day.

=== Later life and death ===
Following his retirement, Musuguri returned to Butiama. In 2002, he endorsed the creation of an East African federation between Tanzania, Uganda, and Kenya. In 2014, he was awarded the Order of the Union Third Class by President Jakaya Kikwete. Musuguri turned 100 on 4 January 2020, and died in Mwanza on 29 October 2024, at the age of 104. He was buried in a funeral in Butiama on November 4.

== Citations ==
Military offices
Preceded by Abdallah Twalipo	Chief of Tanzanian People's Defence Force; 1980-1988	Succeeded by Ernest Kiaro
