= Siege of Masaka =

1985 battle of the Ugandan Bush War

- Part of the Ugandan Bush War
- Siege of Masaka (Uganda)
Date	24 September – 10 December 1985
Location	Masaka, Uganda
Result	National Resistance Movement victory
Territorial changes	Masaka captured by the National Resistance Army

Belligerents
Uganda	National Resistance Movement

Commanders and leaders
John Tebandeke †; Olanya Ojara (POW); James Tibamuleka †; James Oketa	Salim Saleh; Patrick Lumumba

Units involved
Masaka Mechanised Regiment; 32nd Battalion	Mobile Brigade: 3rd Battalion

Strength
2,000–3,000	Unknown

Casualties and losses
2,000–3,000 captured	Light

The siege of Masaka was a battle of the Ugandan Bush War that took place from 25 September to 10 December 1985 in which forces of the National Resistance Army (NRA) besieged and eventually captured the large Ugandan town of Masaka, from the Uganda National Liberation Army (UNLA).

== Background ==
In April 1979, Tanzanian forces and the Uganda National Liberation Army (UNLA), a coalition of armed rebel groups united under the Uganda National Liberation Front (UNLF), invaded Uganda and deposed the President, Idi Amin. A new UNLF government was installed, but it was weak and exercised little control over the country. This was in part due to the UNLF's and its army's own internal divisions. The several-hundred-strong Kikosi Maalum group was loyal to Milton Obote, who had served as President before Amin took power. Yoweri Museveni controlled the Front for National Salvation, which had about 3,000 members. Over time, power shifted to pro-Obote elements in the government and the army. Obote assumed power in 1980 through a disputed election, and ruled through repressive methods, including the incarceration and killing of dissidents. In February 1981, Museveni and a small band of rebels began attacking UNLA forces, initiating the Ugandan Bush War. Shortly thereafter a new rebel coalition was organised as the National Resistance Movement (NRM). Museveni was made Vice-Chairman of the National Resistance Council, the group's political body, and Chairman of the High Command of the National Resistance Army (NRA), the Movement's armed organ. By July 1985, the NRA had been largely defeated and pushed out of its strongholds, and Museveni retired to Sweden.

On 27 July, several officers of the UNLA launched a coup which overthrew President Obote. General Tito Okello assumed power in his place. The new regime was weak and unstable, and Okello made overtures to anti-Obote rebel groups to form a coalition government and end the fighting. The coup upset many Lango soldiers, which constituted the second-largest ethnic group in the UNLA and were loyal to Obote. The NRM was highly critical of the new government and accused the UNLA of committing atrocities. The UNLF, conscious of its weakening political position, nevertheless pursued negotiations with the NRM. Museveni took advantage of the disruption caused by the coup to return to East Africa and rebuild the NRA.

== Prelude ==
In August, the NRA launched a series of coordinated attacks that resulted in the capture of significant amounts of territory in central and western Uganda. As part of the NRA's offensive, its Mobile Brigade was ordered to attack the town of Masaka, located 128 kilometres southwest of Kampala, the Ugandan capital. Masaka had key strategic importance for several reasons; it was one of the largest towns in the country, hosted a large market for the coffee trade, supported nearby ranching communities, and was located along a road network that connected Uganda to neighbouring states in the south and to the west. NRA commanders believed that the capture of Masaka would facilitate an attack on Kampala. Masaka was garrisoned by about 2,000 to 3,000 UNLA troops belonging to the 32nd Battalion and the Masaka Mechanised Regiment who were based out of a barracks at Kasijjagirwa, two kilometres outside of the town.

== Siege ==
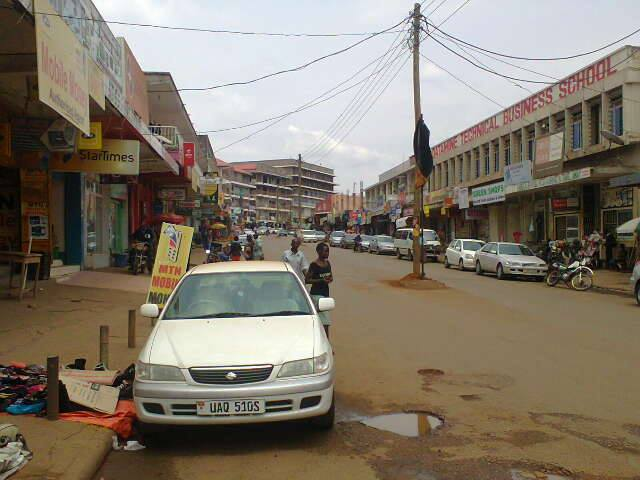
Masaka in 2014. The town itself quickly fell to the rebels, whereupon the UNLA garrison was confined to the well-fortified barracks.

On 24 September, the NRA's Mobile Brigade advanced eastward down the Masaka–Mbarara Road. Meanwhile, Lieutenant James Oketa, the UNLA's chief intelligence officer at Masaka, drove westward out of the town in his truck to conduct reconnaissance. He encountered the Mobile Brigade's 3rd Battalion at the outskirts of Masaka, east of the town of Kyabakuza in a valley surrounded by a large swamp. The NRA opened fire on his truck, and he quickly turned around and headed back into town. The NRA captured Masaka town the following day and laid siege to the barracks at Kasijjagirwa. (Note: Unidentified "travelers" already claimed that Masaka had been captured by the NRA on 12 August 1985. Similarly, the United Press International stated that the Siege of Masaka began in late August.) The first assault on the barracks was defeated, as the installation was well protected by fortifications including minefields, heavy machine guns, anti-aircraft cannons, and mortars.

The Masaka Mechanised Regiment launched counter-attacks against the 3rd Battalion during the following days. On 31 September, (Note: According to historians Cooper and Fontanellaz, the final UNLA counter-attack at Masaka took place on 31 September 1985, while the Ugandan New Vision newspaper stated that it occurred "nine or 10 days" after the siege's beginning.) UNLA forces led by Major John Tebandeke and coordinated by Oketa attacked Salim Saleh's headquarters in Masaka. They used flares to illuminate NRA positions, forcing 3rd Battalion commander Patrick Lumumba to withdraw some of his troops. Despite Lumumba's urging, Saleh refused to abandon his headquarters. The UNLA soldiers were eventually repelled by the 3rd Battalion, and Tebandeke was killed. This marked the end of the breakout attempts, as Tebandeke's successor, Captain Olanya Ojara, opted for a passive strategy. The garrison holed up in the barracks, hoping for reinforcements. On 18 November, Lieutenant Colonel James Tibamuleka, commander of the UNLA's 30th Brigade, was killed during the siege.

Tito tried and even came to Masaka and Mbarara
With Amin's soldiers. We beat them, those
That remained fled, when will they come back

— Excerpt of the NRA version of Tutasonga Mbele, an Ugandan marching song

Upon being informed of the situation at Masaka, the UNLA high command resolved to lift the siege. At some point in early December, it ordered the 11th Battalion, artillery units, allied FUNA militants, and helicopters to reopen the Kampala–Masaka Road. This operation failed in face of NRA resistance during the Battle of Katonga Bridge. Meanwhile, the garrison at Masaka suffered from dwindling supplies. Food, clean water, and medicine became scarce, and UNLA soldiers resorted to eating rats to survive. According to a NRA veteran, there were even incidents of cannibalism. Despite this, several died from starvation. In one instance, a soldier searching for food outside the barracks managed to retrieve a bunch of bananas, but stepped on a land mine while returning. Gravely wounded, he called for help, but the soldier that went out to retrieve him stepped on another mine, losing his leg. Both men screamed for assistance, but neither the NRA nor the UNLA were able to reach them, and they succumbed to their wounds three days later. Attempts by the UNLA's helicopters to airlift supplies to Masaka mostly failed, as the NRA drove them off with anti-aircraft guns.

In contrast to the desperate situation of the UNLA garrison, some NRA fighters regarded the siege as "enjoyable" because they had access to facilities in Masaka town that they had lacked during their insurgency in the bush. Many locals supported the rebels during the siege, and even joined the NRA. One of the factors that inspired many recruits was the large number of women soldiers and Kadogos (boy soldiers aged 10 to 14) among the besiegers of Masaka. These fighters were often smartly dressed, and sang revolutionary songs to local audiences, prompting many peasants to believe that the war "was easy".

As the conditions of the garrison worsened, the UNLA troops increasingly succumbed to indiscipline and divided into factions along ethnic lines. On 2 December, groups of UNLA troops began surrendering to the NRA. The NRA used its artillery to heavily shell the remaining government troops from 4 December. The rest of the Masaka garrison capitulated on 10 December. The NRA took between 2,000–3,000 UNLA troops prisoner and seized the stock of weapons from the armoury, while having suffered relatively light casualties.

== Aftermath ==
Immediately after the battle, the NRA 3rd Battalion was redeployed to assist forces in combat in Bulenga. NRA commanders housed the UNLA prisoners taken at Masaka in the senior secondary school "for their own security" as, according to Muhoozi Kainerugaba, the local population "would have only been too glad to lynch every one of them." Eventually, many of the UNLA soldiers including Captain Ojara switched allegiances and joined the NRA. The NRA's capture of Masaka and eventual success at Mbarara also solidified their control of the centre and south-western sections of the country and left Kampala vulnerable to attack. To take advantage of its improving military situation, the NRA High Command decided to launch an offensive to capture the city. On 24 January 1986, the NRA advanced into the Kampala, completely securing it two days later. Many of the NRA soldiers who had defected from the UNLA garrison in Masaka participated in the battle.

Having already been the site of much destruction during a 1979 battle between Tanzanian and Ugandan forces, Masaka was left further damaged by the siege. The town did not recover from the conflicts until the 2010s.
