= Uganda Marathon =

Marathon held in Masaka, Uganda

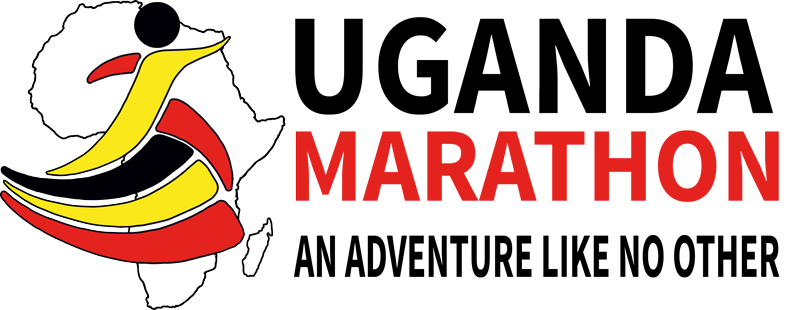
- Date: June
- Location: Masaka, Uganda
- Event type: Trail
- Distance: Marathon, half marathon, 10K
- Primary sponsor: Eco Brixs
- Established: 24 May 2015; 11 years ago (As The Uganda International Marathon)
- Course records: Marathon; Men's: 02:31:55 (2018) Andrew Biegon Women's: 03:50:05 (2016) Katie Sloane Half Marathon; Men's: 01:09:59 (2017) John Katdega Women's: 01:30:54 (2017) Amelia Beckstien
- Website: ugandamarathon.com

The Uganda Marathon is a long-distance running event held in Masaka, Uganda. The event was first run on 24 May 2015 and has been held in the Summer of every year since. the primary function of the marathon is to support community projects in the region surrounding the race.

The date of the next Uganda Marathon is Saturday 31 May 2020.

== Overview ==
Set over a challenging course around the town of Masaka, the event consists of three races, 42 km, 21 km, and 10 km distances. All races begin and end in the centre of the town at Liberation Square.

The Uganda Marathon is the largest sports fundraising event in Uganda, having raised over 2 billion Ugandan Shillings ($930,000). It is unique in the way that it combines the race with tourism, attracting international runners across the world to experience the local area and the projects that the race supports for a week prior to the race.

== History ==
Whilst not the first marathon event held in Uganda, The Uganda Marathon is the first of its name and the first long-distance running event held in Masaka. The MTN Kampala Marathon is held in the Ugandan capital each year.

The Uganda Marathon was founded in 2014 by 3 ex-city workers: Henry Blanchard, Andrew Miller & Nick Kershaw. After seeing the difference that can be made by linking people with the projects that they have fundraised for, they decided to quit their jobs and launch the event as a way to get people out to Uganda to see the impact they have made and run alongside the communities that they have helped

The first Uganda Marathon was held on 24 May 2015, more than 1,000 took part, with over 60 flying in for a full week before. In its first year, the Marathon raised over 325 million Ugandan Shillings ($90,000). All of this money was donated to 9 local projects which ranged from working with elderly residents to help them obtain a sustainable income to a charity battling HIV, which in some areas of Uganda affects 40 per cent of people. As at the end of the 2018 event, over 9,000 people have competed in the race since its inception - with a further over 325 experiencing the full week as well.

In 2016, The Uganda Marathon became the largest sports fundraising event in Uganda after raising 600 million Ugandan Shillings ($168,000). It also was voted the "Best International Event" in the 2016 Running Awards, and named one of the '9 Best Marathons in the World' by Red Bull.

In March 2020, the Uganda Marathon announced the postponement of the 2020 Uganda Marathon due to COVID-19 and government lockdown. In place of the physical marathon, a virtual event raised money for COVID relief efforts in Masaka.

In December 2021, the Uganda Marathon further announced that due to COVID-19 and the continued strict lockdown measures that were enforced by the Uganda government, the race needed to be further postponed to 2022. After a 2-year break, the marathon took place again on 4 June 2022.

== Primary Sponsors ==
In 2019 The Uganda Marathon offered its first primary name sponsor to Africell Uganda, who remained the primary sponsor until 2022.

Here is the list of Primary Sponsors:

Event year	Primary Sponsor	Logo
2019	Africell	
2022	Eco Brixs	

== Results ==
The inaugural 2015 Uganda Marathon had a little over 1,000 entrants. It has been held annually ever since.

The 2018 edition saw more than 3,000 runners involved. The winners and winning times for each edition are:

42 km - Men's winners
Year	Athlete	Nationality	Time	Notes
2015	Martin Ssembulya	Uganda	02:46:22	Course Record
2016	Lubega Robert	Uganda	02:44:00	Course Record
2017	Andrew Kiplang	Kenya	02:49:00	
2018	Andrew Biegon	Kenya	02:31:55	Course Record

42 km - Women's winners
Year	Athlete	Nationality	Time	Notes
2015	Nikki Cox	New Zealand	04:04:31	Course Record
2016	Katie Sloane	United Kingdom	03:50:05	Course Record
2017	Chloe Moss	United Kingdom	04:11:33	
2018	Phyllis Tsang	USA	04:11:23	Course Record
2019	Helen Chemutai	Uganda		

21 km - Men's winners
Year	Athlete	Nationality	Time	Notes
2015	Rega Roberts	Uganda	01:15:08	Course Record
2016	Unknown	Uganda	01:11:20	Course Record
2017	John Katdega	Uganda	01:09:59	Course Record
2018	Bahati Sadic	Uganda	01:11:05	
2019		Uganda		

21 km - Women's winners
Year	Athlete	Nationality	Time	Notes
2015	Unknown	Unknown	Unknown	
2016	Mawa Andanart	Uganda	Unknown	
2017	Shila Saina	Kenya	01:34:03	Course Record
2018	Amelia Beckstien	Germany	01:30:54	Course Record
2019	Annet Chebet	Uganda		

10 km - Men's winners
Year	Athlete	Nationality	Time	Notes
2015	Unknown	Unknown	Unknown	
2016	Unknown	Uganda	00:32:57	Course Record
2017	Unknown	Kenya	00:31:46	Course Record
2018	Brian Ategeka	Uganda	00:33:22	

10 km - Women's winners
Year	Athlete	Nationality	Time	Notes
2015	Unknown	Unknown	Unknown	
2016	Sheila Saina	Kenya	Unknown	
2017	Somna	Uganda	00:42:47	Course Record
2018	Elizabeth Teehan	USA	00:47:36	
2019	Amuron Agnes	Uganda	00:40:12	Course Record
