= John Butler Walden =

Tanzanian Army general (1939–2002)

- Walden as a brigadier in 1979
- Born: 12 December 1939; Tunduru, Tanganyika
- Died: 7 July 2002 (aged 62)
- Burial place: Mbeya, Tanzania
- Military career
- Allegiance: Britain; Tanganyika; Tanzania
- Branch: King's African Rifles; Tanganyika Rifles; Tanzania People's Defence Force
- Service years: 1957–?
- Rank: Major General
- Nickname: Black Mamba
- Commands: 207th Brigade TPDF
- Conflicts: Uganda–Tanzania War; Invasion of Kagera; Battle of Simba Hills; Battle of Masaka; Fall of Kampala

John Butler Walden (Note: He has also been called "Jack Walden".) (12 December 1939 – 7 July 2002) was a Tanzanian military officer. Born in British Tanganyika to a white father and black mother, he enlisted in the King's African Rifles in 1957 after finishing school. He eventually achieved the rank of sergeant and, following Tanganyika's independence, was transferred to the Tanganyika Rifles. In April 1963 he became a lieutenant. He was later promoted to major and held command of a camp in Mafinga. During the Uganda–Tanzania War of 1978 and 1979 Walden served as commander of the 207th Brigade in the Tanzania People's Defence Force with the rank of brigadier. In 1981 he organised the withdrawal of the Tanzanian troops in Uganda. By 1987 he had been promoted to major general and two years later he oversaw an anti-poaching operation. He died in 2002.

== Early life ==
John Butler Walden was born on 12 December 1939 to a white father, Stanley Arthur Walden, and a black mother, Violet Nambela in Tunduru, Tanganyika. Stanley Walden worked in the British colonial administration as Tunduru District Commissioner. Violet Nambela was the daughter of Andrew Sinkala, an official at the Tunduru Game Department.

In 1941 John Walden moved with his maternal grandmother to Mbeya. The following year his father was reassigned to a post in Njombe, Iringa, and Walden subsequently moved there. In 1945 he enrolled in Tosamanganga School, a Christian boarding school in Iringa which hosted many mixed-race students. His father secretly paid for his school fees. He spoke little with his parents while attending the institution, though the staff took a personal liking to him and his younger brother, Paul. (Note: Paul was five or six years younger than John, and though both were fathered by Stanley Arthur Walden, Paul may have been born to a different African mother.) He completed primary studies in 1952 and graduated in 1956 after completing the tenth grade, the most senior grade offered. According to historian Azaria Mbughuni, "the experience at Tosamaganga shaped the character of the young John. He learned to be tough and independent."

== Military career ==
In 1957 Walden saw a recruitment advertisement for the King's African Rifles (KAR), and, forgoing his original wish to join the navy, decided to enlist at Colito Barracks in Dar es Salaam. He enjoyed military life and saw his service as an opportunity for adventure. Due to a shortage of administrative staff in the training section, he worked as a clerk for several months before beginning formal military instruction in July. In February 1958 he completed his training and was assigned to A Company, 6th Battalion KAR at Colito. Around two months later he was promoted to lance corporal. In early 1958 Walden was sent to Nakuru for instruction in storekeeping. After completing it he returned to Colito, though his company had already been posted to Mauritius for routine garrison duties. The following year he joined his unit there, and served as a storekeeper, performed administrative duties, and acted as a translator for the sub-area commander. In 1960 a cyclone struck the island and Walden was given charge of co-ordinating the distribution of disaster relief supplies with the Red Cross. Afterwards, A Company returned to Dar es Salaam, staying there for one or two months before being moved to Shinyanga. In December 1961 Tanganyika became a sovereign state and the 6th Battalion KAR were transferred to the newly formed Tanganyika Rifles. In 1962 Walden was made a sergeant and became his company's quartermaster. With the assistance of his unit's commander, he was able to take multiple specialised training courses. In late 1962 he was enrolled in Mons Officer Cadet School. He graduated in April 1963 as a lieutenant and was given command of a platoon in B Company, 1st Tanganyika Rifles at Colito. Walden later chose "Black Mamba"—the name of a venomous snake—as his nom de guerre. He was a skilled marksman. In the late 1960s he held various responsibilities, including command of a Tanzania National Service camp in Mafinga, Iringa while holding the rank of major. Shortly after Mozambique obtained independence in 1975, Walden was sent there to serve as a military attaché.

During the Uganda–Tanzania War Walden served as commander of the 207th Brigade in the Tanzania People's Defence Force (TPDF) with the rank of brigadier. Ugandan forces occupied territory in northern Tanzania in late 1978, and during the TPDF's counter-attack Walden and his men recaptured Minziro and a sugar plantation. In early 1979 the TPDF invaded Uganda. The 207th Brigade was tasked with eliminating the Ugandan garrison at Katera. Walden ordered his troops to advance down a flooded path through a swamp to attack the town without being threatened by Ugandan troops. He accompanied his unit on the 50-hour trek. The brigade moved single-file through deep water and briefly lost contact with the local TPDF headquarters when its radios were rendered inoperative by the wet conditions. However, it were able to reach its destination and seize Katera after driving out the Ugandans with artillery fire. The unit was thereafter dubbed "the Amphibious Brigade" by Tanzanian soldiers. On 24 February Walden and his brigade participated in the capture of Masaka. On 10 April the TPDF attacked Kampala. The 207th Brigade advanced into the western portion of the city, and Walden oversaw the capture of President Idi Amin's residence. After the battle, his brigade was tasked with occupying the entirety of Kampala and maintaining order. In June 1981 he organised the withdrawal of all TPDF troops from Uganda.

In 1985 Julius Nyerere, the President of Tanzania, resigned and was replaced by Ali Hassan Mwinyi. In 1988 Mwinyi reportedly considered making Walden Chief of the TPDF, but passed him over for the appointment. (Note: According to the New Africa, Walden was the favourite among the soldiers for the post.) According to some sources, Mwinyi called him to tell him that while he was the most qualified officer for the role, he could not be given the appointment. The reasons for the decision were not specified. By 1987 Walden had been promoted to the rank of major general. In 1989 he was placed in command of Operation Uhai to combat poachers on Tanzanian lands. He spent several nights leading wildlife rangers on patrols in the desert, successfully reducing illegal hunting of elephants. By 1997, Walden served as the Tanzanian military attaché in London. He later retired from the army.

== Death ==
Walden died on 7 July 2002 and was buried in Mbeya.
