= Masaka =

City in Uganda

Masaka Masaka
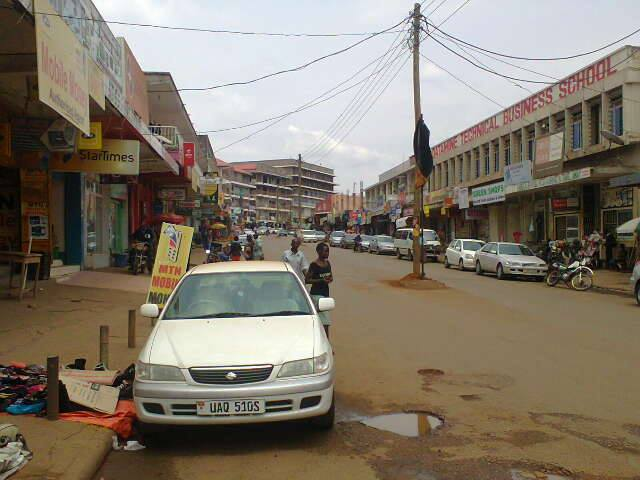
- Masaka in 2014

- Location in Uganda
- Coordinates: 00°20′28″S 31°44′10″E
- Country: Uganda
- Region: Buganda Region
- District: Masaka District
- Elevation: 1,288 m (4,226 ft)

Population (2024 Census)
  - Total: 285,509

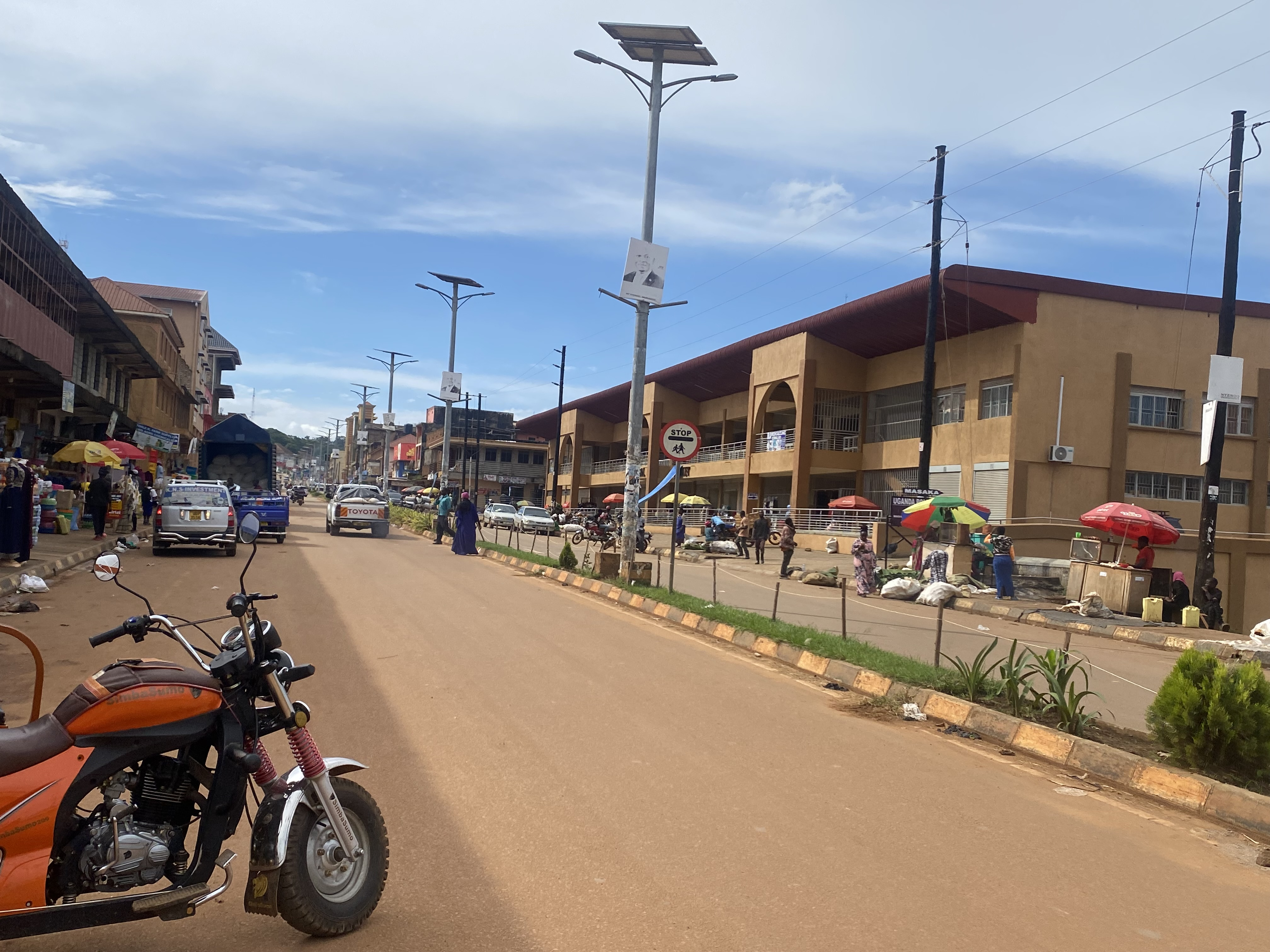
A street view in Masaka City

Masaka is a city in the Buganda Region in Uganda, west of Lake Victoria. The city is the headquarters of Masaka District.

== Location ==
Masaka is approximately 132 kilometres (82 mi) to the south-west of Kampala on the highway to Mbarara. The city is close to the Equator. The coordinates of Masaka are 0°20'28.0"S, 31°44'10.0"E (Latitude:-0.341111; Longitude:31.736111). Masaka lies at an average elevation of 1,288 metres (4,226 ft) above sea level.

== History ==
Masaka was founded as a township in 1953. It became a town council in 1958 and a municipality in 1968.

Masaka, being one of the most developed districts during the conflicts for power that occurred after Ugandan gained its independence, was a strategically important location during the Uganda–Tanzania War (1978–79), and was accordingly garrisoned by Uganda Army troops. These soldiers terrorized the local civilians, prompting most to flee the town. On 23–24 February 1979, the Tanzania People's Defence Force and allied Ugandan rebels attacked the settlement, resulting in the Battle of Masaka. The town was bombarded with artillery, and fell to the Tanzanian-led forces after light resistance. The Tanzanians subsequently levelled much of the town to take revenge for atrocities committed by the Uganda Army during its previous invasion of northwestern Tanzania.

In course of the Ugandan Bush War, Masaka again suffered from fighting. The town was garrisoned by the Uganda National Liberation Army which served as Uganda's national army at the time. In late 1985, National Resistance Army rebels laid siege to the town. After heavy combat, Masaka's garrison surrendered on 10 December 1985.

In 2019 the Cabinet of Uganda, resolved to award Masaka city status, which was to become effective in July 2023. In November of the same year, the Cabinet revised the date of city status to 1 July 2020.

As of June 2021, the city of Masaka occupied a total area in excess of 100 square kilometres (25,000 acres). Masaka City Council, with assistance from the Central Ugandan government and the World Bank is in the process of implementing major road and street improvements, as part of the Municipal Infrastructure Development (USMID) program. The city had a working budget of USh73 billion (approx. US$21 million), in the 2020/2021 financial year.

== Population ==
According to the 2002 national census, the population of Masaka was about 67,800. In 2010, the Uganda Bureau of Statistics (UBOS) estimated the population at 73,300. In 2011, UBOS estimated the mid-year population at 74,100. In August 2014, the national population census put the population at 103,829.

In 2020, UBOS estimated the mid-year population of Masaka City at 116,600 people. The population agency calculated the population growth rate of the town to average 2.11 percent, between 2014 and 2020. The 2024 national census enumerated the people in Masaka City at 285,509.

Historical population
| Year | Pop. | ±% |
|---|---|---|
| 1969 | 12,987 | — |
| 1980 | 29,123 | +124.2% |
| 1991 | 49,585 | +70.3% |
| 2002 | 67,768 | +36.7% |
| 2014 | 103,227 | +52.3% |
| 2020 | 116,600 | +13.0% |
| 2024 | 285,509 | +144.9% |

== Overview ==
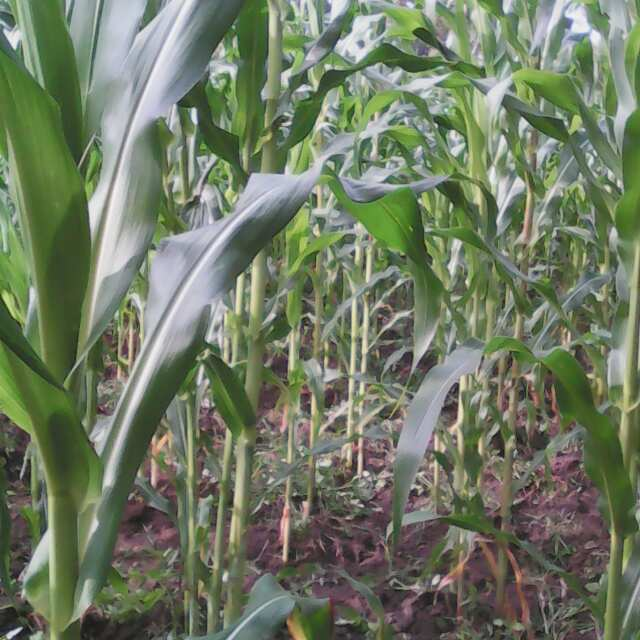
Maize plantation in Masaka

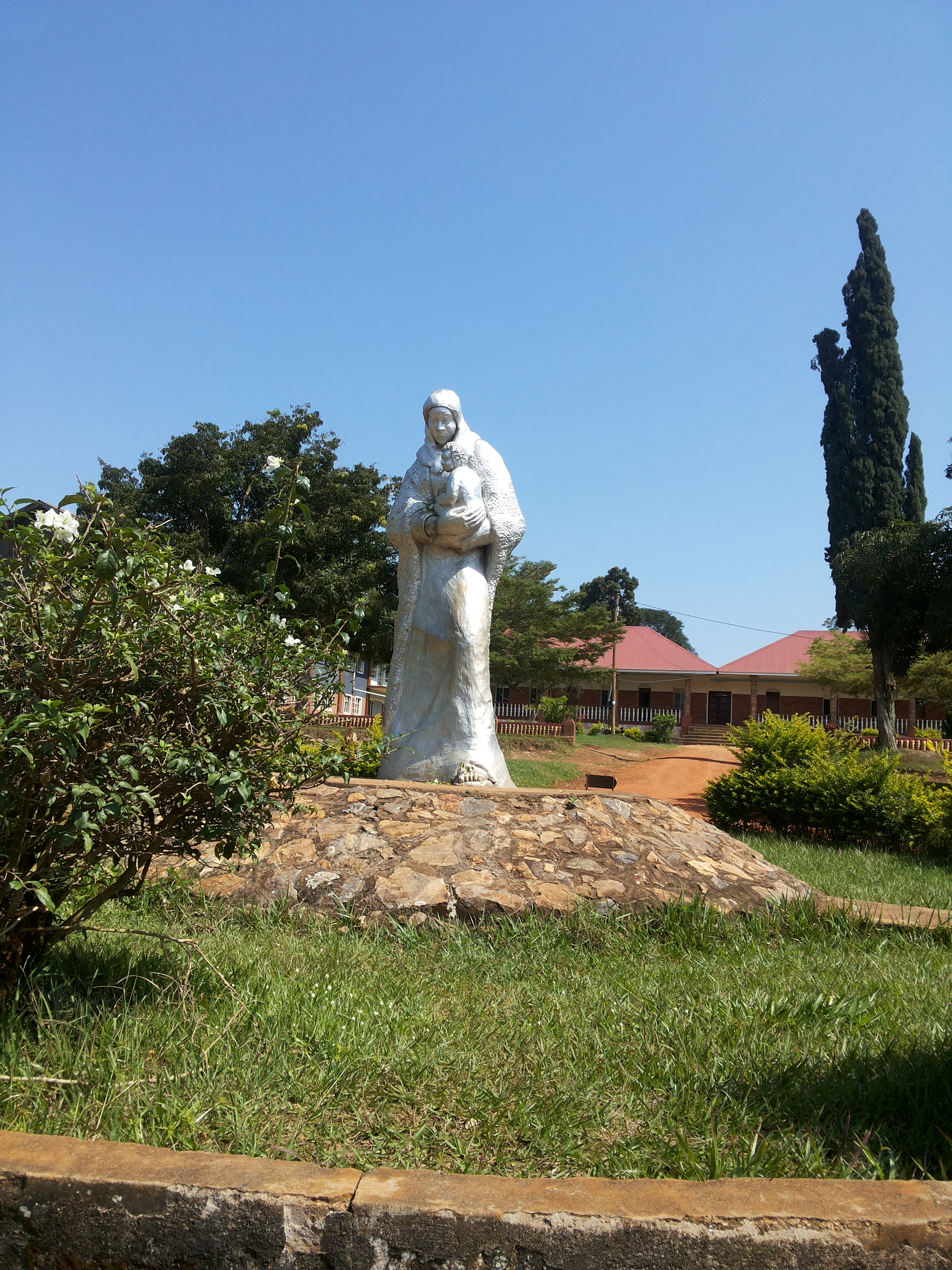
Villa Maria Catholic parish in Masaka

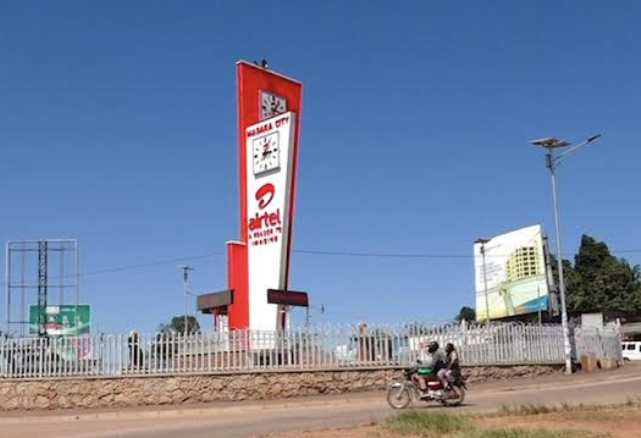
Masaka city clock tower

In 2016, before the metropolis attained city status, Masaka occupied 58 square kilometres (22 sq mi). It was divided into three administrative divisions, (a) Katwe-Butego (b) Kimaanya-Kyabakuza and (c) Nyendo-Mukungwe. It is further subdivided into 54 zones.

The annual Uganda Marathon event takes place in June, the race route loops twice through the town and the funds generated support local employment and community development.

== Points of interest ==
Points of interest located in or close to Masaka include the offices of Masaka City Council, the Masaka central market, headquarters of the Mechanized Brigade of the Uganda People's Defense Force, Masaka Regional Referral Hospital, Masaka Currency Center (a currency storage and processing facility owned and operated by the Bank of Uganda), the main campus of Muteesa I Royal University, Western Campus of Kampala University and St. Henry's College Kitovu. The headquarters of Radio Buddu FM are also located here.

Lake Nabugabo, a small freshwater lake located approximately 23 kilometres (14 mi), by road, east of Masaka. It is a satellite lake of Lake Victoria, being only 4 kilometres (2.5 mi) away from its shores separated by a shoal. The local community is heavily dependent on the lake due to high population density and subsistence agriculture practices. The lake and its surroundings are rich in fauna and flora, with the catchment area being home to two endemic flowering plants not found elsewhere, and fourteen species in Uganda are known only in this area; as well as several native fish and almost 300 unique plant species.

== Religion In Masaka ==
Out of the roughly 1,826,286 people that come under the Masaka Diocese, 1,077,508 of them identify as Catholic. The headquarters of the Roman Catholic Diocese of Masaka is based on Masaka. It is part of the Ecclesiastical Province of Kampala and serves as one of the original dioceses established in Uganda that has remained undivided since its creation. The diocese covers an area of 21,199 square kilometers (8,188 square miles) and comprises 57 parishes and 9 spiritual centers spanning 10 districts in the Greater Masaka Region.

St Paul's Cathedral is a cathedral of the Church of Uganda located on Kako hill, approximately 10 kilometres (6.2 mi) by northeast of Masaka. It also serves as the seat of the Diocese of West Buganda, carved out of the Namirembe Diocese in 1960. Upon this inauguration, St Paul's Church at Kako was elevated to the status of a cathedral and became the diocesan headquarters.

== Hamda Vocational and Social Institute ==
Hamda Taryam was a well-known Emirati philanthropist in Uganda who initiated various charitable projects through her foundation, the Hamda Foundation for Charitable Investments. In March 2022, at the Emirates Custom Show exhibition, a new project called the Hamda Vocational and Social Institute in Uganda's Maska region was announced to support Ugandan orphans, ensuring they qualify for the market, with proceeds going towards humanitarian and charitable projects sponsored by the Foundation. This institute, a continuation of the 'Taryam School' project for orphans, is part of a group of humanitarian projects previously completed by the foundation. The project for orphans provides free education to 350 male and female students at all levels.

The foundation also completed a non-profit hospital project for the city, which cost over Dh800,000. The hospital began operating on November 11, 2020, and has treated about 300,000 patients free of charge, as well as performed 5,000 births.

== Notable people ==
- Justine Nameere, television presenter, lawyer, and member of parliament, representing Masaka City in the 12th parliament
- Edward Ssekandi, Vice President of Uganda
- Herman Basudde, late performing artist
- Charles Peter Mayiga, Katikkiro of Buganda
- Erias Lukwago, Lord Mayor Kampala City
- Mathias Mpuuga, Former Leader of the Opposition in Parliament
- Edrisah Kenzo Musuuzah, Performing Artist
- Wilson Bugembe, musician
- Mukasa Mbidde, politician and economist
- Owen Emmanuel Sseremba, Scholar and Researcher at Makerere University. Former Chairman Masaka District Land Board and President of the Alumni of St. Henry's College Kitovu.
- Robinah Nansubuga, art curator and filmmaker

== See also ==
- List of cities and towns in Uganda
- Masaka Sports Stadium
- Battle of Masaka

== Photos ==
- The Uganda international marathon route loops Masaka Town, many photos of the town on their website
