= Robinah Nansubuga =

Ugandan curator and set designer

Robinah Nansubuga (born 1986) in Masaka, Uganda), is an independent art curator and filmmaker currently based in Kampala. She is also a set designer dedicated to promoting artists and enhancing East Africa's art network.

== Career ==
Nansubuga was born in 1986 in Masaka. She began her career in 2004 at the Ndere Cultural Centre and later held roles at Afriart Gallery and Fas Fas Art Gallery in Kampala. She was project manager at 32° East | Ugandan Arts Trust until 2015. She launched Ekyoto, a project fostering discussion on Ugandan traditions; and is a committee member of Arterial Network Uganda, which supports the nation's art scene. Nansubuga has curated numerous artistic projects both domestically and internationally, including events like the KLA ART 014 Festival and Framer Framed’s Simuda Nyuma. Her work also extends to festival direction, workshops, and conferences speaking on Ugandan arts and heritage. In 2018, she served as the artistic director of MTN Nyege Nyege, a major festival supported by the British Council, showcasing her commitment to advancing East African art on the world stage.

Nansubuga is an associate curator for Satellites-of-Art (SOA), an online platform connecting African, Latin American, and Middle Eastern artists with buyers in the Northern Hemisphere.
