= Sun Heping =

Sun Heping, may refer to:

- Sun Heping (diplomat)
- Sun Heping (scientist)
