= Battle of Karuma Falls =

1979 battle of the Uganda-Tanzania War

Coordinates: 2.234167°S 32.246389°E

- Part of the Uganda–Tanzania War
Date	17 May 1979
Location	Karuma Falls, Uganda
Result	Tanzanian victory
Territorial changes	Karuma Falls occupied by Tanzanian forces

Belligerents
Tanzania	Uganda

Commanders and leaders
(Tanzania) Muhiddin Kimario; Ahmed Mazora	Unknown

Units involved
205th Brigade	Unknown

Strength
1 brigade 7 tanks	1 company 3 buses

Casualties and losses
3–6 killed 6 wounded 1 tank destroyed 1 Land Rover destroyed	8–12 killed

The Battle of Karuma Falls was one of the last battles in the Uganda–Tanzania War, fought between Tanzania and Uganda Army troops loyal to Idi Amin on 17 May 1979. Soldiers of the Tanzania People's Defence Force attacked Ugandan forces at the bridge over the Nile River at Karuma Falls. Tanzania's 205th Brigade was tasked with advancing from Masindi to Gulu, taking a route which passed over the Karuma Falls Bridge. The brigade assaulted the crossing on the morning of 17 May with tanks and artillery and one of its battalions ran over the bridge to attack the Ugandan positions. The Ugandans destroyed a TPDF tank, delaying the Tanzanians long enough to board buses and retreat to Gulu. The Tanzanians secured Karuma Falls before capturing Gulu several days later.

== Background ==
Map of the battles of the Uganda–Tanzania War

In 1971 Idi Amin launched a military coup that overthrew the President of Uganda, Milton Obote, precipitating a deterioration of relations with the neighbouring state of Tanzania. Amin installed himself as President and ruled the country under a repressive dictatorship. In October 1978 Amin launched an invasion of Tanzania. Tanzania halted the assault, mobilised anti-Amin militant groups, and launched a counter-offensive.

In a matter of months, the Tanzania People's Defence Force (TPDF) and its Ugandan rebel allies (unified under the umbrella organisation, Uganda National Liberation Front (UNLF)) defeated the Uganda Army in a number of battles, and occupied Kampala, Uganda's capital, on 11 April 1979. With his military disintegrating, Amin's rule collapsed. Having escaped from Kampala, he traveled to a succession of cities in eastern and northern Uganda, urging his remaining forces "to go back and fight the enemy who had invaded our country", even as he prepared to flee into exile. Most Uganda Army units opted to surrender, desert or defect to the Tanzanian-led forces, but some decided to continue to fight for Amin's defunct regime. The Tanzanians and the UNLF allies continued their advance to secure eastern and northern Uganda.

== Prelude ==
The TPDF's 205th Brigade, which had occupied the town of Masindi, was ordered to capture Gulu. The TPDF's two brigade-strong "Task Force", was instructed to secure the West Nile District. Both paths required the TPDF to take the Kampala–Gulu Road, which passed over the Nile River via the bridge at Karuma Falls. It was decided that the 205th Brigade, commanded by Brigadier Muhiddin Kimario, would advance first and secure the crossing. The bridge, which lay 60 kilometres (37 mi) south of Gulu, was one of three such crossings over the Nile in Uganda, and it had been frequently used by Amin's agents to dump the bodies of executed dissidents into the river. Area residents also reported that bodies of Ugandan soldiers who had been killed in combat were disposed of there. Anti-Amin militants of Yoweri Museveni's Front for National Salvation were originally supposed to seize the location before Kampala fell, but moved too slowly. A group of Uganda Army soldiers maintained a roadblock at the Karuma Falls Bridge, where they harassed and robbed passing civilians.

The 205th Brigade's advance was delayed due to a gasoline shortage, and by the time the requisite fuel had arrived in Masindi, the unit was two days beyond schedule. Kimario had his men move faster to make up for the lost time so as to not interfere with the plans of the Task Force, which was following them. The evening before the brigade was to cross the river, a reconnaissance team spotted a company of Uganda Army soldiers at the bridge. Since the rough terrain in the area made crossing elsewhere difficult, Kimario decided that a direct attack on the bridge would be necessary.

== Battle ==
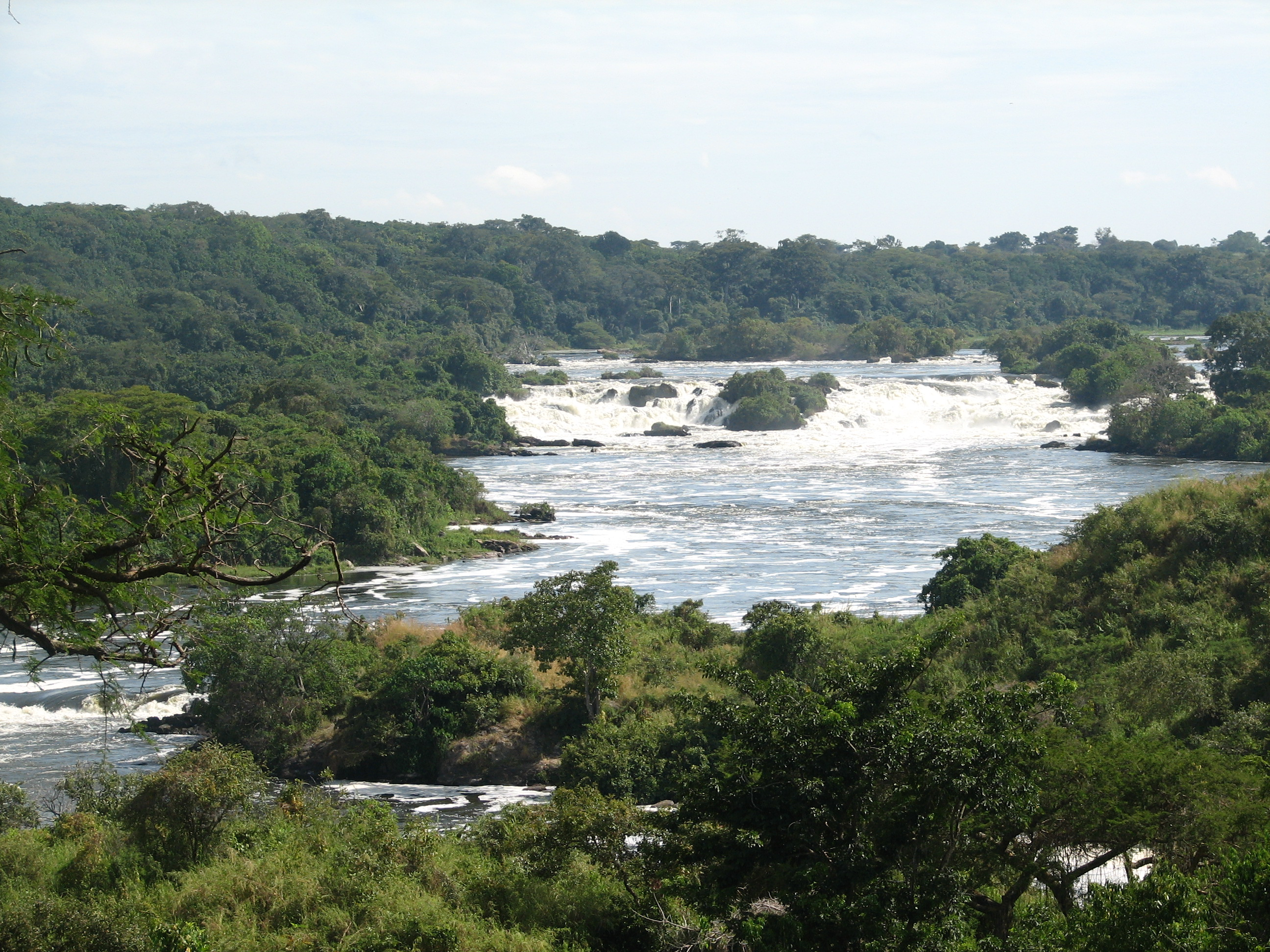
The Karuma Falls of the Nile River—the namesake of the town—as seen from the Gulu road.

On the morning of 17 May 1979 (Note: Tanzanian Lieutenant Colonel Steven Isaac Mtemihonda stated that the battle took place on 14 May.) the 205th Brigade advanced towards the south end of the Karuma Falls Bridge. The Tanzanians saw a large group of Ugandan soldiers gathered to the north of the bridge near a blind corner of the Gulu road. The 205th Brigade conducted a 10-minute artillery barrage of the northern bank of the river. The Ugandans did not respond, leading Kimario to assume that they had fled. However, when the Tanzanians began advancing, the Ugandan troops subjected them to small-arms fire. Three Tanzanian tanks moved to the front of the brigade's column, and the Ugandans reacted by initiating a mortar barrage.

One mortar shell narrowly missed a tank, and several Tanzanian soldiers were quickly killed. Kimario left his Land Rover to take sight of the battle, and shortly thereafter it was struck and destroyed. A Tanzanian battalion led by Lieutenant Colonel Ahmed Mazora charged across the bridge under the cover of their own artillery, which summarily eliminated the Ugandan mortar team. Seeing the Tanzanians bearing down on their positions, the Ugandans turned and retreated towards Gulu. Mazora's men pursued them with the assistance of three tanks. (Note: Mtemihonda stated that only two tanks assisted the battalion, and that the first's periscope was struck, inhibiting the ability of the driver to see. Ugandan Lieutenant Colonel Abdu Kisuule, who was accompanying the Tanzanians as a guide, also stated that only two tanks charged over the bridge.) When the vehicles crossed the bridge, their commander decided to move them up to higher ground so they would have a better position to open fire. As one of the tanks turned, a Ugandan soldier emerged from behind a boulder and launched a rocket-propelled grenade. The tank was struck and caught fire, but its crew managed to evacuate. The action gave the Ugandans enough time to board their three buses and retreat down the road. Four additional Tanzanian tanks crossed the bridge and attempted to pursue them, but the buses were faster and successfully withdrew.

=== Casualties ===
The tank destroyed at Karuma Falls was the only TPDF tank lost due to enemy action during the war. (Note: Journalist Baldwin Mzirai wrote that this was the second TPDF tank lost due to enemy action.) Journalists Tony Avirgan and Martha Honey stated that six Tanzanians were killed in the battle, while journalist Baldwin Mzirai wrote that four died. The Associated Press (AP), citing Tanzanian military sources, said that three were killed. The AP also reported that six Tanzanians were wounded and that 12 Ugandans were killed. Tanzanian Lieutenant Colonel Steven Isaac Mtemihonda stated that his comrades "counted more than eight dead bodies" in the Ugandans' former positions.

== Aftermath ==
The Tanzanians secured Karuma Falls, and stationed a large detachment nearby to guard the road. The 205th Brigade continued its advance towards Gulu—which had been abandoned by the Uganda Army—and captured it a few days later without any resistance. The Tanzanian arrival coincided with widespread mob violence, as Acholi civilians attacked members of ethnic groups associated with Amin's government. The Acholi had suffered under Amin, and consequently sought revenge. There were numerous lynchings in and around Gulu, at least one of which was condoned by a Tanzanian officer. Other Tanzanian troops tried to stop the massacre and subsequent looting, but were unwilling to open fire on the crowds. Many members of the targeted groups—those of West Nile origin—fled the town and sought refuge in Catholic missions, which were placed under the protection of Tanzanian sentries.

The war ended on 3 June, when the TPDF reached the Sudanese border and expelled the last pro-Amin forces from Uganda. Remnants of the Uganda Army subsequently reorganised in the north-western border regions and launched a rebellion against the new Ugandan government in 1980. The TPDF withdrew from the country in 1981.
