= China–Uganda relations =

- China: Uganda

Uganda and the People's Republic of China have maintained strong economic and diplomatic relations since Uganda's independence in October, 1962. Trade between the two nations totaled over $1 billion in 2017, and $1.46 billion in 2024. Additionally, Chinese companies have contributed significantly to the building of infrastructure in Uganda. China also owns about 22% of Uganda's external debt.

== Diplomatic history ==
Since Uganda's independence in 1962, diplomatic relationships have existed between the two nations. China was one of the first nations to recognize the newly independent nation. In 1971, Uganda was one of 76 nations that voted in favor of Resolution 2758 restoring UN membership to the Chinese government. Following Yoweri Museveni's rise to power in 1986, the two nations have developed closer ties. He has made multiple visits to China, including in March 2015 to attend the Boao Forum for Asia Annual Conference, the Forum on China-Africa Cooperation (FOCAC) Beijing Summit in September 2018, and in June 2019 for a working visit. The two countries have also signed multiple cultural cooperation agreements since Museveni's rise, exchanging student and medical teams. For example, the Ministry of Foreign Affairs of China claims that since 1983 China has dispatched 23 medical teams, which total 218 medical personnel to Uganda. Additionally, between 2007 and 2009 China donated anti-malaria medicine worth $500,000 per year. Relationships between the two nations have been strengthened by a policy of non-interference in political affairs. Following the passage of the Uganda Anti-Homosexuality Act, 2014, Western criticism of the Ugandan government and Museveni's presidency increased. Many nations withdrew economic aid and support. China's policy of political non-involvement allowed them to take on the role of supplying aid and infrastructure to Uganda.

As of 2021, the Ugandan Ambassador to China is Oliver Wonekha The Chinese Ambassador to Uganda is Zhang Lizhong.

== Sovereignty issues ==
Uganda follows the one China principle. It recognizes the People's Republic of China as the sole government of China and Taiwan as an integral part of China's territory, and supports all efforts by the PRC to "achieve national reunification". It also considers Hong Kong, Xinjiang and Tibet to be China's internal affairs.

During the 2019-2020 Hong Kong protests, Uganda was among the African countries that expressed support for China's approach. In October 2019, Uganda's Ministry of Foreign Affairs issued a statement that Uganda "firmly supports the one country, two systems policy of the People's Republic of China on the matter of Hong Kong and other areas" and that "Hong Kong's affairs are China's domestic affairs."

== Economic relations ==
China and Uganda have a robust trade relationship. China's largest exports to Uganda are machinery and electrical equipment. Uganda's major exports to China include many raw goods such as hides, oils, and seeds. Trade between the two countries also significantly increased under Yoweri Museveni's presidency. Even within the last 10 years, the amount of trade between China and Uganda has more than quadrupled, from around $230 million in 2008 to over $1 billion in 2018. Recently in 2024, as stated by China's Ministry of Foreign Affairs, China exported $1.46 billion worth of goods, a year-on-year increase of 12%, while Uganda's exports to China totaled $79 million, up 13.8%. In addition to the trade flow between both countries increasing, the trade imbalance has also increased. In 2001, for example, the trade imbalance was $16 million whereas in 2009 it grew to over $228.7 million. Scholars argue that one reason Ugandan products cannot compete with China's advanced technology, heavy industrial products, and other processed products, is due to the technology gap between the countries. China has offered Uganda the option to export over 3,000 different goods to China with unilateral duty free and quota free access. However, there are limitations to this by Technical Barriers to Trade (TBT) which are quality standards and tariffs on processed goods coming into China.

Additionally, Uganda has emerged as a potential market for many Chinese businesses, both state-owned and private. These businesses include oil and construction, as well as smaller stores and factories for electronics, clothes, and other consumer goods. On March 28, 2025, the Embassy of the Republic of Uganda in China, in partnership with the Uganda Consulate in Guangzhou and the Liaoning Provincial Department of Commerce, hosted the first Ugandan-Chinese Mining and Petroleum Investment Promotion Conference. This conference brought together both Chinese and Ugandan senior officials, industry leaders, and investors to discuss investment in Uganda's mineral and energy resources.

Lastly, in April 2005, China and Uganda signed a Memorandum of Understanding to promote Chinese Citizens' Self-Funded Travel to Uganda. Uganda is also a destination for Chinese group tourism.

Uganda joined the Belt and Road Initiative (BRI) in 2018.

The two countries have also developed a partnership in education with Uganda hosting one Confucius Institute at Makerere University, which is organized by Xiangtan University, a Chinese University. In 2024, Nanjing University of Information Science and Technology, a Chinese University, and Makerere University, a Ugandan University, jointly established a Climate College.

=== Infrastructure development ===
China has been a significant contributor to numerous infrastructure projects in Uganda. For instance, Chinese construction companies have won contracts for projects such as the Mandela National Stadium and the country's largest hydroelectric dam at Karuma Falls. Most construction materials in these infrastructure projects have come from China which critics have argued has harmed the local growth of Uganda by slowing local industries that would otherwise provide these materials. Some incentives to China to support Uganda include opening new markets, political alliance with Uganda, and widening investment for Chinese companies.

China has been heavily involved in the funding of road infrastructure in recent years with approximately 30,000 km of highways being estimated to have been built or upgraded by Chinese companies by 2018. By the end of 2018, 37 road upgrading or rehabilitation projects were in the process of development with Chinese companies facilitating 27 of them. More recently, Chinese companies have been directing the construction of an express highway connecting the major city of Entebbe to the capital, Kampala. The loan from the Chinese Export-Import Bank of China (EXIM) for this project has totalled $350 million which Uganda missed a payment for in 2019. In one particular region, Northern Uganda, that has been recovering from two decades of insurgency by the Lord's Resistance Army, the construction of these roads by Chinese companies have fostered positive growth, regional trade, and development. For example, China has improved the road infrastructure in Gulu City, which has attracted new traders and businesses and made it a commercial hub of northern Uganda with traders coming from places as far as Juba, South Sudan. China has also been financing the Standard Gauge Railway from Kampala to Malaga which runs through multiple other countries. This Railway was meant to be completed in 2018 but Uganda failed to secure financing by the EXIM bank.

Another major project China has been heavily contributing to is the Entebbe International Airport expansion project. The Export-Import Bank of China (EXIM) largely funded the airport's $200 million expansion of a new terminal which was unveiled in December 2020. The construction of this terminal equipped the Entebbe International Airport to be able to handle up to 5 million passengers every year. In addition to this project allowing greater connectivity and tourism opportunities for the country, it also granted 1,500 new jobs for Ugandans.

China has also contributed to Uganda's Energy Sector by investing in hydroelectric power plants, transimssion lines, and grid upgrades. This is important for Uganda because power shortages have been occurring for decades which have affected the economy and development in the country. China has also been investing in Uganda's broadband connectivity and upgrading its digital infrastructure which contributes to the growth of Uganda's telecommunications sector. Agreements with China on developing a national data center which will help Uganda compete in the digital economy and consolidate its digital infrastructure have been signed. The Ugandan government also utilizes Chinese technology for small and large- scale agribusiness projects, with over 40 Chinese agricultural scientists having taken part in planning these projects in Uganda since 2012. For example, China invested in and facilitates schemes like Kibimba and Doho rice schemes where infrastructure within the schemes such as drainages have been improved, machinery for processing, and experts from China trained locals in handling machinery at various parts of processing. When the project begun, a demonstration farm was established to illustrate the process of producing rice. Now, approximately 4,385 Ugandan farmers use the Doho Rice Scheme which has improved their incomes. Additionally, because of this project, various infrastructure connected to the scheme were created such as a health facility to take care of the workers and the communities in the area, power lines, and roads between the scheme and the villages. After these projects that China facilitated, rice imports declined because of increased domestic production of rice. Other infrastructure projects China has contributed to include the Ministry of Foreign Affairs office building, fishing wharves, the Food and Ceramics Research Center, and the Kampala Ice Plant.

China's key financier that has been involved in investment in Uganda has been the EXIM Bank. Additionally, China's main instrument in its foreign investment takes the form of two kinds of loans: export buyer's credit and liangyou loans (concessional loans and preferential export buyer's credits that the EXIM bank exclusively offers). In 2019, Uganda's external debt amounted to US$8.3 billion: about 43% of its total GDP. In 2018, a report by the Ministry of Finance, Planning, and Economic Development indicated that Uganda's debt was 22% made up of debt to the China Exim bank, which was second to the World Bank which made up 40% of the total debt. The Ugandan Parliamentary Budget Committee claimed that this excessive borrowing is beyond the country's means. Additionally, the Bank of Uganda warned that a high debt burden could prevent public from investing in projects which could slow economic growth in Uganda.

== Public opinion in Uganda ==
Opinions vary in Uganda on the role China plays in the local economy. According to a 2015 survey by Afrobarometer, 58% of Ugandans believe China has a positive influence on Uganda, compared to only 7% saying negative. The largest positives of China's influence were China's investment in infrastructure, China's business investment, and the cost of Chinese products. Additionally, most Ugandan media sources portray Uganda as benefitting from its relations with China. Despite these positive opinions, some critics argue that trade imbalances and unethical business practices that hurt local traders result from the relations. For example, Ugandan workers at the Chinese funded Karuma dam have reported poor labor conditions such as long hours and low wages which neither the Chinese or Ugandan governments have addressed. By far the largest source of negative opinion was the quality of Chinese products. Public opinion of Chinese influence has improved in China since 2010.

Ugandan business owners have expressed opposition to Chinese influence in the country. Shopkeepers and creators of local goods have difficulty competing with the price of Chinese exports. In addition, local construction companies introduced a bill that would force the national government to prioritize local construction companies in the completion of government projects. This bill was vetoed, with MPs citing the inability of Ugandan construction companies to handle the scale of large infrastructure projects. Some Chinese business, particularly smaller private businesses, have also felt the effect of increased regulation and scrutiny from local government officials.

Research on relations between the two nations and cultures found that the major sources of animosity between the two nations include China's state-capitalism model and Ugandans' experiences with Chinese shopkeepers and employers who may harbor racial bias.

=== Incidents ===
In 2014, China sentenced two Ugandans to death for drug trafficking in Guangdong province. Although the Ugandan government claimed that the incidents did not impact diplomatic relationships between the two nations, many Ugandan citizens and MPs were angered by the perceived violation of sovereignty and human rights.

In 2018, many Chinese businesses in Ugandan industrial parks were vandalized and robbed, prompting President Museveni to increase security presence in these regions.

On 22 February 2019, the Chinese ambassador to Uganda Zheng Zhuqiang officiated the 1st graduation of Metropolitan International University in Kisoro District, Uganda.
