= Uganda–Tanzania War =

1978–1979 armed conflict in East Africa

- Major engagements of the conflict, primarily in Ugandan territory
Date	9 October 1978 – 3 June 1979 (7 months, 3 weeks and 4 days)
Location	Uganda and Tanzania
Result	Tanzanian victory; Collapse of the Second Republic of Uganda; Idi Amin flees into exile

Belligerents
Uganda; Libya; Palestine Liberation Organization; Supported by: Pakistan; Saudi Arabia	Tanzania; Uganda National Liberation Front: Kikosi Maalum; Front for National Salvation; Save Uganda Movement; Others; Mozambique; Supported by: Zambia; Angola; Ethiopia; Algeria

Commanders and leaders
Idi Amin; Yusuf Gowon; Isaac Maliyamungu; Ali Fadhul; Muammar Gaddafi; Mutlaq Hamdan (WIA); Mahmoud Da'as	Julius Nyerere; Abdallah Twalipo; Tumainiel Kiwelu; David Musuguri; Silas Mayunga; Milton Obote; Tito Okello; David Oyite-Ojok; Yoweri Museveni

Strength
20,000 troops; 4,500 troops; 400+ militants	150,000 troops; 2,000 troops; 800 troops

Casualties and losses
1,000 killed and 3,000 captured; 600+ killed and 59 captured; 12–200 killed or missing	373 killed; ~150 killed
- c. 1,500 Tanzanian civilians killed; 500+ Ugandan civilians killed

The Uganda–Tanzania War, known in Tanzania as the Kagera War (Swahili: Vita vya Kagera) and in Uganda as the 1979 Liberation War, (Note: The conflict has also been called the "Ugandan–Tanzanian War", the "War of Kagera", the "Liberation war of 1979", and the "Second Ugandan War" to distinguish it from the Uganda–Tanzania conflict of 1972.) was fought between Uganda and Tanzania from October 1978 until June 1979 and led to the overthrow of Ugandan President Idi Amin. The war was preceded by a deterioration of relations between Uganda and Tanzania following Amin's 1971 overthrow of President Milton Obote, who was close to the President of Tanzania, Julius Nyerere. Over the following years, Amin's regime was destabilised by violent purges, economic problems, and dissatisfaction in the Uganda Army.

The circumstances surrounding the outbreak of the war are not clear, and differing accounts of the events exist. In October 1978, Ugandan forces began making incursions into Tanzania. Later that month, the Uganda Army launched an invasion, looting property and killing civilians. Ugandan official media declared the annexation of the Kagera Salient. On 2 November, Nyerere declared war on Uganda and mobilised the Tanzania People's Defence Force (TPDF) to retake the salient. Nyerere also mobilised Ugandan rebels loyal to Obote and Yoweri Museveni to weaken Amin's regime. After Amin failed to renounce his claims to Kagera and the Organisation of African Unity (OAU) failed to condemn the Ugandan invasion, the TPDF occupied the towns of Masaka and Mbarara in southern Uganda.

While the TPDF prepared to clear the way to the Ugandan capital of Kampala, Muammar Gaddafi, the leader of Libya and an ally of Amin, dispatched several thousand troops to Uganda to assist the Uganda Army. The Palestinian Liberation Organisation also sent a number of guerrillas to aid Amin. In March, the largest battle of the war occurred when the Tanzanians and Ugandan rebels defeated a combined Ugandan-Libyan-Palestinian force at Lukaya. The loss of Lukaya led the Uganda Army to begin to collapse. Nyerere believed that Ugandan rebels should be given time to organise their own government to succeed Amin. He sponsored a conference of rebels and exiles in Moshi later that month, where the Uganda National Liberation Front (UNLF) was founded. Libya ended its intervention in early April and its troops left the country. On 10 April a combined TPDF-UNLF force attacked Kampala, and secured it the following day. Amin fled into exile while a UNLF government was established. In the following months, the TPDF occupied Uganda, facing only scattered resistance. It secured the Uganda–Sudan border in June, bringing the war to an end.

The war severely harmed Tanzania's fragile economy and inflicted long-lasting damage to Kagera. It also had severe economic consequences in Uganda, and brought about a wave of crime and political violence as the UNLF government struggled to maintain order. Political disagreements and the persistence of the remnants of the Uganda Army in the border regions ultimately led to the outbreak of the Ugandan Bush War in 1980.

== Background ==
=== Deterioration of Ugandan–Tanzanian relations ===
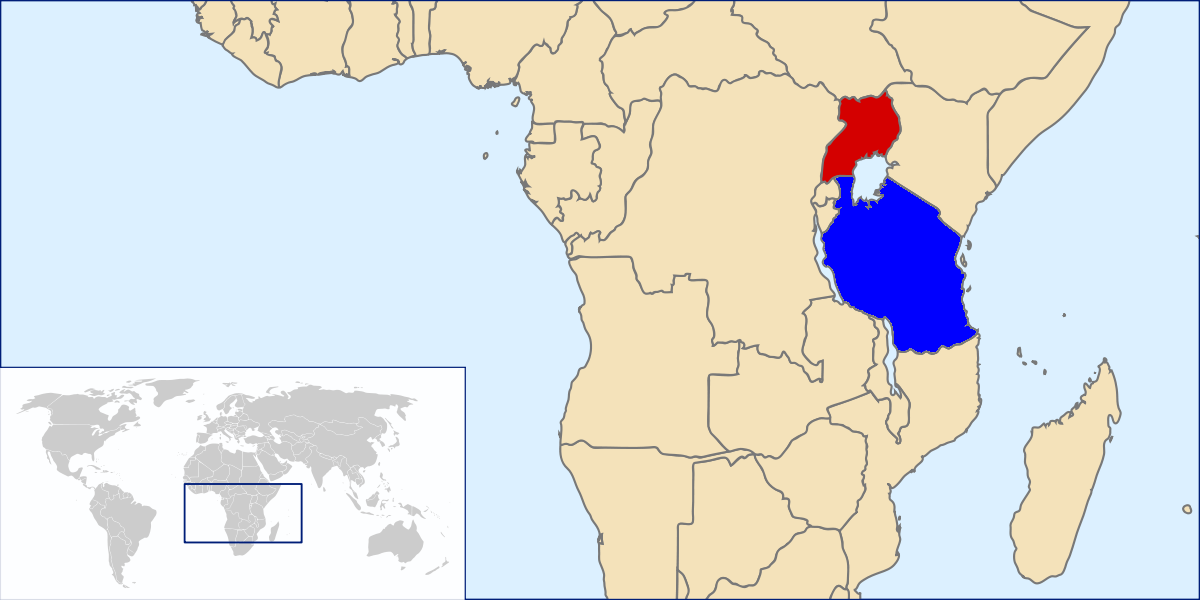
Uganda (red) and Tanzania (blue) in Africa

In 1971, Colonel Idi Amin took power following a military coup that overthrew the President of Uganda, Milton Obote, precipitating a deterioration of relations with neighbouring Tanzania. Tanzanian President, Julius Nyerere had close ties with Obote and had supported his socialist orientation. Amin installed himself as President of Uganda and ruled the country under a repressive dictatorship. Nyerere withheld diplomatic recognition of the new government and offered asylum to Obote and his supporters. As Amin launched a massive purge of his enemies in Uganda that saw 30,000 to 50,000 Ugandans killed, Obote was soon joined by thousands of other dissidents and opposition figures. With the approval of Nyerere, these Ugandan exiles organised a small army of guerillas, and attempted, unsuccessfully, to invade Uganda and remove Amin in 1972. Amin blamed Nyerere for backing and arming his enemies, and retaliated by bombing Tanzanian border towns. Though his commanders urged him to respond in kind, Nyerere agreed to mediation overseen by the President of Somalia, Siad Barre, which resulted in the signing of the Mogadishu Agreement. The accord stipulated that Ugandan and Tanzanian forces had to withdraw to positions at least 10 kilometres (6.2 mi) away from the border and refrain from supporting opposition forces that targeted each other's governments.

Nevertheless, relations between the two presidents remained tense; Nyerere frequently denounced Amin's regime, and Amin made repeated threats to invade Tanzania. At the same time, relations between Tanzania and Kenya grew sour, and the East African Community collapsed in 1977. Uganda also disputed its border with Tanzania, claiming that the Kagera Salient—a 720 square miles (1,900 km^{2}) stretch of land between the official border and the Kagera River 18 miles (29 km) to the south, should be placed under its jurisdiction, maintaining that the river made for a more logical border. The border had originally been negotiated by British and German colonial officials before World War I.

=== Instability in Uganda ===
Meanwhile, in Uganda, Amin announced an "economic war" in which thousands belonging to the Asian minority were expelled from the country in 1972 and their businesses placed under the management of Africans. The reform had disastrous consequences for the economy, which were further exacerbated by a United States boycott of Ugandan coffee on account of the government's failure to respect human rights. At the same time, Amin expanded the power of the armed forces in his government, placing many soldiers in his cabinet and providing those loyal to him with patronage. Most of the beneficiaries of his actions were Muslim northerners, particularly those of Nubian and Sudanese extract, who were increasingly recruited into the army. Amin violently purged southern ethnic groups from the armed forces and executed political opponents. In the following years, he survived several assassination attempts, becoming increasingly distrustful and repeatedly purging the senior ranks of the Ugandan military.

In 1977, a split in the Uganda Army developed between supporters of Amin and soldiers loyal to the vice-president of Uganda, Mustafa Adrisi, who held significant power in the government and wanted to eject foreigners from the military. In April 1978, Adrisi was severely injured in a suspicious car accident. When he was flown out of the country for treatment, Amin stripped him of his ministerial portfolios. He also announced the arrest of multiple police officials, and during the following month dismissed several ministers and military officers. The shakeup strained Amin's already narrow base of power in the military that was also declining in the face of the worsening economic situation, which eliminated patronage opportunities. Fearing for his personal safety and less confident in his charismatic abilities to diffuse the growing tension, Amin began withdrawing from the public sphere and conducting fewer visits with his troops. At around the same time, he began accusing Tanzania of violating Uganda's border.

== Course of the war ==
=== Outbreak of the conflict ===
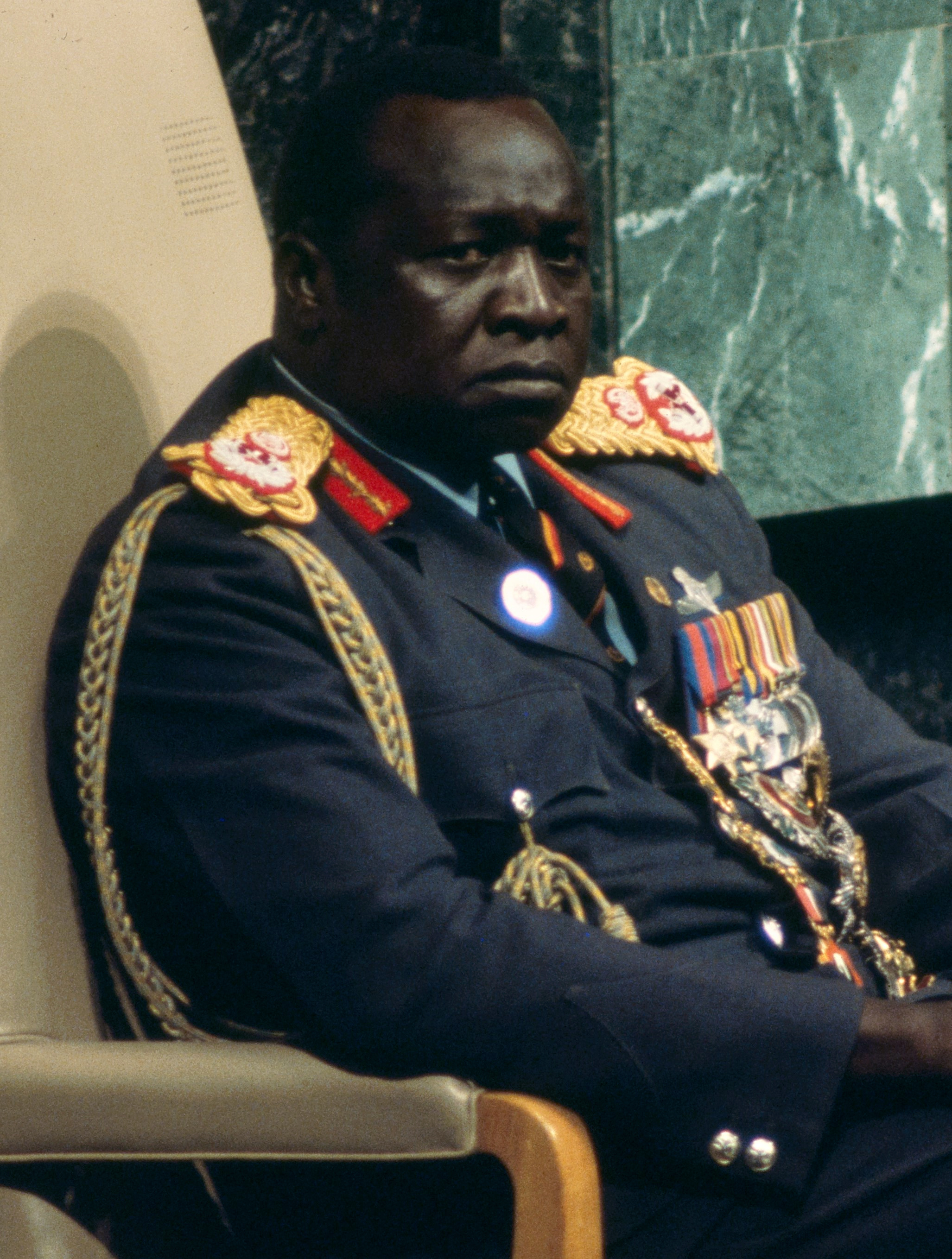
Ugandan President Idi Amin (1977)

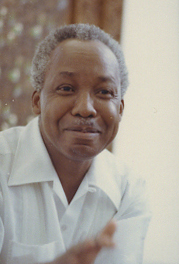
Tanzanian President Julius Nyerere (1976)

War broke out between Uganda and Tanzania in October 1978, with several Ugandan attacks across the border culminating in an invasion of the Kagera Salient. The circumstances surrounding the outbreak of the war are not clear, and numerous differing accounts of the events exist. Obote wrote that the decision to invade Kagera was "a desperate measure to extricate Amin from the consequences of the failure of his own plots against his own army." Several Uganda Army soldiers blamed Lieutenant Colonel Juma Butabika for starting the war, including Colonel Abdu Kisuule, who accused Butabika of engineering an incident at the border to create a pretext for invading Tanzania. According to Amin's son, Jaffar Remo, rumours of a potential Tanzanian invasion led members of the Ugandan high command to call for a preemptive attack on Tanzania. The Tanzanian military later argued that Amin's ultimate aim was to annex a large part of northern Tanzania, including the city of Tanga, in order to gain access to the sea for trading purposes. Ugandan journalist Faustin Mugabe found no evidence for this theory in Ugandan sources.

Several other Uganda Army officers have offered more mundane explanations for the invasion, according to which isolated conflicts along the border resulted in a spiral of violence that culminated in open warfare. Among the incidents identified as possible start points for the war are cases of cattle rustling, tribal tensions, a fight between a Ugandan woman and a Tanzanian woman at a market, as well as a bar fight between a Ugandan soldier and Tanzanian soldiers or civilians. Several Ugandan soldiers who endorsed the bar fight theory disagreed on the confrontation's exact circumstances but concurred that the incident occurred on 9 October in a Tanzanian establishment. They also agreed that after Butabika was informed of the altercation, he unilaterally ordered his unit, the Suicide Battalion, to attack Tanzania in reprisal. The soldiers stated that Amin was not informed of this decision until later and went along with it to save face. One Ugandan commander, Bernard Rwehururu, stated that Butabika lied to Amin about his reasons for attacking Kagera, claiming that he was repulsing a Tanzanian invasion. According to American journalists Tony Avirgan and Martha Honey, the bar incident occurred on 22 October, when a drunken Ugandan intelligence officer was shot and killed by Tanzanian soldiers after firing on them. That evening Radio Uganda declared that the Tanzanians had abducted a Ugandan soldier, and reported that Amin threatened to do "something" if he was not returned.

Another theory describes the invasion as the result of Ugandan troops chasing mutineers over the Tanzanian border. There are several different variations of this account, which was mostly circulated by non-Ugandan sources. Ugandan diplomat Paul Etiang and the local managing director for Royal Dutch Shell reported that soldiers of the Simba Battalion had shot new Sudanese recruits and that when other Ugandan forces were sent to contain them, they fled over the border on 30 October. Other versions attribute the mutinies to elements of the Chui Battalion or the Suicide Battalion. Political scientist Okon Eminue stated that about 200 mutineers reportedly took refuge in the Kagera salient. According to this version of events, Amin ordered the Simba Battalion and the Suicide Battalion to pursue the deserters, whereupon they invaded Tanzania. A Ugandan soldier interviewed by Drum claimed that the initial actions of the invasion were in fact a three-way fight between loyalist Uganda Army soldiers, Ugandan deserters, and Tanzanian border guards, with most of the deserters and a number of Tanzanians being killed. A few surviving mutineers reportedly found shelter in Tanzanian villages. Researchers Andrew Mambo and Julian Schofield discounted this theory as unlikely, noting that the battalions that are said to have mutinied remained relatively loyal to Amin's cause throughout the war, and instead supported the notion that Butabika escalated a dispute at the border into an invasion.

The Tanzania People's Defence Force (TPDF) had received only very limited intelligence about a possible Ugandan invasion, and was unprepared for this eventuality, as the Tanzanian leadership generally believed that Amin would not consider attacking Tanzania while his own country was affected by political, economic, and military instability. Even beyond the demilitarised zone established by the Mogadishu Agreement, there were almost no defences. Tanzania had tense relations with Zaire, Kenya, and Malawi, and the only forces defending the land along the Ugandan border was the 202nd Brigade based in Tabora. Near the frontier was the understrength 3rd Battalion. In early September, the Tanzanians reported unusually large numbers of Ugandan patrols near the border—some equipped with armoured personnel carriers—and a high volume of air reconnaissance flights. By the middle of the month, the Ugandan aircraft began crossing into Tanzanian airspace. The local commanding officer reported the unusual activity to the brigade headquarters in Tabora, and was assured that anti-aircraft guns would be sent to him. These never arrived, and by October the officer's warnings had become increasingly panicked.

=== Initial actions ===
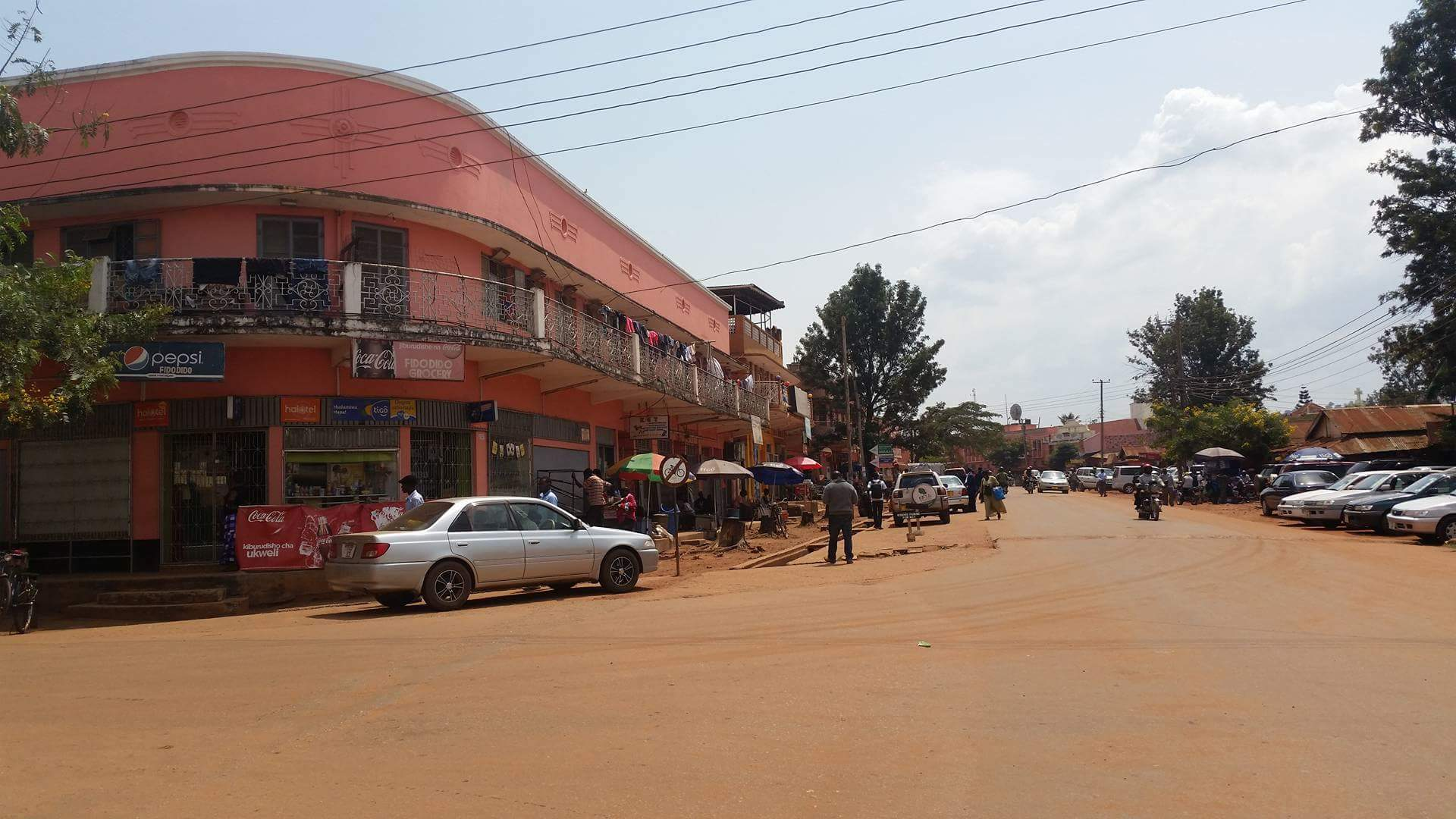
The Uganda Army Air Force repeatedly bombed Bukoba (pictured in 2017) during the early stages of the war.

In the middle of the day on 9 October, Ugandan troops made their first incursion into Tanzania when a motorised detachment moved into Kakunyu and set two houses on fire. Tanzanian artillery retaliated, destroying a Ugandan armoured personnel carrier and a truck, and killing two soldiers. Ugandan artillery returned fire but caused no damage. In the evening Radio Uganda reported that a Tanzanian invasion had been repulsed. The following day, Ugandan MiG fighters bombed Tanzanian forests. Ugandan artillery continuously bombarded Tanzanian territory, so on 14 October, the Tanzanians brought their mortars into action, and the Ugandan guns subsequently stopped firing. Over the next few days, both sides exchanged artillery fire, gradually expanding across the whole border. Tanzanian leaders felt that Amin was only making provocations.

On 18 October, Ugandan MiGs bombed Bukoba, the capital of the West Lake Region. Despite ineffectual Tanzanian anti-aircraft fire, the bombings caused little damage. However, the explosions' reverberations shattered windows and incited the population to panic. In contrast to Tanzania's silence, Radio Uganda reported a Tanzanian "invasion" of Ugandan territory with accounts of fictional battles, and detailed that Tanzanian troops had advanced 15 kilometres (9.3 mi) into Uganda, killing civilians and destroying property. Amin told residents in Mutukula that in spite of the "attack", he still hoped for good relations with Tanzania. At the same time, Radio Uganda's Kinyankole language broadcasts—which were closely monitored and understood by West Lake residents—virulently criticised Nyerere and claimed that Tanzanians wished to fall under Ugandan jurisdiction to escape the former's rule. Meanwhile, the Ugandan regime came under increased internal strain. Dozens of soldiers of the Masaka garrison deemed disloyal were executed, rival government agents got in a shootout in Kampala, and more agents were killed while attempting to arrest a former finance minister.

=== Invasion of Kagera ===
==== Ugandan offensive ====
Uganda occupied the area north of Kagera River, the modern-day Missenyi District (red)

At dawn on 25 October, (Note: According to Ugandan sources, the first major attack took place on 22 October.) Tanzanian observers equipped with a telescope noticed large amounts of Ugandan vehicular activity in Mutukula. Ugandan artillery then opened fire while ground forces advanced. All Tanzanian troops broke and fled under fire except for a platoon which was quickly withdrawn. Over 2,000 Ugandan soldiers under the command of Lieutenant Colonel Marajani, Lieutenant Colonel Butabika, and Colonel Kisuule attacked Kagera. The Ugandan forces were equipped with T-55 and M4A1 Sherman tanks, along with OT-64 SKOT Armoured Personnel Carriers (APC), as well as Alvis Saladin armoured cars, and advanced in two columns under the direct command of Butabika and Kisuule respectively. Despite encountering no or only light resistance, the Ugandan advance was slowed by the terrain, as Butabika's column got stuck in mud near Kabwebwe, and had to wait for hours before being able to get any further.

The Tanzanians began monitoring Ugandan radio frequencies, and were able to overhear transmissions between Marajani and Republic House, the Uganda Army's headquarters in Kampala. Marajani reported heavy resistance despite the fact that all TPDF personnel had withdrawn from the border area. The Tanzanians set up their artillery 10 kilometres (6.2 mi) from the Ugandans and fired several shells, causing them to retreat across the border. (Note: According to Ugandan sources, the first attack on Kagera was repelled after one day had passed.) Throughout the rest of the day, Ugandan MiGs crossed into Tanzanian airspace, where they were harassed by inconsequential anti-aircraft fire. Having been defeated, the Ugandans prepared a new attack.

On 30 October, approximately 3,000 Ugandan troops invaded Tanzania along four routes through Kukunga, Masanya, Mutukula, and Minziro. Commanded by Uganda Army Chief of Staff Yusuf Gowon and equipped with tanks and APCs, they only faced ineffectual rifle fire from several dozen members of the Tanzania People's Militia. Despite the minimal resistance from Tanzanian forces, Ugandan troops advanced with caution. They slowly occupied the Kagera Salient, shooting at soldiers and civilians alike, before reaching the Kagera River and the Kyaka Bridge in the evening. Though the land between the river and Bukoba was left virtually undefended by the TPDF's withdrawal, the Uganda Army halted its advance at the north end of the bridge. The Kagera Salient thus occupied, undisciplined Ugandan soldiers started to loot in the area. Approximately 1,500 civilians were shot and killed, while an additional 5,000 went into hiding in the bush. On 1 November, Radio Uganda announced the "liberation" of the Kagera Salient and declared that the Kagera River marked the new border between Uganda and Tanzania. Amin toured the area and posed for photographs with abandoned Tanzanian war materiel. Ugandan commanders feared that the Kyaka Bridge could be used in a counterattack, so on 3 November a demolitions expert set explosive charges on the crossing and destroyed it.

==== Reactions ====
After initial reports of the 30 October attack reached Dar es Salaam, Nyerere convened a meeting with his advisers and TPDF commanders at his beach residence. He was unsure of his forces' ability to repel the Ugandan invasion, but TPDF Chief Abdallah Twalipo was confident that the army could eject the Ugandans from Tanzania. Nyerere told him to "get started" and the meeting ended. On 31 October, Radio Tanzania declared that Ugandan troops had occupied territory in the northwest portion of the country and that the TPDF was preparing a counterattack. On 2 November, Nyerere declared war on Uganda, saying in a radio broadcast, "We have the reason, we have the resources, and we have the will to fight him [Amin]."

Six African leaders condemned the invasion of Kagera as Ugandan aggression: Mengistu Haile Mariam of Ethiopia, Didier Ratsiraka of Madagascar, Agostinho Neto of Angola, Seretse Khama of Botswana, Samora Machel of Mozambique, and Kenneth Kaunda of Zambia. The governments of Guinea, Mali, Senegal, and several other African states refrained from condemnation, instead calling for a cessation of hostilities and requesting that both sides respect the charter of the OAU. The OAU itself remained neutral on the issue, while representatives of the organisation attempted to mediate between Uganda and Tanzania.

==== Tanzanian counter-attack ====
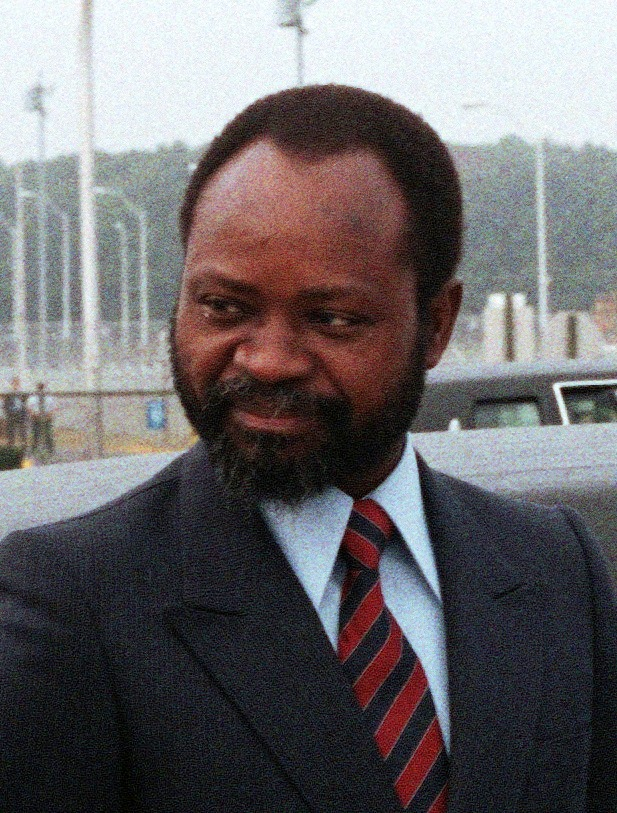
Mozambique under Samora Machel (pictured in 1985) was one of the few countries to aid Tanzania during the war.

Nyerere ordered Tanzania to undertake full mobilisation for war. At the time, the TPDF consisted of four brigades. Among them, only the Southern Brigade, which had just performed well in war games, was ready to be moved to the front line. It was headquartered in Songea, farther from Kagera than the other brigades. After a long trek via rail and road, the unit reached the Bukoba–Kyaka area and established camp. Additional soldiers were sent from Tabora. Prime Minister Edward Sokoine handed orders to Tanzania's regional commissioners to marshal all military and civilian resources for war. In a few weeks, the Tanzanian army was expanded from less than 40,000 troops to over 150,000, including about 40,000 militiamen as well as members of the police, prison services, and the national service. Most of the militiamen were deployed to Tanzania's southern border or sent to guard strategic installations within the country. Mozambican President Machel offered Nyerere the assistance of a Mozambican battalion as a gesture of support. The 800-strong unit was quickly flown to Tanzania and moved to Kagera. (Note: Rumours later emerged of many foreigners, including Egyptians and Cubans, assisting the Tanzanians during the war. The Mozambican soldiers were the only foreigners to serve on Tanzania's behalf. The claims about the presence of foreigners probably stemmed from the diverse ethnic and racial composition of the TPDF.)

In the months before the war's outbreak, the Uganda Army had suffered from extensive purges as well as infighting, and had recruited about 10,000 new troops. According to a Ugandan soldier interviewed by the Drum magazine, the new recruits had little training and were not capable of taking part in actual combat. In addition, the Uganda Army reportedly suffered from extensive defections as late as 1978. Overall, the strength of the Ugandan military was estimated at 20,000 or 21,000 personnel by 1978/79, of which fewer than 3,000 were deployed at the front lines at any given time.

Despite having been informed of the Tanzanian preparations for a counter-offensive, the Ugandan military did not set up any proper defences or entrench their positions. Most of the commanders on the front line and members of the high command ignored the intelligence reports and instead focused on looting the Kagera Salient. Tanzania initially aimed for its counter-offensive, called Operation Chakaza, to begin on 6 November, but it had to be delayed. By the second week of November, it had assembled a substantial force on the southern bank of the Kagera River. TPDF Chief of Staff Major General Tumainie Kiwelu took command of the troops, and the Tanzanians initiated a heavy artillery bombardment of the northern bank, triggering the flight of many Uganda Army soldiers. On 14 November Amin, sensing that other African states did not support his position and irrationally fearing that the Soviet Union was about to give Tanzania new weapons, declared the unconditional withdrawal of all Ugandan troops from Kagera and invited OAU observers to witness it. The Tanzanian government denounced the statement as a "complete lie", while foreign observers were unable to reach a consensus on the veracity of the supposed withdrawal. The OAU reacted by claiming that its mediation had succeeded.

On 19 November, the Tanzanians assembled a pontoon bridge across the Kagera River, and over the following days dispatched patrols into the salient. Ugandan command and control descended into chaos amid the counter-offensive, and only a few officers attempted to organise any resistance. On 23 November, three TPDF brigades crossed the pontoon bridge and began reoccupying the Kagera Salient. The Ugandan government announced in late November that it had withdrawn all forces from the Kagera Salient and that all fighting had ceased. Uganda flew in 50 foreign diplomats to the border, and they reported that there was little evidence of ongoing conflict. Tanzanian officials denounced the withdrawal statement, asserting that Ugandan troops had to be forcibly removed from Tanzanian territory, and announcing that some remained in the country. On 4 December, the TPDF's 206th and Southern Brigades secured Mutukula on the Tanzanian side of the border without incident, while the 207th Brigade retook Minziro. By early January, all Ugandan troops had been ejected from Kagera.

=== Border clashes and Battle of Mutukula ===
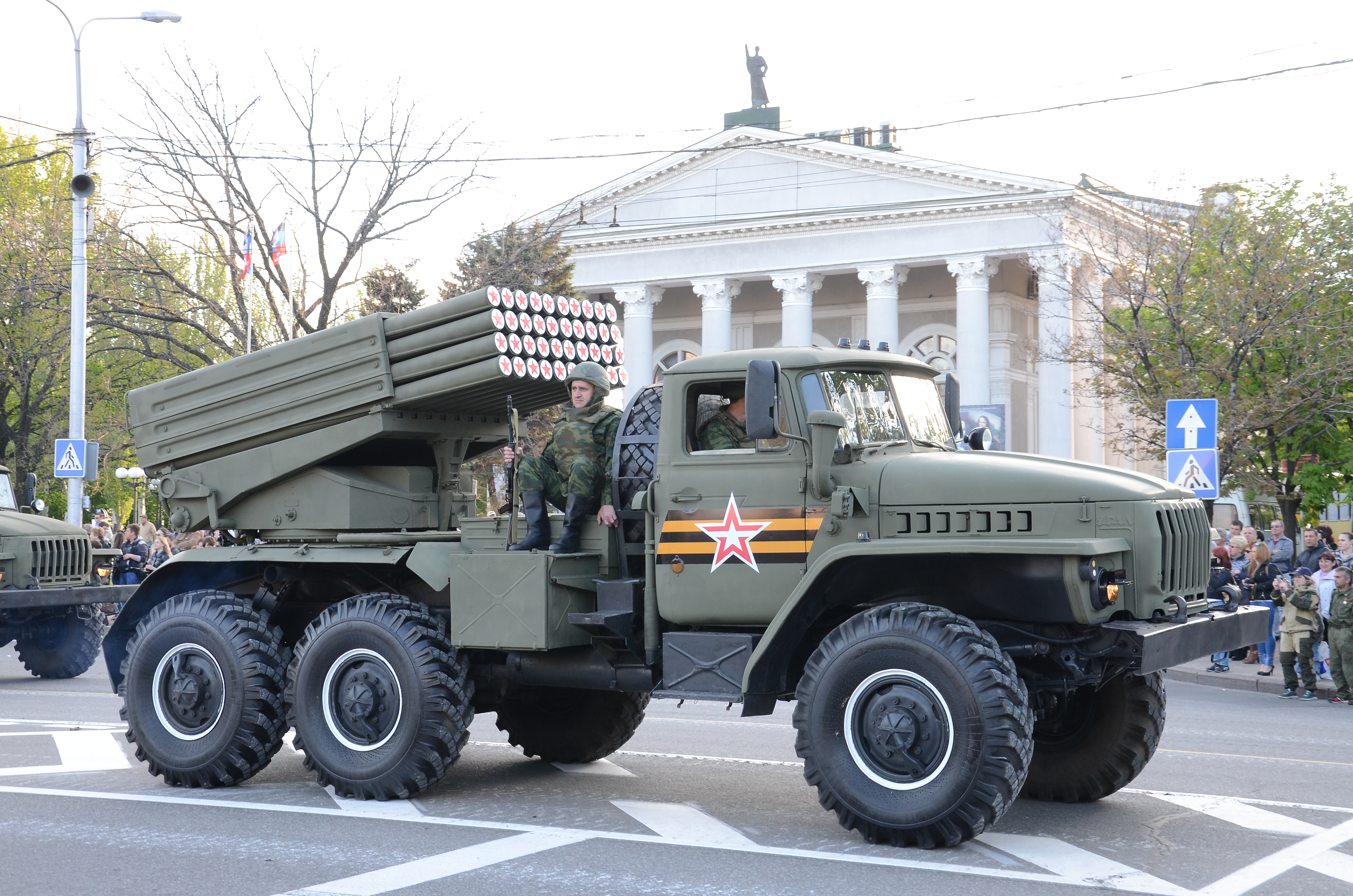
The Tanzania People's Defence Force used BM-21 Grad rocket launchers (example in Russian service pictured) to great effect during the Uganda–Tanzania War.

The morale and discipline of the Uganda Army deteriorated as the Tanzanians pushed it out of Kagera and attacked it along the border. After the invasion was repulsed, the Tanzanians feared that the Uganda Army would try again to seize their territory. Tanzanian commanders felt that as long as Ugandan troops controlled the high ground at Mutukula, Uganda, along the frontier they posed a threat to the salient. Nyerere agreed and ordered his forces to capture the town. While preparing for this operation, the TPDF was preoccupied with training and organising its massively expanded forces. As a result, fighting in December 1978 was mostly limited to "trench warfare" along the border, marked by sporadic clashes and air raids. By this point, militants belonging to the Palestine Liberation Organisation (PLO) were serving alongside the Ugandans at the frontline. The PLO had been allied to Amin's government for years, and about 400 Palestinian fighters were stationed for training in Uganda. These militants were sent to the border to assist the Uganda Army, as the PLO considered the war with Tanzania as a possible threat to their own presence in the region. The journal Africa stated that "informed sources" claimed that "Pakistani technicians and air force personnel" were supporting Amin's forces during the war. About 200–350 Pakistani experts had been stationed in Uganda since early 1978. African Review stated that Saudi Arabia had provided "military assistance" to Amin's government in 1978/79. Amin reportedly travelled to Saudi Arabia twice to ask for financial aid during the Uganda–Tanzania War.

The inactivity at the border led the Ugandan high command to believe that no Tanzanian offensive was imminent, despite reports to the contrary from the frontlines. The Uganda Army was consequently surprised when the TPDF began a large-scale artillery bombardment along the border using BM-21 Grad rocket launchers on 25 December. The Ugandans lacked weaponry which was able to counter the Tanzanian artillery, and were terrified by the destructive capabilities of the BM-21 Grads which they nicknamed "Saba-Saba". The Ugandans' fears were heightened by their initial inability to identify the weapon, until an unexploded rocket was recovered from Lukoma airstrip. The TPDF shelled the border for weeks, demoralising the Ugandans. Attempts by the Uganda Army Air Force to destroy the Tanzanian rocket launchers failed due to effective anti-aircraft fire. Amin dispatched a team of officers to Spain to investigate the purchase of aircraft and napalm bombs to counter the rockets, but ultimately no munitions were acquired. Tanzanian-led troops occupied some minor border settlements near Kikagati on 20 January 1979, prompting Amin to schedule a counter-offensive. The TPDF'S Southern Brigade—renamed the 208th Brigade—finally crossed the border on the night of 21 January and attacked Mutukula the following day. The Ugandan garrison was easily overwhelmed and fled the scene, allowing the Tanzanians to secure Mutukula and capture much abandoned weaponry. The TPDF soldiers proceeded to destroy the entire town and killed several civilians to avenge the pillaging in Kagera. Nyerere was horrified upon being informed, and ordered the TPDF to refrain from harming civilians and property from then on.

The Ugandan government mostly ignored the loss of Mutukula. It sent only the 1st Infantry Battalion to reinforce the frontline, while focusing on celebrating Amin's eighth anniversary as president. This behaviour further demoralised the Ugandan population. The TPDF used the lull in fighting to prepare for further operations, constructing an airstrip at Mutukula and sending additional forces to the border region. As a gesture of support, Mozambique, Zambia, Angola, Ethiopia, and Algeria sent Tanzania small quantities of arms. According to researcher Gerald Chikozho Mazarire, Ethiopia actually sent "troops and Russian ground-to-ground missiles" that assisted Tanzania in fighting Uganda. There were also claims about ZANLA militants fighting alongside the TPDF. The Tanzanian government also asked China for military aid. The latter wanted to stay out of the conflict as far as possible without alienating the Tanzanians. Though the Chinese advised negotiation, they sent a "token" arms shipment and expedited the delivery of some previously ordered equipment. The United Kingdom also wanted nothing to do with the war, but cooperated with the Tanzanians in speedily delivering the non-lethal military supplies they purchased from them. Meanwhile, the Soviet Union stopped shipping arms to Uganda and announced the withdrawal of all of its military advisers. (Note: The Soviet government extended its assurances to Nyerere that no technical assistance would be given to Uganda during the war, though it did dispatch a new military specialist to the country in January 1979.)

=== Mobilisation of Ugandan rebels and exiles ===
Shortly after the invasion of Kagera, Nyerere indicated that with the Mogadishu Agreement being rendered obsolete his government would finance, train, and arm any Ugandans willing to fight to overthrow Amin. A diverse group of exiles responded from across the world as well as opposition members in Uganda. The larger armed rebel movements included Kikosi Maalum, a militia loyal to Obote and commanded by Tito Okello and David Oyite Ojok; the Front for National Salvation (FRONASA) led by Yoweri Museveni; and the Save Uganda Movement (SUM) commanded by Akena p'Ojok, William Omaria, and Ateker Ejalu. In addition, a few smaller groups including the Catholic Group and the Uganda Nationalist Organization claimed to have armed wings.

These groups were very weak at the conflict's start, but rapidly expanded later on. (Note: By late 1978, Kikosi Maalum numbered 600 fighters, FRONASA had 30 militants, SUM was split into two factions, about 100 and 300 strong respectively, and the Uganda Nationalist Organization included 30 militants.) Although nominally allied, the Ugandan rebels were actually political rivals and operated independently from each other. Whereas Kikosi Maalum and FRONASA contributed frontline troops and guerrillas that acted as auxiliaries and scouts to the TPDF, SUM conducted bombings and raids to destabilise Amin's regime from within. The Zambia-based Uganda Liberation Group (Z) encouraged their members to donate money to support the Tanzanian war effort. Ugandan exiles attempted to organise resistance efforts in Kenya, but Kenyan authorities disrupted these efforts, arresting some guerillas and in a few instances turning them over to the Ugandan government. In January Obote broke his public silence and made an open appeal for Ugandans to revolt, reportedly causing great consternation to Amin's government. In the war's early stages, several rebel factions, including Obote's, FRONASA, and SUM, loosely unified under the umbrella group "National Revolt".

=== Tanzanian invasion of southern Uganda ===
Map of Uganda, showing locations of importance during the initial Tanzanian counter-invasion.

At first, Nyerere only sought to wage war in defence of Tanzanian territory. (Note: Obote disputed this, writing that he met with Nyerere in December 1978 and that the latter told him he wanted to see the TPDF occupy Kampala within three months.) After Amin failed to renounce his claims to Kagera and the OAU failed to condemn the Ugandan invasion, he decided that Tanzanian forces should occupy southern Uganda, specifically the two major towns there: Masaka and Mbarara. The Tanzanians decided to seize them as revenge for the devastation wrought by Ugandan troops in their country and in order to incite a rebellion. Obote assured Nyerere that if the towns were taken a mass uprising against Amin's regime would occur, deposing the government in a few weeks and allowing the Tanzanians to exit the war. Obote was also certain (and Nyerere was partly convinced) that the Uganda Army would disintegrate if Masaka were captured. The Tanzanians began careful planning for an offensive on the two towns. Major General David Musuguri was appointed commander of the TPDF's 20th Division and tasked with overseeing the advance into Uganda. It was originally hoped that the Ugandan rebels could spearhead the attack, but there were only about 1,000 of them, so the Tanzanians had to lead the operation. Between the TPDF's positions and Masaka was a series of locations occupied by Ugandan troops that needed to be cleared out, including the airstrip at Lukoma and various artillery batteries. The 201st, 207th, and 208th Brigades were ordered to clear the way.

The Tanzanians launched their offensive in mid-February. They steadily advanced, killing dozens of Ugandan soldiers, destroying large amounts of their materiel, and seizing the airstrip on 13 February. Meanwhile, Amin claimed that Tanzanian forces and mercenaries had seized a large portion of Ugandan territory. Facing questions from the international community, Tanzania insisted that its troops had only occupied land just over the Ugandan border. Tanzanian diplomats repeated Nyerere's proclamation that "Tanzania does not desire an inch of Ugandan territory" but evaded more specific questions about their troops' movements. While the Tanzanian forces advancing on Masaka were speedily moving forward, the TPDF's 206th Brigade encountered more difficult resistance as it pressed towards Mbarara. The Uganda Army successfully ambushed a battalion from the brigade near Lake Nakivale, killing 24 Tanzanians. This was the TPDF's single largest loss during the war, and thereafter it slowed its offensive. Along the Masaka axis of advance, the TPDF dislodged the garrison of Kalisizo, a town 28 kilometres (17 mi) south of Masaka, inflicting heavy casualties. The Ugandans that retreated to Masaka were in a panicked state and demoralised the troops stationed there. As the Tanzanians pushed through southern Uganda they were cheered on by groups of civilians they passed.

The TPDF proceeded to encircle Masaka on three sides, but were ordered not to move in, as an OAU meeting was convened in Nairobi in an attempt to provide mediation between the belligerents. Ugandan Brigadier Isaac Maliyamungu saw an opportunity for a counter-attack, so his troops launched a number of probes against the Tanzanian positions on 23 February. The TPDF easily repelled the assaults, and that night initiated a large bombardment of Masaka, focusing their fire on the Suicide Battalion's barracks. Most of the garrison subsequently fled, and in the morning the Tanzanians occupied the town. To avenge the destruction caused in Kagera, Tanzanian troops proceeded to raze most of the surviving structures with explosives. On 25 February the TPDF and several dozen Ugandan rebels led by Museveni bombarded Mbarara and, after seizing it, destroyed what buildings remained with dynamite. No mass uprising against Amin materialised. Following the capture of the two towns, the TPDF halted to reorganise. Silas Mayunga was promoted to major general and given charge of a newly formed "Task Force", a unit consisting of the 206th Brigade and the Minziro Brigade, which was to operate semi-autonomously from the 20th Division. While the 20th Division moved out of southeast Uganda and attacked major locations in the country, the Task Force advanced north into western Uganda in the following months, engaging Ugandan troops conducting rearguard defensive actions. Meanwhile, the Uganda Army Air Force had suffered such heavy losses during operations in February that it was effectively eliminated as a fighting force.

=== Libyan intervention and Battle of Lukaya ===
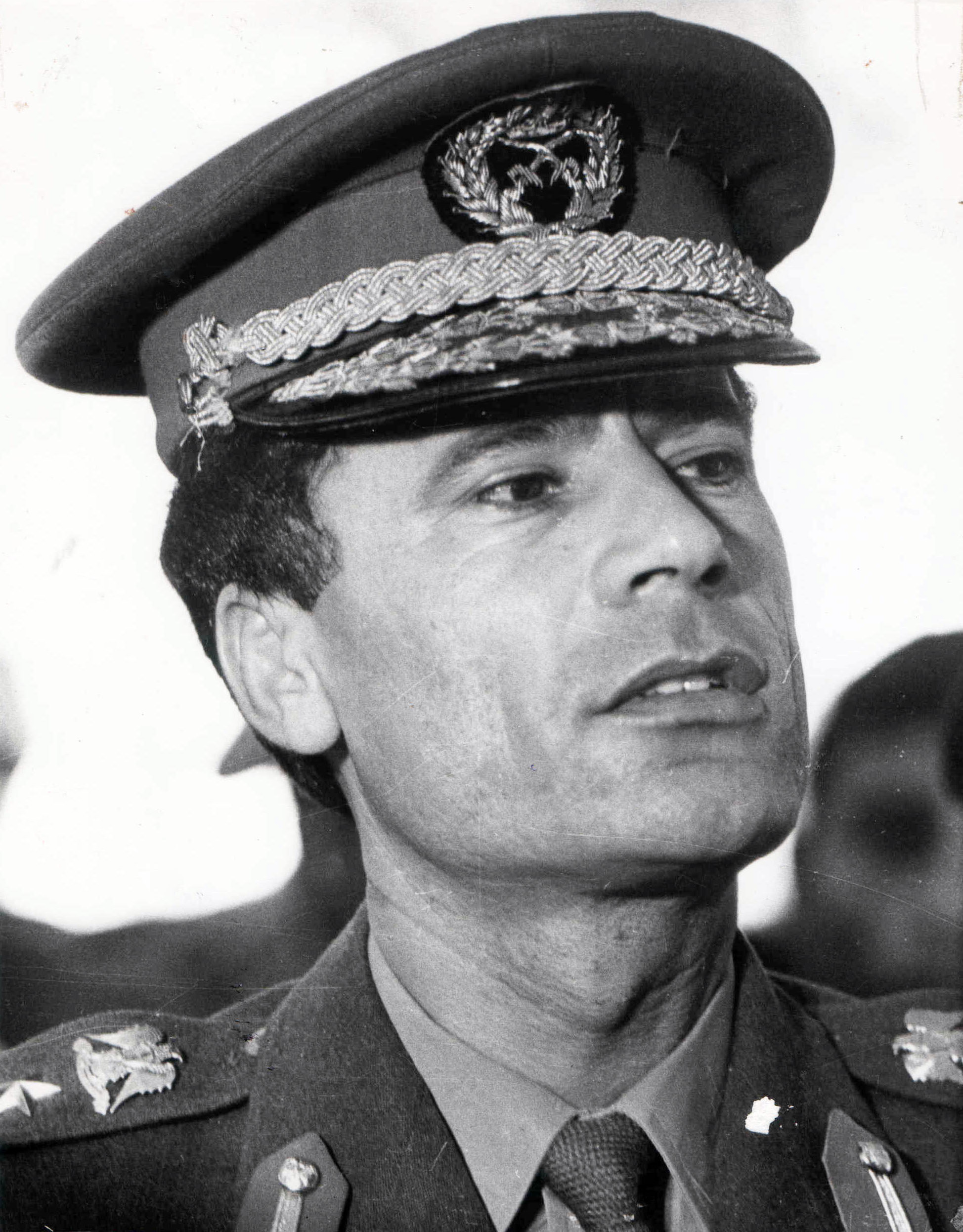
Libyan leader Muammar Gaddafi (pictured) supplied Uganda with troops and materiel during the war.

Libyan leader Muammar Gaddafi, an ally of Amin, felt that Uganda—a Muslim state in his view—was being threatened by a Christian army, and wished to halt the Tanzanians. He also felt that Uganda under Amin served as a crucial counterbalance in northeast Africa to Sudan and Egypt, which had strained relations with Libya. Libyan mediation attempts in November 1978 and February 1979 failed to bring about any resolution between Tanzania and Uganda. Gaddafi reportedly decided to initiate a military intervention without consulting other Libyan officials and over the objections of his army commander, Major Farak Suleiman. In mid-February, Libyan troops were flown into Entebbe to assist the Uganda Army, though in early March the Libyan government denied that its forces were being sent to Uganda. (Note: The Observer reported that Libyan troops and arms were being sent to aid Amin as early as 12 November 1978. In the same month, the Tanzanians claimed that they had captured Libyan radio technicians during Operation Chakaza. About 300 to 400 Libyan soldiers had been "normally" stationed in the country before the war. There were also reports of Moroccan troops being sent to Amin's aid in 1979 which were strongly denied by the Moroccan government. According to researcher Muwonge Magembe, Amin requested assistance from King Hassan II through President Mobutu Sese Seko of Zaire, but the United States Central Intelligence Agency and the United Kingdom Secret Intelligence Service sabotaged his appeal. Researcher Amii Omara-Otunnu also stated that Zaire sent troops to aid Uganda against Tanzania.) Meanwhile, the PLO high command had assessed that Amin's government was under imminent threat due to the Tanzanian military victories. Chairman Yasser Arafat, and top aides Khalil al-Wazir and Saad Sayel discussed their options, and resolved to send more PLO forces to Uganda in order to protect Amin's regime. Colonel Mutlaq Hamdan, alias "Abu Fawaz", and a few other commanders were sent as the first batch of reinforcements to help the Ugandan high command with organising the war. On 18 March, Arafat confirmed that there were Palestinian guerrillas fighting on Amin's behalf in Uganda.

Meanwhile, the TPDF's 20th Division prepared to advance from Masaka to Kampala. The only road from Masaka to Kampala passed through Lukaya, a town 39 kilometres (24 mi) to the north of the former. From there, the route continued on a 25-kilometre (16 mi) causeway that went through a swamp until it reached Nabusanke. The swamp was impassable for vehicles, and the destruction of the causeway would delay a Tanzanian attack on Kampala for months. Though the TPDF would be vulnerable on the passage, Musuguri ordered his troops to secure it. The TPDF's 207th Brigade was dispatched through the swamp to the east, the 208th Brigade was sent west to conduct a wide sweep that would bring it around the northern end of the swamp, and the 201st Brigade bolstered by a battalion of Ugandan rebels was to advance up the road directly into the town. Also as part of the plan to take Kampala, the TPDF's 205th Brigade was to advance on Mpigi in early March and then to Mityana and launch an attack on the capital from there. Amin made a radio broadcast, boasting that his forces were about to surround the TPDF. Curious as to whether the claim had any merit, Tanzanian commanders analysed their plans and realised that the Tiger Regiment at Mubende was unaccounted for. Believing the unit was heading south, they dispatched the 205th Brigade from its position in Masaka north to intercept it. The 205th Brigade encountered entrenched Uganda Army troops in Sembabule, marking the beginning of a three-week-long battle.

Meanwhile, a plan to destroy the Lukaya causeway was presented to Amin in Kampala, but he rejected it, saying that it would inhibit his army's ability to launch a counteroffensive against the Tanzanians. He also believed that with Libyan support the TPDF would soon be defeated, and thus destroying and then rebuilding the causeway later would be unnecessary. On 2–4 March, the Uganda Army defeated a rebel attack during the Battle of Tororo, heartening Amin. Along with his commanders' urgings, the victory at Tororo persuaded the President to order a counter-offensive. On 9 March over 1,000 Libyan troops and about 40 PLO guerrillas belonging to Fatah were flown into Uganda. The Libyan force included regular units, sections of the People's Militia, and members of the Pan-African Legion. They were accompanied by 15 T-55 tanks, over a dozen armoured personnel carriers, multiple Land Rovers equipped with 106 mm (4.2 in) recoilless rifles, one dozen BM-21 Grad 12-barrel Katyusha rocket launcher variants, and other large artillery pieces, such as 122 mm (4.8 in) mortars and two batteries of D-30 howitzers. Over the course of the war, a total of 4,500 Libyan troops were deployed in Uganda. Amin ordered the Libyans, together with some Ugandan troops and PLO guerrillas, to recapture Masaka.

Libyan troop movements before and after the Battle of Lukaya

On the morning of 10 March, the TPDF's 201st Brigade occupied Lukaya to await crossing the causeway the next day. In the late afternoon the Ugandan-Libyan-Palestinian force began its advance toward Lukaya, with orders to take Masaka within three hours. Upon seeing the Tanzanians, the Libyans initiated a barrage of Katyusha rockets. The artillery overshot them, but the mostly inexperienced Tanzanian soldiers of the 201st Brigade were frightened, and many of them broke rank and fled. The rest quickly withdrew into the swamp along the Masaka road after seeing the Libyan T-55s and Ugandan M4A1 Sherman tanks advancing toward them. Despite its orders to recapture Masaka, the Ugandan-Libyan-Palestinian force halted in Lukaya.

Tanzanian commanders decided to alter their plans to prevent the loss of Lukaya from turning into a debacle. The 208th Brigade under Brigadier Mwita Marwa, which was 60 kilometres (37 mi) north-west of the town, was ordered to reverse course and as quickly as possible cut off the Ugandans and Libyans from Kampala. The 208th Brigade reached its flanking position at the Kampala road at dawn on 11 March and began the counter-attack. The regrouped 201st Brigade attacked from the front and the 208th from behind, thereby putting great pressure on the Ugandan-Libyan-Palestinian force. Precisely aimed Tanzanian artillery fire devastated their ranks. Most of the Libyans subsequently began to retreat. The Ugandan commander at the battle, Lieutenant Colonel Godwin Sule, was killed, possibly by being accidentally run over by one of his tanks. His death prompted the collapse of the Ugandan command structure, and the remaining Ugandan troops abandoned their positions and fled. After the battle, the Tanzanians counted over 400 dead enemy soldiers in the area, including about 200 Libyans. The Battle of Lukaya was the largest engagement of the Uganda–Tanzania War.

Following the Battle of Lukaya, the Uganda Army began to completely collapse. Shortly thereafter, the TPDF launched Operation Dada Idi, and in the following days the 207th and 208th Brigades cleared the Kampala road and captured Mpigi. Ugandan and Libyan troops fled away from the front line towards the capital. Amin dismissed Gowon from his position as chief of staff, and facing the hostility of resentful troops Gowon fled to Zaire. He was replaced by Ali Fadhul. In early April the TPDF captured Sembabule, marking the end of the longest battle of the war. The supply of many Uganda Army units collapsed, resulting in a lack of ammunition, fuel, and provisions. Many Ugandan soldiers went rogue, pillaging, murdering and raping as they fled into Zaire and Sudan. According to researcher Alicia C. Decker, the deserters' behaviour was not just motivated by the collapse of discipline, but also strategic considerations: by spreading chaos and causing civilians to flee, they gained better cover for their own retreat. Those soldiers who stayed at their posts often began to carry out revenge attacks on those suspected of rebel sympathies, terrorising, abusing and executing people without due process. Realising that the war was lost, other members of the Uganda Army plotted to overthrow Amin. Rumours circulated about members of the President's inner circle being involved in these coup plans. At this point, most Ugandan civilians were opposed to Amin's government and hoped for a quick end of the war. They began calling the Tanzanians bakombozi ("liberators").

=== Moshi Conference ===
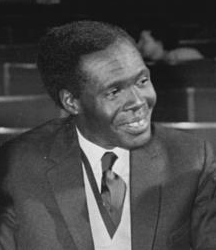
Despite his prominent role in the Ugandan rebel movement, Milton Obote (pictured) was convinced by President Nyerere to refrain from attending the Moshi Conference.

Following the capture of Mpigi, Nyerere ordered the TPDF to halt its advance. Though he felt that after the Libyan intervention at Lukaya it was no longer possible to count on the Ugandan rebels being able to capture Kampala by themselves, he believed that it was highly important they should be given time to organise their own government to succeed Amin. Tanzanian officials began making preparations for the establishment of a new government as did the Ugandan rebels, led by Obote and Dani Wadada Nabudere in their own respective circles. (Note: Obote maintained that the conference was his idea.) The rebels and exiles had been preparing for this for several months, making contact with one another since the outbreak of the war. While discussions among the factions were underway, Museveni proposed that his FRONASA—purportedly larger due to recruitment efforts around Mbarara—unite with Obote's Kikosi Maluum to form a unified army. Obote rejected the suggestion and tried to unify his forces with other armed groups, but Museveni's idea gained traction with other exile leaders. As the Tanzanians began organising a conference for the rebels and exiles, Nyerere was reconsidering Obote's role in the movement. He did not want to give the impression that Tanzania was going to install a government of its own choice in Uganda by facilitating Obote's assumption of leadership of the rebel movement, and there was hostility to Obote from the Baganda people in southern Uganda as well as other countries such as Kenya. Nyerere also feared that Obote would stifle cooperation at the meeting and cause it to break up without success. He convinced Obote to refrain from attending and instead send a delegation from the Uganda People's Congress, Obote's political party. In place of Obote, many Ugandan exiles began favouring Yusuf Lule, a retired Muganda academic and political moderate.

The conference opened on 24 March in the Tanzanian town of Moshi, following an intense debate over which factions and persons could be admitted. That afternoon the delegates announced the formation of the Uganda National Liberation Front (UNLF), which was to be governed by a 30-strong National Consultative Committee (NCC) and an 11-strong National Executive Committee, the latter including three special commissions—Finance and Administration, Political and Diplomatic Affairs, and Military Affairs. The next two days were spent debating the balance of power among the governing bodies and the selection of a chairman for the organisation, which was hotly contested between Lule and Paulo Muwanga. After heated argument a consensus was reached whereby Lule would be given the chair and Muwanga would be made head of the Military Affairs Commission. The conference dissolved on 26 March 1979. The armed rebel militias represented in Moshi were united as the Uganda National Liberation Army (UNLA). The unified rebel force was initially about 2,000 fighters strong.

=== Fall of Kampala and end of the war ===
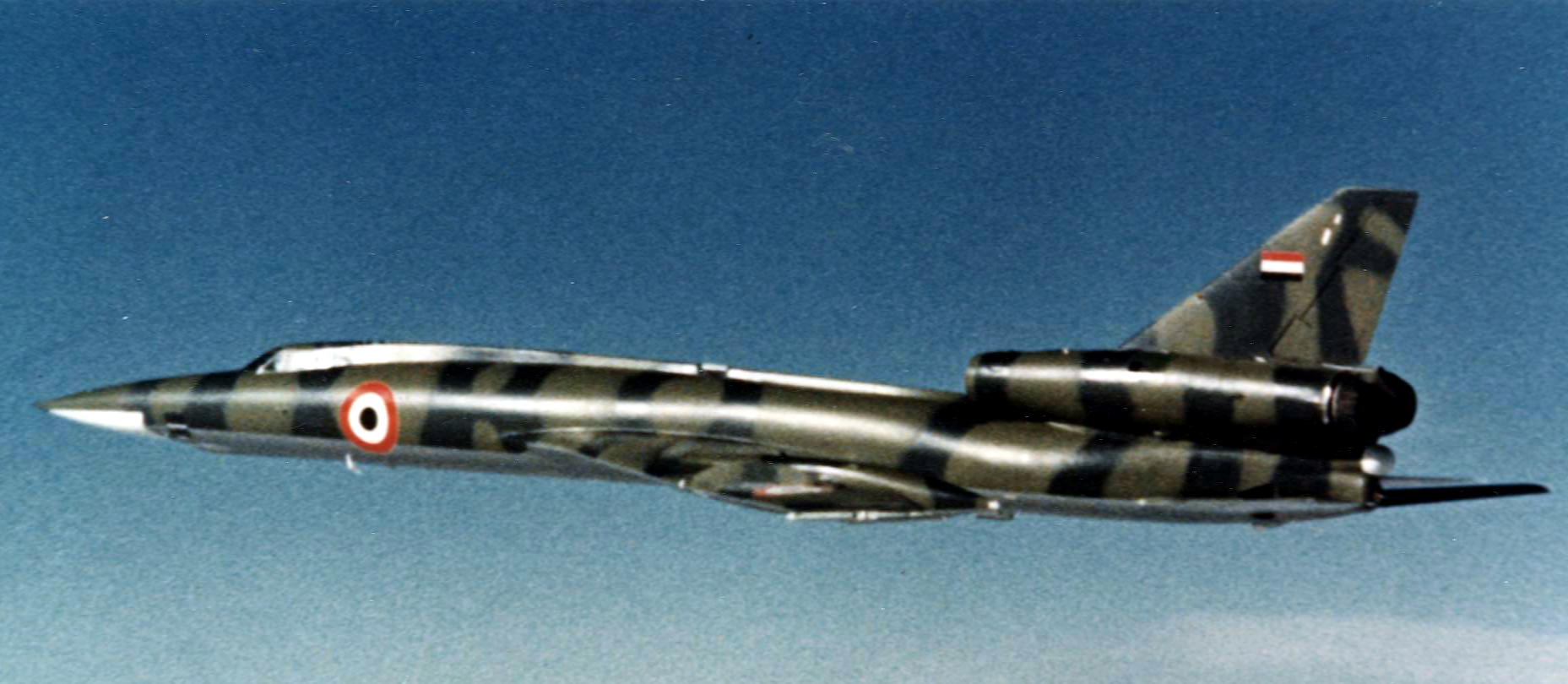
Libyan Tupolev Tu-22 bomber in 1977

The day after the closing of the Moshi Conference, the Libyan ambassador to Tanzania passed Nyerere a note from Gaddafi, which threatened Libyan military involvement on Amin's behalf if Tanzania did not withdraw its troops from Ugandan territory in 24 hours. Nyerere was surprised by the ultimatum, since he knew that Libyan soldiers had fought with the Ugandans at Lukaya. He broadcast a message over radio, declaring that while Gaddafi's threat added "new dimensions" to the war, it did not alter Tanzania's view of Amin. Four days later Gaddafi, in an attempt to intimidate Nyerere, ordered a Tupolev Tu-22 bomber to attack a fuel depot in Mwanza. The bomber missed its target and instead struck a game reserve. Tanzanian jets retaliated by attacking fuel depots in Kampala, Jinja, and Tororo.

In early April, Tanzanian forces began to concentrate their efforts on weakening the Ugandan position in Kampala. By this point, the Uganda Army had mostly disintegrated. Diplomats believed that only the soldiers of Nubian and Sudanese origin remained loyal, while Amin's regime held onto power thanks to the Libyan support. The New York Times reporter John Darnton estimated that just 2,500 Uganda Army soldiers remained loyal. Tanzanian commanders had originally assumed that Amin would station the bulk of his remaining forces in the capital, and their initial plans called for a direct attack on the city. But from the high ground in Mpigi they could see the Entebbe peninsula, where there was a high volume of Libyan air traffic and a large contingent of Ugandan and Libyan soldiers. If the TPDF seized Kampala before securing the town of Entebbe, TPDF positions in Kampala would be vulnerable to a flanking attack. Taking Entebbe would cut off Uganda's Libyan reinforcements and permit an assault on the capital from the south. Thus, Musuguri ordered the 208th Brigade to seize the peninsula. The TPDF set up artillery and subjected the town to a light, three-day bombardment. Amin was at the Entebbe State House at the time but fled via helicopter to Kampala. His departure instigated the flight of many Ugandan troops, but the Libyans remained.

[The Libyans] were all over, and they didn't know where they were going. They didn't know where Kampala was... so they just ran anyhow. [...] And they were killed. People would find them... and then they would shout that "they are here" and they would at times close them in the house and kill them.

— Jane Walusimbi, a Ugandan farmer, describing how civilians treated Libyan soldiers during the Battle of Entebbe

On 6 April, the bombardment was intensified, with several hundred artillery rounds fired. The 208th Brigade advanced on Entebbe the following morning. A single Libyan convoy attempted to escape down the Kampala road but was ambushed and destroyed. By the afternoon the TPDF had secured the town, seizing large stockpiles of Libyan weapons. The next morning, hundreds of Uganda Army Air Force personnel surrendered to the TPDF. The battle marked the de facto end of the Uganda Army Air Force. Most of its aircraft were destroyed or captured, and the air force personnel that managed to escape to the air fields in Jinja and Nakasongola spread panic among the Ugandan forces there. Mass desertions and defections resulted. Nyerere decided to allow the Libyan forces, who had suffered heavily during the battle, to flee Kampala and quietly exit the war without further humiliation. He sent a message to Gaddafi explaining his decision, saying that the Libyan troops could be airlifted out of Uganda unopposed from the airstrip in Jinja. (Note: According to the German newspaper Der Spiegel, the Libyan government bribed the Tanzanians with $20 million to keep the corridor open.) Many fleeing Libyans were targeted by Ugandan civilians who misled them, betrayed them to the TPDF or outright murdered them. The survivors mostly withdrew to Kenya and Ethiopia, from where they were repatriated. The defeat of Libyan troops in Uganda was a serious setback for Gaddafi's foreign policy, and reportedly caused conflict within the Libyan government.

The TPDF advanced into Kampala on 10 April. Few Ugandan or Libyan units resisted; the greatest problem for the Tanzanian troops was a lack of maps of the city. On the following day, while Tanzanian and UNLF troops were mopping up the remaining Ugandan forces in Kampala, Oyite-Ojok went to Radio Uganda to declare the city's capture. He stated in a broadcast that Amin's government was deposed and that Kampala was under the control of the UNLF, and appealed to residents to remain calm and for Ugandan soldiers to surrender. Civilians came out from their homes to celebrate and engaged in destructive looting. On 13 April Lule was flown into the city and installed as the new President of Uganda. The new UNLF government was quickly recognised by other states as the legitimate authority in Uganda. It was greatly hampered in establishing itself by the lack of an effective police force or civil service and the looting of equipment from offices. The government played no meaningful role in the succeeding military operations against Amin's forces.

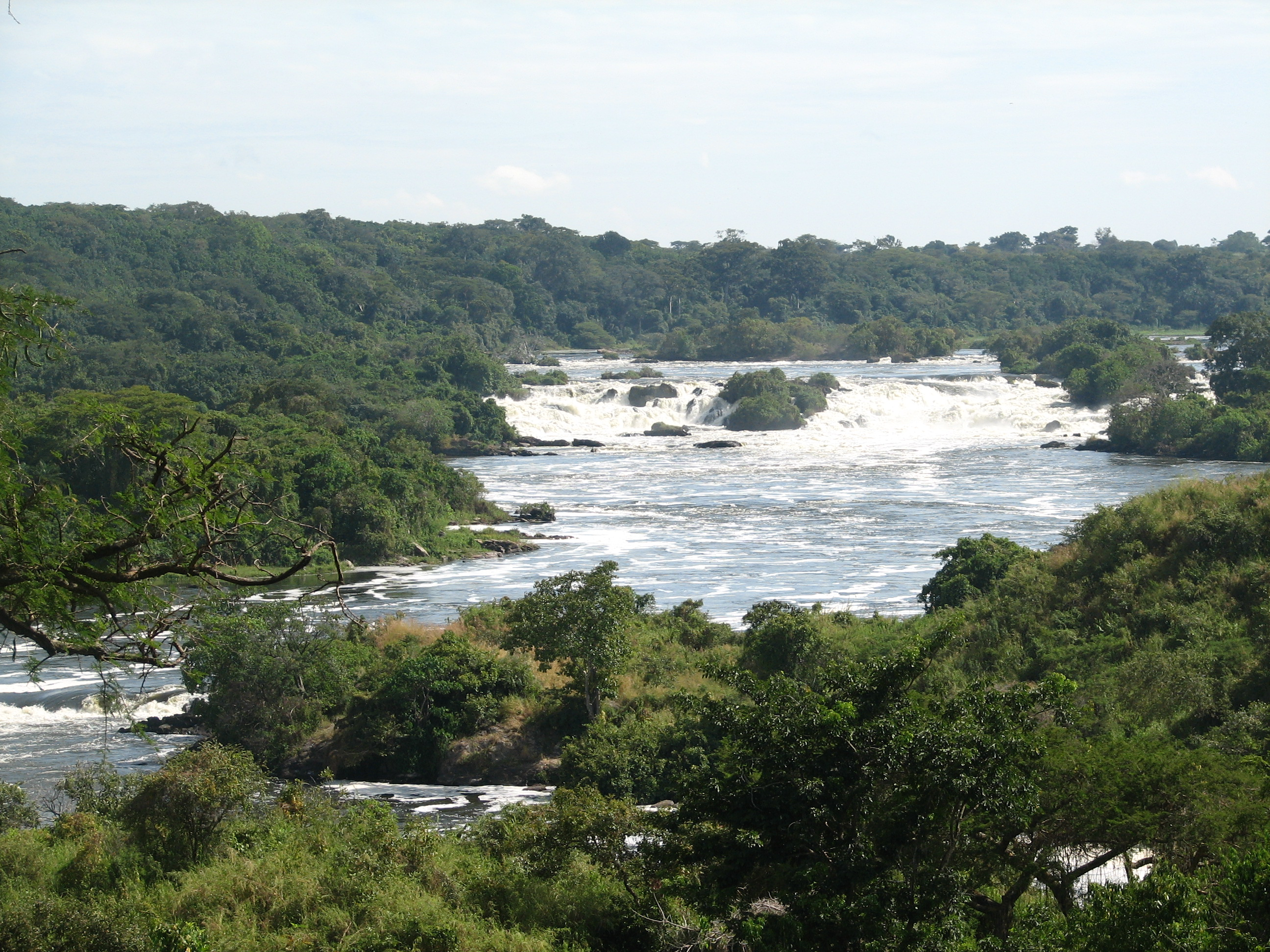
The Karuma Falls of the Nile River (pictured in 2006) were one of the last places where the Uganda Army offered resistance to the TPDF.

Amin fled, first to Libya and later to Saudi Arabia. Despite the flight of Amin and the fall of the capital, scattered and disjointed remnants of the Ugandan military continued to resist. With Libyan support, these loyalists retreated into the north, pillaging as they did so. They were accompanied by PLO militants under the command of Mahmoud Da'as who eventually crossed into Sudan. After Kampala's capture, little further damage was caused by the fighting. On 22 April, the TPDF seized the town of Jinja and the Owen Falls Dam intact, which provided all the electricity in the country. Most units of the Uganda Army mutinied or dispersed, allowing the Tanzanian-UNLF troops to occupy most of eastern and northern Ugandan without opposition. A few Ugandan units offered firm resistance along the western border, but these were also overcome. Attempts by Amin's loyalists to block the Tanzanian northward advance were defeated during the Battle of Bombo, the Battle of Lira, and the Battle of Karuma Falls. In Mbale, 250 Ugandan troops defected and chose to defend the town from retreating loyalists and await the arrival of the Tanzanians. A large number of civilians armed themselves and attacked Ugandan stragglers, and all those belonging to ethnic or religious groups who were associated with Amin's regime. Mobs destroyed entire communities. The worst massacres were carried out by Ugandan rebels belonging to FRONASA and Kikosi Maalum. In many cases, Tanzanian soldiers condoned and even aided lynchings of Ugandan soldiers at the hands of vengeful civilians. Regardless, most sources concur that the Tanzanians behaved relatively well, especially in comparison to Ugandan rebels and tribal militants.

The last battle of the war occurred on 27 May when a band of Ugandan troops fired on elements of the TPDF's Task Force near Bondo before fleeing. The Task Force shortly thereafter seized Arua without facing resistance. Upon entering the West Nile region, FRONASA launched a "systematic extermination" of the local population, assisted by vigilantes belonging to anti-Amin tribes. A significant portion of West Nile's civilian population consequently fled into exile along with the remnants of the Uganda Army. From Arua a Tanzanian brigade advanced to Uganda's western border with Sudan and Zaire. It secured the Sudanese frontier on 3 June 1979, thus ending the war. By that time a total of 30,000–45,000 TPDF personnel were deployed in Uganda.

The TPDF lost 373 soldiers over the course of the war, and of these only 96 were killed in the fighting. About 150 Ugandan rebels died, most of whom died when one of their boats accidentally capsized in Lake Victoria. About 1,000 Uganda Army soldiers were killed while 3,000 were taken prisoner. At least 600 Libyan soldiers were killed during the war, and about 1,800 were wounded. The Tanzanians took 59 Libyan prisoners, and released them several months after the end of the war. Several PLO fighters were killed during the conflict, though their number remains disputed. The PLO admitted to losing twelve fighters in Uganda, counting the dead and those missing in action. In contrast, Tanzanian officers claimed that 200 Palestinians had been killed during the conflict. One Pakistani national was also captured by the TPDF with the Libyan forces, and released after the war. About 1,500 Tanzanian civilians were killed by the Uganda Army in Kagera. According to Avirgan and Honey, about 500 Ugandan civilians were killed by all belligerents. Others have reported far higher civilian casualties in Uganda. According to Indian diplomat Madanjeet Singh, Uganda Army soldiers began killing Ugandan and expatriate civilians at random after the war started, and within the month of February 1979 over 500 people were murdered. A.B.K. Kasozi stated that thousands were murdered by retreating Amin loyalists in March and April 1979, while Ogenga Otunnu has argued that anti-Amin insurgents also killed thousands in the West Nile region during the conflict's last stages.

== Media and propaganda ==
During the early stages of the war in October 1978, Radio Tanzania broadcast no news on the conflict while Radio Uganda reported erroneously on an attempted Tanzanian invasion and intense border clashes. Once the invasion of Kagera was made public, Radio Tanzania launched an intensive propaganda campaign to gather public support of the war by retelling stories of the atrocities committed in Tanzanian territory and portraying the Ugandan attack as an egotistical venture by Amin to bolster his self-image. Radio Tanzania and Radio Uganda quickly became entangled in a "radio war", each making allegations against the other's country. In the first few months the Tanzanian public was offered little official information aside from a few speeches delivered by Nyerere. The Tanzanian government quickly established an "Information Committee" to manage news about the war. The body was chaired by the top secretary in the Ministry of Information, George Mhina, and consisted of the editors of Tanzania's two state newspapers, the head of Radio Tanzania, Presidential Press Secretary Sammy Mdee, and representatives of the TPDF and security forces. Mhina began repressing news about the war so that while many Tanzanian journalists and photographers had gone to the front lines, little of their reporting was ever published. Mdee and the newspaper editors boycotted the committee's meetings in protest. In general, the press in Tanzania was allowed to publish what it wished within the law, but it rarely reported anything different from the official media and often reprinted press releases from the government news agency, Shirika la Habari Tanzania (SHIHATA).

In war propaganda we were not good. It's important to inform the population or else they become terrorised. I realise now that the people must be told more. In this case our enemy had verbal diarrhea.

— Nyerere's reflection on the Tanzanian propaganda effort after the war

In response to the suppression of information, Tanzanian citizens began listening to foreign broadcasts from BBC Radio, Voice of America, Voice of Kenya, Radio South Africa, and Radio Uganda for reporting on the conflict. In Dar es Salaam, civilians went to the Kilimanjaro Hotel to view the news carried through on the establishment's Reuters telex machine. The Information Committee eventually had the unit deactivated. Radio Tanzania spent the duration of the war broadcasting dramatic news reports, songs, and poems about the conflict as well as praise for the TPDF. Announcers fluent in Ugandan languages were hired and their newscasts were directed into Uganda. Ugandan exile Sam Odaka hosted a 45-minute daily propaganda programme on Radio Tanzania that targeted Ugandan soldiers. The show successfully damaged the Uganda Army's morale and ran until Kampala fell. SHIHATA regularly labelled Amin a "fascist".

There was no press freedom in Uganda, and most local media outlets garnered their information from the state-run Uganda News Agency. Amin used official media to communicate with the civilian populace throughout the war and to rhetorically attack Tanzania. Ugandan propaganda—in addition to being biased—was lacking in factual accuracy. It attempted to bolster the image of Idi Amin and raise the Uganda Army's morale by spreading fantastical tales, such as claiming that a Tanzanian unit had been wiped out by crocodiles or that the President could easily defeat 20,000 Tanzanians with just twenty Ugandan soldiers. One of the most notable propagandistic stories spread by pro-Amin media featured the President's wife, Sarah Kyolaba, as she allegedly led a battalion of armed women against the TPDF. No firm proof for the existence of such a unit ever surfaced. Decker speculated that the tales about "Suicide Sarah" were supposed to "feminize the enemy"; instead of actually emphasising the bravery of Ugandan women soldiers, people were supposed to believe that the Tanzanians were so weak that even women could defeat them. The information released by the UNLF was often dubious or outdated. Following the end of the war an employee of Radio Tanzania was put at the disposal of the UNLF government to advise them on how to use public broadcasting to garner public support for rebuilding.

At the beginning of the war, Tanzania brought four journalists to Kagera to prove that Uganda had attacked the area. Thereafter correspondents were not allowed to travel to the war front, making independent confirmation of each belligerents' claims impossible. Journalists often attempted to confirm Ugandan official media by cross-referencing it with Tanzanian news for consistencies. The two exceptions to this rule were Reuters reporters Tony Avirgan and Martha Honey, who had the permission of Nyerere to accompany the TPDF as it invaded Uganda. War correspondent Al J Venter credited Avirgan's access to the frontline to his closeness to the Tanzanian government and his "anti-U.S., anti-Western sentiments", as all other journalists were generally obstructed by the TPDF. Venter noted one incident when a Tanzanian officer outright hit United Press International journalist Ray Wilkinson. Four European journalists that attempted to infiltrate Uganda from Kenya in the middle of the war were shot by Uganda soldiers. Most journalists instead covered the conflict from Kenya, particularly Nairobi. From there they telephoned foreign diplomats in Kampala and, as the war progressed, obtained accounts from local residents.

== Aftermath ==
=== Analyses ===
Sociologist Ronald Aminzade asserted that "the key" to Tanzania's victory was its ideological framing of the war as a threat to the nation, thus facilitating the mobilisation of a popular militia that performed well in combat. Aminzade stated that in contrast Uganda "embarked on a nonideological territorial war", deploying forces that suffered from low morale and internal dissension. Journalist Godwin Matatu reasoned that the Uganda Army's failures rested on its low morale and reliance on vehicles and roads which made them vulnerable to Tanzanian ground forces, who travelled on foot for much of the war. Journalist Anne Abaho concluded that Uganda lost the war due to four key factors: internal tensions and incompetence in the Uganda Army, the Tanzanian deployment of BM-21 Grad rocket launchers and the failure of Uganda to counter them, a lack of military intelligence, and poor coordination with Libya. Venter instead claimed that the TPDF had "the edge" due to an effective sabotage campaign waged by the Save Uganda Movement as well as the "lackluster ability of Amin's main counter-strike force".

War correspondents described the military tactics employed by both sides during the war as mostly unimaginative, with Matt Franjola claiming that it was "almost as if all the officers had carefully studied a 1930 British Infantryman's Handbook. Much of it was so predictable". Some Western military analysts attributed Tanzania's victory to the collapse of the Uganda Army, arguing that the TPDF would have been defeated by most other African armies. Others felt that the TPDF's success indicated substantial improvements in African military capabilities over the previous years. Military analyst William Thom praised the TPDF's ability to successfully deploy its forces over considerable distances. Venter opinioned that even though the TPDF soldiers proved to be "thorough looters", they were "fighters [of] better caliber" than the contemporary Nigerians, Ethiopians, Angolans, and Mozambicans. He credited their successful ambush operations to training by Cubans and East Germans. Intelligence analyst Kenneth M. Pollack attributed Libyan troops' failures to their low morale and lack of military intelligence. Academic Benoni Turyahikayo-Rugyema wrote in 1998 that "Had Amin not invaded the Kagera Salient in Tanzania he probably would still be ruling Uganda."

Several academics have evaluated whether the Tanzanian invasion of Uganda and its effort to depose Amin could be classified as an instance of justified humanitarian intervention. While some writers agree that Tanzania's action was humanitarian in nature, others have disputed such a conclusion, arguing that even if Tanzania fought the war with some humanitarian considerations, it was largely invading Uganda for different reasons. For its own part, the Tanzanian government accused Amin of committing atrocities against his people and stressed that many Ugandans "celebrated" Tanzania's invasion, but it did not justify the war on humanitarian grounds. Instead, it argued that the country had acted in self-defence of its territory and that Amin's regime posed "a turbulent menace to the peace and security of East Africa". Christianity specialist Emmanuel K. Twesigye considered the war "a good example of the 'just war theory' at work". Political scientist Daniel G. Acheson-Brown concluded that, according to just war theory as espoused by Michael Walzer's Just and Unjust Wars, Tanzania's invasion of Uganda was justified on humanitarian grounds to overthrow a brutal dictatorship. Acheson-Brown also noted that the Uganda Army committed "an overwhelming number of atrocities" during the conflict and that Tanzania made "some significant violations of the proper conduct of war", particularly when the TPDF destroyed Mutukula. Walzer also considered the war a case of justified intervention. Legal scholar Noreen Burrows wrote that while Tanzania's attack on Uganda violated strictly construed international law, it was justified by moral and political arguments. International law scholar Sean D. Murphy characterised Tanzania's invasion of Uganda as "one of mixed reasons of self-defense and protection of human rights". Belgium later cited the Uganda–Tanzania War as an example of justified intervention when explaining its decision to join the North Atlantic Treaty Organization's intervention in the Kosovo War.

=== International political controversy ===
The overthrow of a sovereign head of state by a foreign military had never occurred in post-colonial Africa and was strongly discouraged by the OAU. At an OAU conference in July 1979, President Gaafar Nimeiry of Sudan said that the Uganda–Tanzania War had set a "serious precedent" and noted that the organisation's charter "prohibits interference in other people's internal affairs and invasion of their territory by armed force." Nigerian Head of State Olusegun Obasanjo shared similar concerns. Some observers dissented from this line of thought and argued that the situation demonstrated that the OAU charter needed reform. Nyerere accused the OAU of shielding black African leaders from criticism, noting that Amin's regime had killed more people than the white minority governments in southern Africa. He also circulated a "Blue Book" published by the Tanzanian government, which argued that Tanzania's role in the war was justified by Uganda's attack on the Kagera Salient and Libya's armed intervention, which would have prevented the Ugandan rebels from overthrowing Amin themselves. President Godfrey Binaisa, Lule's successor, praised the Tanzanian intervention. Most Western states cautiously avoided commenting on Tanzania's role in deposing Amin, though British Foreign Secretary David Owen declared that he was pleased with the end of Amin's rule. According to academics Roy May and Oliver Furley, the overthrow of the regime was "tacitly" accepted by the international community, as indicated by the speed with which they recognised the UNLF government that replaced it.

=== Uganda ===
The war with Tanzania caused great economic damage to Uganda, as price gouging of commodities surged and inflation rapidly increased. The movement of armed forces throughout Uganda in 1979 disrupted the planting season, leading to inflated prices for staple crops such as bananas, sweet potatoes, and cassava, and causing famine in some regions. Despite this disruption, rural areas were mostly physically undisturbed by the fighting, which was concentrated in other areas. An estimated minimum of 100,000 Ugandans were made homeless by the conflict. Severe social unrest also followed the war. With Amin ousted, different groups of political and ethnic rivals started to compete and fight for power. It also triggered a resurgence of crime as bandits—known as "kondos" and armed with guns that had belonged to the TPDF, Ugandan rebels, and Amin's security forces—took advantage of the disorder to rob and loot. Political assassinations became commonplace and Kampala remained plagued by violence until 1981, facilitated by the lack of effective courts and police which had languished under Amin's regime. Rural areas avoided the worst violence, as traditional norms provided some basis for order. In addition, the conflict resulted in a growth of illegal poaching across the country, leading to substantial environmental damage.

The TPDF remained in Uganda to maintain peace, and subsequently Tanzanian soldiers fathered a large number of Ugandan children. Many TPDF soldiers married Ugandan women and brought them back to Tanzania. Some residents in southern Uganda believed that Tanzanian soldiers brought HIV/AIDS into the region and spread it by having sex with civilians. Over time many Ugandans grew tired of the Tanzanian occupation. Meanwhile, remnants of Amin's Uganda Army reorganised in Zaire and Sudan, and invaded Uganda in autumn 1980, starting a civil war which became later known as the Ugandan Bush War. More TPDF personnel died during the occupation of Uganda than during the Uganda–Tanzania War. The last Tanzanian occupation troops left Uganda in October 1981. Tanzanian military advisers remained in the country as late as 1984.

Uganda was embroiled in a political crisis almost immediately after the UNLF took power. Lule disregarded the Moshi Conference agreements stipulating a weak presidential authority and attempted to assert his ability to operate under stronger powers provided by the constitution operative in Uganda before Amin's coup. He also distrusted the UNLA, which he considered to be made up of loyal Obote and Museveni partisans. Meanwhile, Museveni and Oyite-Ojok both attempted to stack the army with their own supporters. Lule's refusal to consult the NCC about ministerial appointments provoked outrage in the committee, and on 20 June 1979 it voted to remove him from office. Godfrey Binaisa, the former Attorney General of Uganda under Obote who had come to oppose both him and Amin and had no prior role in the committee, was then elected president. Lule's ouster instigated large protests in Kampala and clashes between demonstrators and Tanzanian troops attempting to maintain order. Nyerere announced that he would offer continued support to Uganda as long as it retained a unified and uncorrupted government. Over the following month large numbers of TPDF troops were withdrawn and political violence around Kampala increased. In November Binaisa began to fear that Muwanga—then serving as a minister in the government—was preparing to return Obote to power, and considered dismissing him from his post. At Obote's advice, Muwanga publicly declared that Obote had no interest in regaining the presidency and would back Binaisa in the next national election. As Obote and Muwanga intended, Binaisa felt assured by the guarantee and instead removed Obote's rival, Museveni, from his post as Minister of Defence. The situation in Uganda declined further as Tanzanian troops clashed with civilians, unofficial militias were raised, and Binaisa focused on using his office to enrich himself. In 1980 Binaisa attempted to strip Oyite-Ojok of his post as Chief of Staff of the UNLA. This infuriated many Ugandan soldiers, and Muwanga and Oyite-Ojok, with Museveni's approval, began moving to oust Binaisa. On 12 May the NCC's Military Affairs Commission announced that it was assuming the responsibilities of the presidency. Nyerere refused to intervene, fearing clashes between the TPDF and UNLA.

Obote soon returned to Uganda and began reorganising the UPC in preparation for general elections, which were to be held on 10 December. Assisted in part by irregularities in the process, the UPC won the parliamentary elections and formed a government with Obote as president. In February 1981 Museveni, denouncing the elections, organised a small band of rebels and began attacking UNLA forces, thus entering the civil war. Shortly thereafter they co-founded a new rebel coalition, the National Resistance Movement. Museveni overthrew the Ugandan government in 1986 and became president.

=== Tanzania ===
The outbreak of the war came at a time when Tanzania's economy was showing signs of recovery from a severe drought in 1974–1975. All planned government projects were suspended in every ministry except Defence, and the administration was instructed not to fill vacancies. Nyerere stated in January 1979 that the TPDF operation to expel the Ugandans had necessitated a "tremendous" diversion of the country's resources away from development work, and he estimated that the war took $1 million a day to finance. Scholars' estimates of the total direct costs of the war for the Tanzanians range from $500 million to $1 billion. In Kagera, $108 million worth in economic assets were destroyed. Tanzania received no financial assistance from other countries in the OAU during the war. (Note: Tanzania received large amounts of Western international developmental aid, but little of it was tied to the war with Uganda. A request for $366 million in relief for the war brought only a minor response from four of Tanzania's regular donors.) As a result, the government in Dar es Salaam had to finance the invasion of Uganda and subsequent peacekeeping mission from its own funds, further driving the country into poverty. The financial burden severely disrupted food supplies and health care services. Tanzania would not fully recover from the cost of the war until Uganda paid its debt back to Tanzania in 2007.

When the TPDF began returning en masse to Tanzania, only a small number of soldiers were demobilised, contrary to public expectations. Military commanders then began making accommodations to render the wartime expansions of the army permanent, creating new units and divisional headquarters. Some in the military hierarchy expressed disapproval in light of Tanzania's bleak financial situation, and the country's depressed economy eventually forced the TPDF to disband many of the extra units. Nevertheless, the TPDF retained a large amount of officers in the standing army, with the assumption that they could be used to command militiamen in the event they needed to be called back into service. The post-war size of the TPDF remained larger than the pre-war size throughout the next decade.

Despite the PLO's involvement in the Ugandan war effort, Nyerere did not harbour any ill will towards the organisation, instead citing its isolation on the international stage as the reason for its closeness to Amin. Tanzania's relations with Libya experienced a rapprochement in 1982. The Tanzanian government strengthened its presence in Kagera after the war, bolstering its police station in Kyaka and establishing several others in border towns. For security reasons, villagers were prohibited from occupying land within 100 metres (330 ft) of the border, though there was little oversight of this restriction over time and it was sometimes ignored by locals. In the immediate aftermath of the war the government shut down cross-border markets, resulting in shortages of goods and spikes in commodity prices. Smuggling also became rampant. Normal trade with Uganda did not resume until the 1990s. As the original demarcation posts along the Uganda–Tanzania border were removed in the war, the border dispute between the two countries remained after the conflict, but at a low intensity. Negotiations between Uganda and Tanzania on reestablishing a complete, official demarcation of the border began in 1999 and concluded successfully in 2001.

In addition, Tanzania experienced a spike in crime and communal violence, most importantly cattle raiding, as a result of the Uganda–Tanzania War. The mobilisation of tens of thousands of soldiers had a major impact on Tanzania's society, as many young men from poorer families had enjoyed the power, chance of plunder, and relatively good salaries of military life. When they were demobilised, these men usually became unemployed and plunged back into poverty due to Tanzania's struggling economic situation, resulting in rising dissatisfaction. In addition, Tanzanian soldiers had smuggled large quantities of abandoned Ugandan weaponry into their home country. Having grown accustomed to violence in the military, many veterans consequently used their guns to acquire wealth illegally. This increased crime and led to communal tensions. Some groups were overrepresented in the TPDF; most notably, by 1978, over 50% of all Tanzanian soldiers belonged to the Kuria people, although they made up less than 1% of the country's population. There were also regional differences in the number of veterans, with some villages having many more armed ex-soldiers than others. All this contributed to power shifts, and growing inter-tribal, inter-clan, and even inter-village violence in Tanzania. There is a widespread belief among Tanzanians and among some health workers that the war contributed to the spread of AIDS across the country (though the first identified case of AIDS in Tanzania was in 1984).

== Legacy ==
=== Commemoration ===
The 435 Tanzanian soldiers who died during the war were buried at the Kaboya Military Cemetery in Muleba District, Kagera Region. A white monument was erected in the cemetery and adorned with the names of the dead. Nyerere, Tanzanian Vice President Aboud Jumbe, Prime Minister Sokoine, Chief of Defence Forces Abdallah Twalipo, and Chama Cha Mapinduzi Executive Secretary Pius Msekwa visited the monument on 26 July 1979 to pay their respects to the dead soldiers. Another monument was built in Arusha, displaying a statue of a soldier celebrating victory. Nyerere toured Tabora, Arusha, Mtwara, Bukoba, Mwanza, Tanga, Zanzibar, Iringa, Dodoma, Dar es Salaam, and Mara to thank the Tanzanian population for its contributions to the war effort. On 1 September 1979 a series of national ceremonies were held to honour public contribution to the war effort. On 25 July 2014 Tanzania observed the 36th anniversary of the war and recognised the soldiers and civilians that died in the conflict.

After the war and until 1986, when Museveni took power, 11 April was celebrated as "Liberation Day" in Uganda. In 2002 Uganda renewed its official celebration of Amin's overthrow. In the 2000s the Ugandan Government established the Kagera Medal to be awarded to Ugandan rebels or foreigners who fought against Amin's regime between 1971 and 1979.

=== Historiography and documentation ===
Historians have paid little attention to the war and few books have been written about it. Tanzanian journalist Baldwin Mzirai published Kuzama kwa Idi Amin in 1980, which details the Tanzanian military operations of the conflict. American journalists Tony Avirgan and Martha Honey published War in Uganda: The Legacy of Idi Amin in 1983. They followed Tanzanian forces into Uganda and witnessed the battles for Entebbe and Kampala. The 11-chapter work, in addition to covering the conflict, discusses some of its political implications in Uganda. Henry R. Muhanika published an Utenzi poetic account of the war in 1981, Utenzi wa vita vya Kagera na anguko la Idi Amin Dada. In 1980, the state-owned Tanzania Film Company and the Audio Visual Institute released a colour documentary chronicling the conflict, entitled, Vita vya Kagera. It emphasised the "bravery and determination" of the Tanzanian forces. The war is known in Tanzania as the Kagera War and in Uganda as the 1979 Liberation War.

== See also ==
- List of wars involving Tanzania
- List of wars involving Uganda

== Works cited ==
- "Accessions List, Eastern Africa". Accessions List, Eastern Africa. Annual Serial Supplement. 15. Nairobi: Library of Congress Office. 1982. ISSN 0090-371X.
- Acheson-Brown, Daniel G. (2001). "The Tanzanian Invasion of Uganda: A Just War?" (PDF). International Third World Studies Journal and Review. 12: 1–11. ISSN 1041-3944. Archived from the original (PDF) on 12 June 2011.
- Aminzade, Ronald (2013). Race, Nation, and Citizenship in Postcolonial Africa: The Case of Tanzania. New York City: Cambridge University Press. ISBN 978-1-107-43605-3.
- Amos, John W. II (1980). Palestinian Resistance: Organization of a Nationalist Movement. New York City: Pergamon Press. ISBN 978-0-08-025094-6.
- Avirgan, Tony; Honey, Martha (1983). War in Uganda: The Legacy of Idi Amin. Dar es Salaam: Tanzania Publishing House. ISBN 978-9976-1-0056-3.
- Brzoska, Michael; Pearson, Frederic S. (1994). Arms and Warfare: Escalation, De-escalation, and Negotiation. Columbia, South Carolina: University of South Carolina Press. ISBN 978-0-87249-982-9.
- Chesterman, Simon (2002). Just War Or Just Peace?: Humanitarian Intervention and International Law (revised ed.). Oxford University Press. ISBN 978-0-19-925799-7.
- Cooper, Tom; Fontanellaz, Adrien (2015). Wars and Insurgencies of Uganda 1971–1994. Solihull: Helion & Company Limited. ISBN 978-1-910294-55-0.
- Decker, Alicia C. (2014). In Idi Amin's Shadow: Women, Gender, and Militarism in Uganda. Athens, Ohio: Ohio University Press. ISBN 978-0-8214-4502-0.
- Eminue, Okon (2010). "Conflict development in the African region". In Bassey, Celestine Oyom; Oshita, Oshita O. (eds.). Governance and Border Security in Africa. Lagos: African Books Collective. ISBN 978-978-8422-07-5.
- Fair, Laura (2018). Reel Pleasures: Cinema Audiences and Entrepreneurs in Twentieth-Century Urban Tanzania. Athens, Ohio: Ohio University Press. ISBN 978-0-8214-4611-9.
- Fleisher, Michael L. (2003) [1st pub. 2000]. Kuria Cattle Raiders: Violence and Vigilantism on the Tanzania/Kenya Frontier (4th ed.). Ann Arbor, Michigan: University of Michigan Press. ISBN 978-0-472-08698-6.
- Fleisher, Michael L. (February 2002). "'War is Good for Thieving!' The Symbiosis of Crime and Warfare Among the Kuria of Tanzania". Africa. 72 (1): 131–149. doi:10.3366/afr.2002.72.1.131. S2CID 145478448.
- Francis, Joyce L. (1994). War as a social trap: The case of Tanzania (PhD thesis). American University. OCLC 33488070.
- Harneit-Sievers, Axel, ed. (2002). A Place in the World: New Local Historiographies from Africa and South Asia. Leiden: BRILL. ISBN 978-90-04-12303-8.
- Hilgers, Andrea (1991). "Der Krieg in Uganda". In Siegelberg, Jens (ed.). Die Kriege 1985 bis 1990: Analyse ihrer Ursachen [The wars 1985 to 1990: Analysis of their causes] (in German). Münster; Hamburg: LIT. pp. 156–165. ISBN 3-88660-757-7.
- Hockenberry, John (2003). War: With John Hockenberry. The Infinite Mind. Cambridge, Massachusetts: Lichtenstein Creative Media. ISBN 978-1-933644-12-7.
- Hooper, Edward (1999). The River: A Journey Back to the Source of HIV and AIDS. London: Allen Lane. ISBN 978-0-7139-9335-6.
- Kamazima, Switbert Rwechungura (2004). Borders, Boundaries, Peoples, and States: a Comparative Analysis of Post-independence Tanzania-Uganda Border Regions (PhD thesis). University of Minnesota. OCLC 62698476.
- Kamazima, Switbert R. (August 2018). "Fifty years of the Tanzania-Uganda 1°00´S terrestrial border peace mediation: an insider-outsider's perspective" (PDF). International Journal of Advanced Scientific Research and Management. 3 (8). ISSN 2455-6378.
- Kasozi, A.B.K. (1994). Nakanyike Musisi; James Mukooza Sejjengo (eds.). Social Origins of Violence in Uganda, 1964–1985. Montreal; Quebec: McGill-Queen's University Press. ISBN 978-0-7735-1218-4.
- Konde, Hadji (1984). Press Freedom in Tanzania. Eastern Africa Publications. ISBN 978-9976-2-0029-4.
- Lagarde, Dominique (8 March 1979). "Ugandan-Tanzanian war examined. Amin Dada: His War in Tanzania". Translations on Sub-Saharan Africa, No. 2073. United States Joint Publications Research Service. pp. 1–9.
- Lamb, David (2011). The Africans (reprint ed.). London: Knopf Doubleday Publishing Group. ISBN 978-0-307-79792-6.
- Legum, Colin, ed. (1980). Africa Contemporary Record: Annual Survey and Documents: 1978–1979. Vol. XI. New York City: Africana Publishing Company. ISBN 978-0-8419-0160-5.
- Leopold, Mark (2005). Inside West Nile. Violence, History & Representation on an African Frontier. Oxford: James Currey. ISBN 978-0-85255-941-3.
- Lowman, Thomas James (2020). Beyond Idi Amin: Causes and Drivers of Political Violence in Uganda, 1971-1979 (PDF) (PhD thesis). Durham University.
- Lupogo, Herman (2001). "Tanzania: Civil-military Relations and Political Stability". African Security Review. 10 (1): 75–86. doi:10.1080/10246029.2001.9628102. S2CID 218648473. Archived from the original on 17 April 2013.
- Macrae, Joanna; Zwi, Anthony, eds. (1994). War and Hunger: Rethinking International Responses to Complex Emergencies. London: Zed Books. ISBN 978-1-85649-291-1.
- Mambo, Andrew; Schofield, Julian (2007). "Military Diversion in the 1978 Uganda–Tanzania War". Journal of Political and Military Sociology. 35 (2): 299–321. ISSN 0047-2697.
- Mazarire, Gerald Chikozho (2017). "ZANU's External Networks 1963–1979: An Appraisal". African Diplomacy and International Connections. 43 (1): 83–106. doi:10.1080/03057070.2017.1281040. S2CID 151530240.
- Matatu, Gordon (May 1979). "The End of Uganda's Nightmare". Africa. No. 93. pp. 10–16.
- May, Roy; Furley, Oliver (2017). African Interventionist States. Milton, Vale of White Horse: Routledge. ISBN 978-1-351-75635-8.
- Mmbando, S. I. (1980). The Tanzania-Uganda War in Pictures. Dar es Salaam: Longman Tanzania. ISBN 978-0-582-78534-2.
- Moshiro, G. (1990). "The Role of Radio Tanzania Dar es Salaam in Mobilising the Masses: A Critique" (PDF). Africa Media Review. 4 (3): 18–35. ISSN 0258-4913.
- Murphy, Sean D. (1996). Humanitarian Intervention: The United Nations in an Evolving World Order. Philadelphia: University of Pennsylvania Press. ISBN 978-0-8122-3382-7.
- Mwikwabe, Mbota Amani (December 2018). "An Assessment of Media Influence and its Effects on Tanzania Peoples Defence Forces Operations during the Kagera War from 1978 to June 1979" (PDF). International Journal of Law, Humanities & Social Science. 3 (1): 55–67. ISSN 2521-0793.
- Mzirai, Baldwin (1980). Kuzama kwa Idi Amin (in Swahili). Dar es Salaam: Publicity International. OCLC 9084117.
- Nyeko, Balam (January 1997). "Exile Politics and Resistance to Dictatorship: The Ugandan Anti-Amin Organizations in Zambia, 1972–79". African Affairs. 96 (382): 95–108. doi:10.1093/oxfordjournals.afraf.a007823.
- Oloya, Opiyo (2013). Child to Soldier: Stories from Joseph Kony's Lord's Resistance Army. Toronto: University of Toronto Press. ISBN 978-1-4426-1417-8.
- Omara-Otunnu, Amii (1987). Politics and the Military in Uganda, 1890–1985. London: Palgrave Macmillan. ISBN 978-1-349-18738-6.
- Otunnu, Ogenga (2016). Crisis of Legitimacy and Political Violence in Uganda, 1890 to 1979. Chicago: Palgrave Macmillan. ISBN 978-3-319-33155-3.
- Otunnu, Ogenga (2017). Crisis of Legitimacy and Political Violence in Uganda, 1979 to 2016. Chicago: Palgrave Macmillan. ISBN 978-3-319-33155-3.
- Paxton, J., ed. (2016). The Statesman's Year-Book 1978-79 (reprint ed.). London: Springer. ISBN 978-0-230-27107-4.
- Pollack, Kenneth Michael (2004). Arabs at War: Military Effectiveness, 1948–1991. Lincoln: University of Nebraska Press. ISBN 978-0-8032-0686-1.
- Posnett, Richard (April 1980). "Uganda after Amin". The World Today. 36 (4): 147–153. JSTOR 40395418.
- Rice, Andrew (20 August 2003). "The General" (PDF). Institute of Current World Affairs Letters. AR (12).
- Roberts, George (2017). "The Uganda–Tanzania War, the fall of Idi Amin, and the failure of African diplomacy, 1978–1979". In Anderson, David M.; Rolandsen, Øystein H. (eds.). Politics and Violence in Eastern Africa: The Struggles of Emerging States. London: Routledge. pp. 154–171. ISBN 978-1-317-53952-0.
- Ronen, Yehudit (July 1992). "Libya's Intervention in Amin's Uganda– A Broken Spearhead". Asian and African Studies. 26 (2): 173–183. ISSN 0066-8281.
- Rwehururu, Bernard (2002). Cross to the Gun. Kampala: Monitor. OCLC 50243051.
- Southall, Aiden (December 1980). "Social Disorganisation in Uganda: Before, during, and after Amin". The Journal of Modern African Studies. 18 (4): 627–656. doi:10.1017/s0022278x00014774. JSTOR 160801. S2CID 154245518.
- Seftel, Adam, ed. (2010) [1st pub. 1994]. Uganda: The Bloodstained Pearl of Africa and Its Struggle for Peace. From the Pages of Drum. Kampala: Fountain Publishers. ISBN 978-9970-02-036-2.
- Singh, Madanjeet (2012). Culture of the Sepulchre: Idi Amin's Monster Regime. New Delhi: Penguin Books India. ISBN 978-0-670-08573-6.
- Thom, William G. (1988). "Judging Africa's Military Capabilities". Journal of Third World Studies. 5 (1): 52–65. JSTOR 45192991.
- Thornton, Robert (2008). Unimagined Community: Sex, Networks, and AIDS in Uganda and South Africa. Berkeley: University of California Press. ISBN 978-0-520-25552-4.
- Twesigye, Emmanuel K. (2001). Religion & Ethics for a New Age: Evolutionist Approach. Lanham, Maryland: University Press of America. ISBN 978-0-7618-2024-6.
- Venter, Al J. (October 1979). "The War is over – What next?". Soldier of Fortune. 4 (10). Soldier of Fortune: 58–59, 77, 84–85.
- Wheeler, Nicholas J. (2000). Saving Strangers: Humanitarian Intervention in International Society (reprint ed.). Oxford: Oxford University Press. ISBN 978-0-19-829621-8.
