= List of ambassadors of Uganda to China =

Coordinates: 39.942048°N 116.458263°E

The Ugandan Ambassador in Kenya is the official representative of the Government in Kampala to the Government of China.

== List of representatives ==
Diplomatic agreement/designated/Diplomatic accreditation	Ambassador	Observations	List of heads of state of Uganda	Premier of the People's Republic of China	Term end
October 8, 1962		The governments in Kampala and Beijing established diplomatic relations.	Edward Mutesa	Zhou Enlai	
May 23, 1973	William Matovu		Idi Amin	Zhou Enlai	
November 5, 1979	James Oporia-Ekwaro		Godfrey Binaisa	Hua Guofeng	
September 1, 1981	George Paliel Ufoyuru	G.P. Ufoyuru	Tito Okello	Zhao Ziyang	
November 5, 1986	William Wycliffe Rwetsiba		Yoweri Museveni	Li Peng	
January 20, 1992	Fredrick Alex Oketcho	(*1950): From 27 to 29 of July 1985 he was member in the junta of Bazilio Olara Okello.; In 1989 he was chief of staff promoted to major general and secretary of defence, to take the place of Major-General Emilio Mondo, who was retired. The new chief of staff became Colonel Nanyumba.; On 30 October 1998 Yoweri Museveni appointed him director general of the External Security Organisation.; On September 28, 2015 he was retired.	Yoweri Museveni	Li Peng	
July 12, 1999	Philip Idro		Yoweri Museveni	Zhu Rongji	June 10, 2006
June 10, 2006	Charles Madibo Wagidoso		Yoweri Museveni	Wen Jiabao	
January 27, 2017	Chrispus Kyonga		Yoweri Museveni	Li Keqiang	

- China–Uganda relations
