= List of ambassadors of China to Uganda =

Coordinates: 0.336792°N 32.594225°E

Chinese Ambassador to Uganda
- Inaugural holder: He Ying
- Formation: April 1963; 63 years ago

The Chinese ambassador to Uganda is the official representative of the People's Republic of China to the Republic of Uganda.

== List of representatives ==
Diplomatic agrément/Diplomatic accreditation	Ambassador	Chinese language zh:中国驻乌干达大使列表	Observations	Premier of the People's Republic of China	President of Uganda	Term end
October 18, 1962			The governments in Beijing and Kampala established diplomatic relations.	Zhou Enlai	Edward Mutesa	
April 1963	He Ying (PRC diplomat)	zh:何英 (外交官)	(*Nov. 1914-3 Oktober 1993): From September 1954 to August 1958 he was Chinese Ambassador to Mongolia.; From April 1963 to April 1964 he was Ambassador in Kampala.; From July 1964 to May 1969 he was Chinese Ambassador to Tanzania.	Zhou Enlai	Edward Mutesa	April 1964
May 1964	Chen Zhifang	zh:陈志方		Zhou Enlai	Edward Mutesa	November 1970
April 1972	Ge Buhai	zh:葛步海	From April 1972 to November 1977 he was Ambassador in Kampala.; From March 1978 to June 1981 he was Chinese Ambassador to Zambia.	Zhou Enlai	Idi Amin	November 1977
March 1978	Dai Lu	zh:戴路	From August 1972 - October 1977 he was Chinese Ambassador to Cyprus., From March 1978 - February 1979 he was Ambassador in Kampala.	Hua Guofeng	Idi Amin	February 1979
January 1980	Zhang Bochuan	zh:张勃川		Zhao Ziyang	Presidential Commission of Uganda	March 1982
July 1982	Li Shi	zh:李石 (外交官)		Zhao Ziyang	Milton Obote	February 1985
April 1985	Jin Boxiong	zh:金伯雄		Zhao Ziyang	Tito Okello	April 1988
May 1988	Xie Youkun	zh:谢佑昆		Li Peng	Yoweri Museveni	February 1992
March 1992	Xu Yingjie	zh:徐英杰		Li Peng	Yoweri Museveni	July 1995
August 1995	Tan Xingju	zh:谭兴举		Li Peng	Yoweri Museveni	October 1997
July 1997	Song Zengshou	zh:宋增寿		Li Peng	Yoweri Museveni	June 1999
July 1999	Zhang Xujiang	zh:张序江		Zhu Rongji	Yoweri Museveni	February 2002
March 2002	Li Qiangmin	zh:李强民		Zhu Rongji	Yoweri Museveni	December 2004
December 2004	Fan Guijin	zh:樊桂金		Wen Jiabao	Yoweri Museveni	November 2007
December 2007	Sun Heping	zh:孙和平		Wen Jiabao	Yoweri Museveni	October 2011
October 2011	Zhao Yali	zh:趙亞力		Wen Jiabao	Yoweri Museveni	September 2016
November 2016	Zheng ZhuQiang	郑竹强		Li Keqiang	Yoweri Museveni	March 2023

== See also ==
- China–Uganda relations
