= List of wars involving Tanzania =

The following is a list of wars involving Tanzania since its formation in 1964.

Conflict	Combatant 1	Combatant 2	Results	President	Tanzanian losses
Mozambican Civil War (1977–78; 1987–88)	(Mozambique) FRELIMO; Tanzania; Zimbabwe	RENAMO; Rhodesia	Stalemate: Rome General Peace Accords	Julius Nyerere	99 killed
Uganda–Tanzania War (1978–79)	Tanzania (Uganda) UNLA; Mozambique	Uganda (History of Libya under Muammar Gaddafi) Libya (Palestine) PLO	Victory: Overthrow of Idi Amin in Uganda	Julius Nyerere	373 killed
Ugandan Bush War (1980–1986)	Uganda (Obote government); Tanzania	Ugandan rebels: NRA, Uganda Army, UNRF (I), FUNA, UFM, others	Defeat: Tanzanian withdrawal in 1981; advisors initially remain in Uganda; Pro-Tanzanian government in Uganda overthrown in 1985; Tanzania begins to support its former enemy, the NRA, with weaponry	Julius Nyerere	?
Invasion of Anjouan (2008)	Tanzania; Sudan; Comoros; Senegal	Anjouan	Victory: Toppling of Mohamed Bacar	Jakaya Kikwete	None
M23 Rebellion (2013)	Democratic Republic of the Congo (United Nations) MONUSCO: (United Nations) Force Intervention Brigade; South Africa; Tanzania; Malawi	March 23 Movement; Alleged support: Uganda; Rwanda	Victory: M23 disarms and demobilises	Jakaya Kikwete	1 killed
ADF Insurgency (2015–)	DR Congo; Uganda; South Africa; Tanzania; Malawi	ADF	Ongoing: UNFIB intervention in 2015	Jakaya Kikwete	15+ killed
