= Sun Heping (scientist) =

Chinese scientist (born 1955)

- 孙和平
- Born: August 1955 (age 71); Jiangyin, Jiangsu, China
- Education: University of Science and Technology of China; Catholic University of Leuven
- Scientific career
- Fields: Geophysics; Geodesy
- Workplaces: Institute of Geodesy and Geophysics，Chinese Academy of Sciences

Chinese name
- Traditional Chinese: 孫和平
- Simplified Chinese: 孙和平
Transcriptions
Standard Mandarin
- Hanyu Pinyin: Sūn Hépíng

Sun Heping (Chinese: 孙和平; born August 1955) is a Chinese scientist currently serving as director of the Institute of Geodesy and Geophysics, Chinese Academy of Sciences (CAS).

== Education ==
Sun was born in Jiangyin, Jiangsu in August 1955. In December 1976 he entered the University of Science and Technology of China, where he graduated in July 1980. In November 1991 he was accepted to Catholic University of Leuven, earning his doctor's degree in January 1996.

== Career ==
In August 1980 he joined the Seismological Research Institute of China Seismological Bureau, he remained there until October 1991. In January 1997 he became a researcher at the Institute of Geodesy and Geophysics, Chinese Academy of Sciences (CAS), where he was promoted to become deputy director in December 2000 and director in February 2005.

He is a member of the Chinese Society for Geodesy, Photogrammetry and Cartography (CSGPC) and the Chinese Geophysical Society (CGS).

== Honours and awards ==
- November 22, 2019 Member of the Chinese Academy of Sciences (CAS)
