= Sun Heping (diplomat) =

Chinese diplomat

- 孙和平

Chinese Ambassador to Uganda
- In office December 2007 – October 2011
- Preceded by: Fan Guijin
- Succeeded by: Zhao Yali

Chinese Ambassador to Nepal
- In office September 2003 – March 2007
- Preceded by: Wu Congyong
- Succeeded by: Zheng Xianglin

Personal details
- Party: Chinese Communist Party
- Occupation: Diplomat

Chinese name
- Traditional Chinese: 孫和平
- Simplified Chinese: 孙和平
Transcriptions
Standard Mandarin
- Hanyu Pinyin: Sūn Hépíng

Sun Heping (Chinese: 孙和平) is a Chinese diplomat served two times as Ambassador: to Nepal (2003–2007) and Uganda (2007–2011).

== Biography ==
In September 2003 he succeeded Wu Congyong as Chinese Ambassador to Nepal, serving in that position from 2003 to 2007. He served as the Chinese Ambassador to Uganda from December 2007 until October 2011, when he was succeeded by Zhao Yali.

Diplomatic posts
| Previous: Wu Congyong | Chinese Ambassador to Nepal; 2003–2007 | Next: Zheng Xianglin |
| Previous: Fan Guijin | Chinese Ambassador to Uganda; 2007–2011 | Next: Zhao Yali |
