= Karuma Falls =

- Map of Uganda showing the location of Karuma Falls.
- Coordinates: 02°14′03″N 32°14′47″E
- Country: Uganda
- Region: Western Region
- Sub-region: Bunyoro sub-region
- District: Kiryandongo District
- Elevation: 1,000 m (3,300 ft)
- Time zone: UTC+3 (EAT)

Karuma Falls is a town in Western Region of Uganda.

== Location ==
Karuma Falls is on the Kampala–Gulu Highway, immediately south of where the highway crosses the River Nile. Karuma Falls is approximately 97 kilometres (60 mi), by road, northeast of Masindi and approximately 77 kilometres (48 mi), by road, south of Gulu, the largest city in Northern Uganda.

Karuma Falls is the location of Karuma Power Station, the largest hydropower project in Uganda with a planned capacity of 600 megawatts. The coordinates of Karuma Falls are 2° 14' 3.00"N, 32° 14' 47.00"E (latitude: 2.234167; longitude: 32.246390). The average elevation is about 1,000 metres (3,300 ft) above sea level.

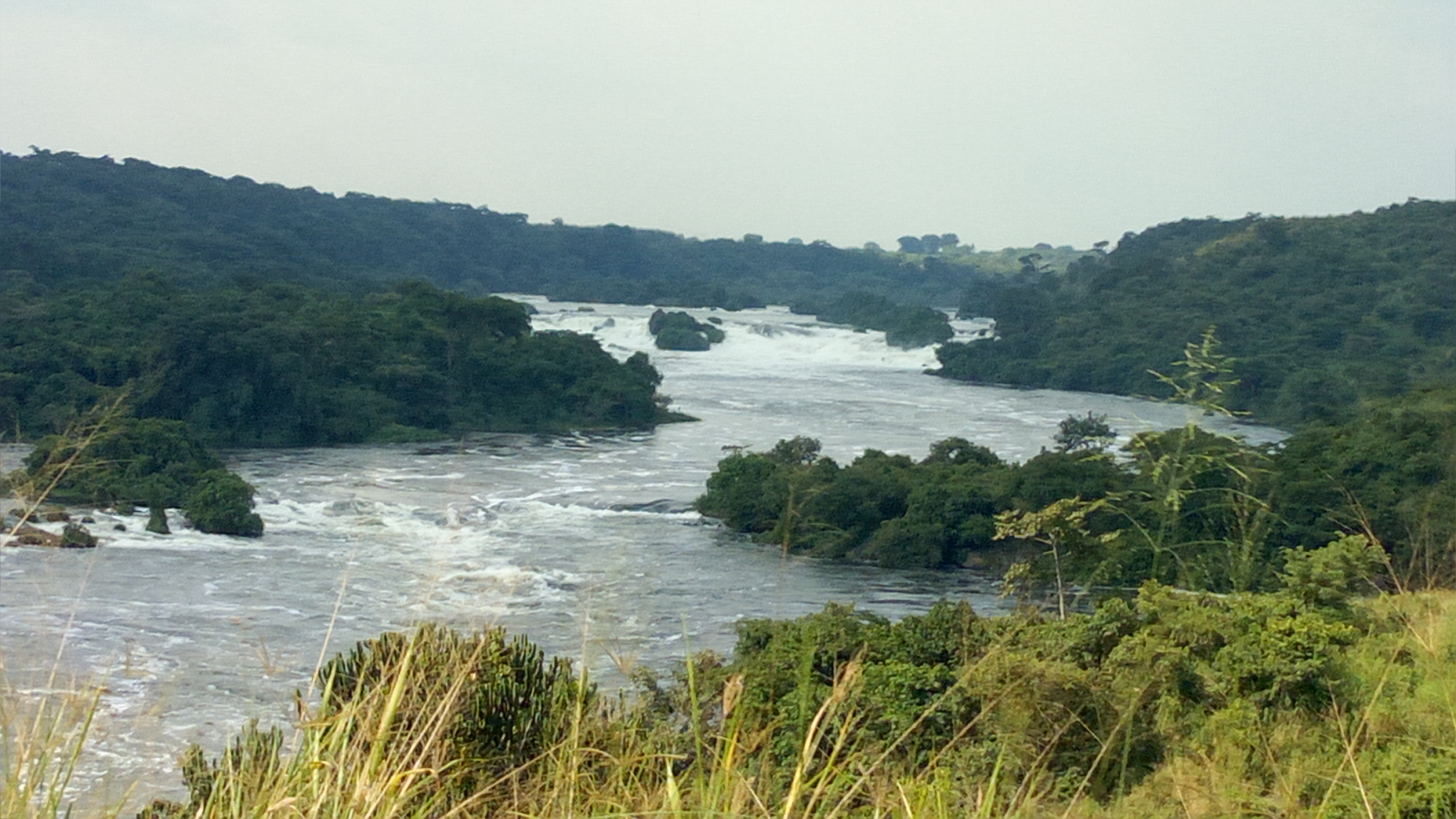
View of River Nile at Karuma

== Planning ==
In March 2013, Ugandan print media reported that the national government was planning a large modern city to be constructed at the site of the current town, to include the site of the proposed Karuma Power Station currently under construction.

== Points of interest ==
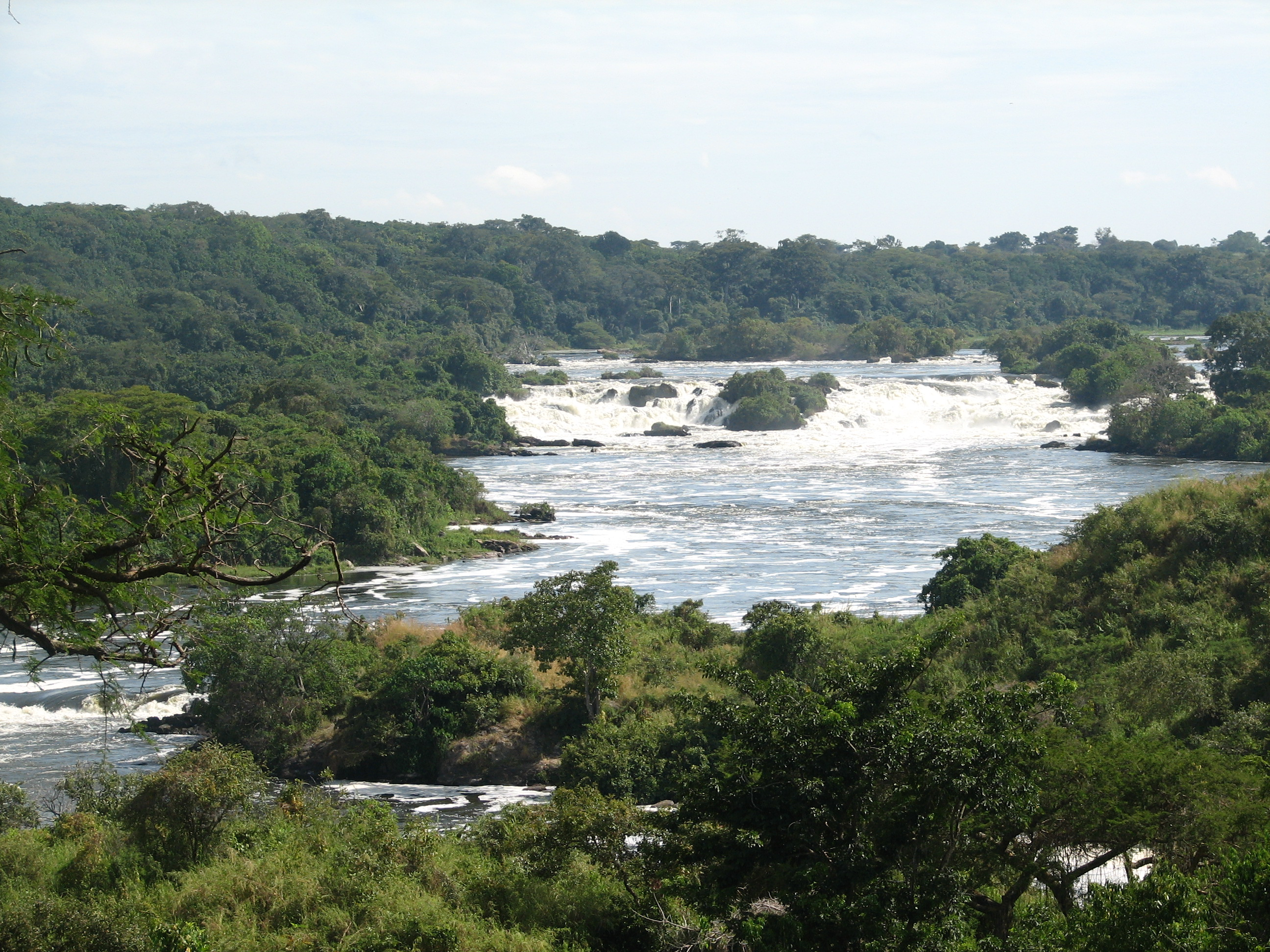
The Falls on the Nile River.

The following additional points of interest are found at or near Karuma Falls:

- Kampala–Gulu Highway, crossing the river at this location.

== Photos and diagrams ==
- Photo of Karuma Falls at Gorillatales.com

== See also ==
- Kiryandongo
