= Yorokamu Tizihwayo =

Ugandan military officer

- Born: Ankole, southern Uganda
- Died: 1979; Kasese, Uganda
- Spouse: Zeuria Tizihwayo
- Children: Dan Mujinya Tizihwayo
- Military career
- Allegiance: Uganda
- Branch: Uganda Army
- Service years: ? – 1979
- Rank: Brigadier
- Commands: 2nd Paratrooper Battalion; Western Brigade
- Conflicts: Uganda–Tanzania War; Battle of Gayaza Hills; Battle of Rugaando

Yorokamu Tizihwayo, also known as Y. Tiziriwayho and Yerukamu, was a Ugandan military officer. He served as a high-ranking commander during Idi Amin's rule as Ugandan President, first as the head of the 2nd Paratrooper Battalion and later for the Western Brigade. In the Uganda–Tanzania War (1978–1979), Tizihwayo led the Uganda Army troops which opposed the Tanzania People's Defence Force's advance into western Uganda. Despite being regarded as a talented soldier and considered one of the Tanzanians' more dangerous opponents during the war, he was eventually arrested and executed on alleged treason charges by Amin's State Research Bureau.

== Biography ==
=== Early career ===
According to George Ivan Smith, Tizihwayo was Christian and born in Ankole, southern Uganda. He already served in the Uganda Army during the presidency of Milton Obote. By 1966, he was a sergeant in the army's Training Company. By the time of the 1971 Ugandan coup d'état and Idi Amin's takeover as President, Tizihwayo held the rank of lieutenant. After the coup, he was promoted to major in the 2nd Paratrooper Battalion. In January 1974, he was made lieutenant colonel and head of the unit.

Leadership of the 2nd Paratrooper Battalion was later transferred to Lt. Col. Francis Itabuka, and Tizihwayo was appointed commander of the Western Brigade, also known as the "Western command".

=== Uganda–Tanzania War and death ===
In late 1978, the Uganda–Tanzania War broke out under unclear circumstances. An initial Ugandan invasion of Tanzanian territory was defeated, whereupon the Tanzanians prepared a counter-offensive into Uganda. In December 1978, Tizihwayo and Itabuka accompanied Amin to a rally at Ruhaama County (modern Ntungamo District).

On 21 or 23 February 1979, the 206th Brigade of the Tanzania People's Defence Force (TPDF) attacked the Gayaza Hills inside Uganda. After heavy combat, the 2nd Paratrooper Battalion retreated, entrenched themselves, and set-up an ambush under the leadership of Tizihwayo. The following clash resulted in a Tanzanian victory, but the TPDF suffered more casualties than in any other single engagement over the course of the conflict. According to journalists Tony Avirgan and Martha Honey, the ambush at the Gayaza Hills was one of the few military operations skillfully carried out by the Uganda Army during the entire war. The 206th Brigade's commander Silas Mayunga reportedly cursed Tizihwayo's name for his role in the battle. Yoweri Museveni –leader of the anti-Amin FRONASA rebels– argued that "Tizihwayo and Rwehururu [...] gave us a lot of trouble", expressing the view that they wasted their military talents by defending Amin’s regime.

On 25 March 1979, Uganda Army troops under Tizihwayo counter-attacked at Rugaando in the Mbarara area. Though they inflicted a few losses on the Tanzanians, the TPDF battle order was well-prepared and repelled the assault. At some point, a Tanzanian propaganda programme claimed that Tizihwayo was in contact with FRONASA rebels and planning on defecting. The State Research Bureau, Uganda's intelligence agency, considered the reports believable and arrested Tizihwayo, eventually executing him in Kasese. Whether Tizihwayo had actually planned to defect remains disputed. Museveni commented that he only learned of these claims through newspaper reports. In contrast, Tizihwayo's son voiced his belief in the claim, maintaining that his father had "died during the struggle to liberate his motherland".

Following Tizihwayo's death, the TPDF encountered only limited resistance in western Uganda, easily capturing Kasese, Fort Portal, Masindi, and other cities. However, several Uganda Army soldiers who had served under his command refused to surrender after the collapse of Amin's government. These veterans retreated into Zaire and eventually joined the Allied Democratic Forces. Yorokamu Tizihwayo's son, Dan Mujinya Tizihwayo, eventually became a colonel in the Uganda People's Defence Force.
