= Mrisho Sarakikya =

Mrisho S.H. Sarakikya
- Born: 1934 (age 91–92); Meru District, Arusha, Tanganyika
- Military career
- Allegiance: Britain; Tanganyika; Tanzania
- Branch: King's African Rifles; Tanganyika Rifles; Tanzania People's Defence Force
- Service years: 1958–1974
- Rank: Major General
- Nickname: General Mutukula
- Conflicts: Uganda–Tanzania War

Mrisho S.H. Sarakikya (born 1934) was the first chief of the Tanzania People's Defence Force (TPDF). He was given command of the TPDF soon after the army mutiny of 1964, when either a captain (Reuters 1967) or a lieutenant (Kaplan 1978).

== Early life ==
He was born at Meru, Tanganyika in 1934. He attended Nkoaranga Lutheran Primary School and then moving on to Old Moshi secondary school. Due to his performance, he was then invited to the prestigious Tabora Government Secondary School. Once graduating, he entered the Tanganyikan portion of the King's African Rifles as a private in 1958; and later attended the Royal Military Academy Sandhurst.

== Military career ==
During the mutiny within the newly formed Tanganyika Rifles in 1964, Sarakikya was in Tabora and remained loyal to Nyerere. Following the aftermath, other senior officers were dismissed or sacked and he was given command of the newly formed Tanzania People's Defence Force. From 1964 to 1974, he commanded the TPDF. He was succeeded by Lieutenant General Abdallah Twalipo.

Military offices
Preceded by Brigadier Patrick Douglas (as Commander, Tanganyika Rifles)	Chief of Tanzanian People's Defence Force; 1964-1974	Succeeded by Abdallah Twalipo
