= Western Uganda campaign =

Eastern Uganda campaign may refer to:

- Western Uganda campaign of 1979
- NRA offensives of 1985 and 1986
