= Western Uganda campaign of 1979 =

Western Uganda campaign
- Part of the Uganda–Tanzania War
Date	c. late February – May 1979
Location	Western Uganda
Result	Tanzanian-led victory
Territorial changes	Southwestern and western Uganda mostly occupied by Tanzanian forces; Rwenzururu movement extends its territorial control in the Rwenzori Mountains

Belligerents
Tanzania; Ugandan rebels (reorganized as UNLF from March 1979) Rwenzururu movement	Uganda; Libya (alleged); Palestine Liberation Organisation (alleged)

Commanders and leaders
(Tanzania) Silas Mayunga (Tanzania) Roland Makunda (Tanzania) Ahmed Kitete (Tanzania) Muhiddin Kimario (from April); Yoweri Museveni	Yorokamu Tizihwayo (executed); Bernard Rwehururu; Abdu Kisuule (defected)

Units involved
(Tanzania) TPDF "Task Force": 206th Brigade; Minziro Brigade; (Tanzania) 205th Brigade (from April); FRONASA; Kikosi Maalum	Uganda Army: Western Brigade; Simba Battalion; Suicide Battalion; 2nd Paratrooper Battalion; Tiger Regiment; Artillery & Signals Regiment

Strength
(Tanzania) Three brigades FRONASA: 2,000+	Unknown

The Western Uganda campaign of 1979 was a military operation by Tanzanian forces and allied Ugandan rebels, mainly the Front for National Salvation (FRONASA), against Uganda Army (UA) troops loyal to Ugandan President Idi Amin during the Uganda–Tanzania War. The operation was launched by the Tanzania People's Defence Force's (TPDF) "Task Force", consisting of two brigades, in February 1979 to cover the Tanzanians' western axis of advance into Uganda. After securing the important city of Mbarara against Uganda Army counter-attacks, the TPDF Task Force captured several cities as well as the Kilembe Mines in the Rwenzori Mountains. These operations coincided with an expansion of the separatist Rwenzururu movement, a rebel group that exploited the collapse of the Uganda Army along the Uganda-Zaire border to secure territory and weaponry for itself. From the Rwenzori Mountains, the Task Force advanced to Hoima; there, it combined forces with another Tanzanian force, the 205th Brigade. Together, the TPDF formations advanced to Masindi, capturing it after a battle south of the city. With western Uganda largely under Tanzanian control, the Task Force and 205th Brigade subsequently split up again to capture northwestern and north-central Uganda.

== Background ==
Map of the battles of the Uganda–Tanzania War

In 1971, Idi Amin became President of Uganda when his predecessor, Milton Obote, was overthrown in a military coup. This event precipitated a deterioration of relations with the neighbouring state of Tanzania. Amin ruled the country under a repressive dictatorship. Tanzanian President Julius Nyerere allowed anti-Amin insurgents to operate from Tanzania. These Ugandan rebels included Obote and his followers as well as several smaller factions, including Yoweri Museveni's Front for National Salvation (FRONASA).

In October 1978, the Uganda Army (UA) launched an invasion of Tanzania under disputed circumstances, resulting in open war. Tanzania halted the assault, mobilised anti-Amin opposition groups, and launched a counter-offensive. The Tanzanians initially only secured a number of strategic locations across the border. When Amin failed to renounce his claims to Kagera and the Organisation of African Unity failed to condemn the Ugandan invasion, Nyerere decided that Tanzanian forces should occupy southern Uganda, specifically the two major towns there: Masaka and Mbarara. Based on assurances by Obote, the Tanzanians hoped that capturing these towns would cause the Uganda Army to disintegrate and result in a mass uprising against Amin's regime, allowing the Tanzanians to exit the war.

The Tanzania People's Defence Force (TPDF) and allied rebels captured Masaka on 24 February, followed by Mbarara on the next day. At the latter town, the TPDF only encountered token resistance by the Simba Battalion which fled after a minor clash with FRONASA insurgents. The TPDF and anti-Amin rebels destroyed both settlements in revenge for the destruction caused by Ugandan soldiers in Kagera. No mass uprising against Amin materialised. However, locals urged the Tanzanians not to withdraw again, claiming that they would be massacred once Amin's forces retook the area. The Ugandan President substantiated these fears as he made public statements, threatening southern Ugandans for collaborating with the TPDF.

Following the capture of Masaka and Mbarara, the TPDF halted. Nyerere feared international repercussions and condemnation if the TPDF advanced even further, yet ultimately decided to sanction a continuation of the offensive so that "several million people in southern Uganda [would not be left] at the mercy of Amin". However, he wanted the next phase of operations to involve the anti-Amin rebels in a greater capacity; Ugandan opposition representatives were consequently sent to occupied towns as administrators and to urge locals to enlist in the rebel militias. In Mbarara, Yoweri Museveni was able to enlist 2,000 for his FRONASA contingent. In addition, the TPDF reorganized, adapting to the fact that the following operations would take place on two geographically relatively isolated axes. The western thrust was entrusted to a newly formed "Task Force", an army consisting of the 206th Brigade and the Minziro Brigade, supported by allied Ugandan insurgents. This force would operate semi-autonomously from David Musuguri's eastern army.

== Opposing forces ==
The TPDF's Task Force was placed under the overall command of Major General Silas Mayunga, while the 206th Brigade was led by Brigadier Roland Makunda and the Minziro Brigade by Brigadier Ahmed Kitete. The 206th Brigade consisted of the 2nd Battalion under Lieutenant Colonel Maganga, 14th Battalion under Mfinanga, 20th Battalion under Lt. Col. N. D. Nshimani (also spelled Shimanya), 25th Battalion under Lt. Col. Kamanda, 79th Battalion under Mtumwa, 80th Battalion under Major Mosha, Task Force Battalion under Major Kessy, and Special Force Battalion of Lt. Col. Hadji. The Ugandan rebels assigned to the Task Force consisted of FRONASA militants under Museveni, though he spent more time dealing with political and administrative issues than military ones and was largely absent from the frontlines in April and May. FRONASA had entered Tanzania with about 146 fighters and recruited more during the march from the border to Mbarara. In the reorganization period at Mbarara, FRONASA split its troops into colums of 538 which were mainly supposed to operate as guerrillas and auxiliaries for the TPDF. Journalists Tony Avirgan and Martha Honey argued that the FRONASA forces generally "proved to be next to worthless" for combat and guerrilla missions, a charge denied by Museveni who claimed that his followers were eager and comparatively effective in their auxiliary role. In addition to the FRONASA troops accompanying the Task Force, Kikosi Maalum militants loyal to Obote also operated on the western axis.

The Uganda Army troops defending western Uganda included the Simba Battalion, Western Brigade, Tiger Regiment, 2nd Paratrooper Battalion (also known as "Mountains of the Moon Battalion"), Artillery & Signals Regiment, and later also the Suicide Battalion. Avirgan and Honey singled out that the Simba Battalion, "though beaten [in previous battles], seemed never to give up". Museveni later stated that the two UA commanders who gave the Task Force a "lot of trouble" were Bernard Rwehururu and Yorokamu Tizihwayo. Rwehururu commanded the Suicide Battalion, and Tizihwayo headed the Western Brigade. According to Museveni, TPDF Task Force soldiers believed that the Uganda Army troops opposing them were supported by Libyans and Palestinians. Though Libyan soldiers and Palestine Liberation Organisation (PLO) militants were actively involved in the war on the side of the Ugandan government, it is unclear whether they were ever present in the western theatre. Museveni considered the claims about their presence in the region doubtful.

Besides the Tanzanians, their rebel allies, and the Uganda Army, there was another force which operated in western Uganda by 1979. In the Rwenzori Mountains, a separatist rebel group called the Rwenzururu movement was waging a long-time insurgency. Though poorly armed, the Rwenzururu movement maintained control of many rural areas in the mountains during Amin's rule, had set up a sort of parallel state, and raised its own taxes. It mainly consisted of Konjo and Amba militants led by Charles Mumbere, who hoped to establish an independent or at least autonomous kingdom in the Rwenzori Mountains.

== Campaign ==
=== Clashes in the Mbarara area ===
Map of Uganda showing locations of the TPDF Task Force's advance during the western campaign

Following its retreat from Mbarara, the Simba Battalion entrenched itself north of the town. It was reinforced by the 2nd Paratrooper Battalion, and began to shell the Tanzanian positions. In March, the Uganda Army launched three counter-attacks in the Mbarara area. The first targeted the 79th and 25th Battalions which had taken up positions at Ruharo; the Tanzanian battalions repelled the assault and killed several Ugandan soldiers before FRONASA troops arrived to assist in sweeping Ruharo's surroundings for stragglers. A few days later, Museveni ordered one of the FRONASA colums under Pipino to destroy the Akayanja bridge to sow unrest among a group of UA soldiers who camped at Rubiindi. Whether this mission was a success is disputed; Museveni claimed that Pipino's group dispatched a few guerrillas who successfully blew up the bridge, whereupon the Amin loyalists –fearing an attack from the rear– dispersed and fled. In contrast, Avirgan and Honey claimed that the FRONASA guerrillas failed to destroy the bridge, having been scared off by the presence of Uganda Army soldiers. At some point, the second UA counter-attack was launched from Rubindi through Rubaya, but easily defeated by the 2nd Battalion.

As Mayunga's force was reorganizing in Mbarara, the Uganda Army's defenses in the west were disrupted due to internal chaos. On 10-11 March, Uganda and its allies were defeated by the Tanzanians in the Battle of Lukaya on the eastern axis. The Uganda Army subsequently began to collapse. Many UA soldiers stationed in the Lukaya area deserted and fled westward, looting on the way. Western cities such as Masindi were plundered by the fleeing troops. Abdu Kisuule, the commander of the Artillery & Signals Regiment, returned to Masindi after the Battle of Lukaya, and attempted to restore some order.

On 25 March 1979, Uganda Army troops under Tizihwayo launched another attack at Rugaando in the Mbarara area. The UA contingent, including Tiger Regiment troops, had come all the way from Fort Portal, and began its assault without sufficient reconnaissance. As the Ugandans probed the Tanzanian positions at Rugaando, manned by 80th Battalion, they were thus unaware that the Task Force Battalion had been stationed on the 80th Battalion's flank. Eventually, a TPDF tank of the 80th Battalion reversed in order to resupply its ammunition; the nearby Tanzanian infantrymen believed that the tank was in full retreat and began to withdraw from the battlefield. Just as the Ugandans were making progress against 80th Battalion, however, the Task Force Battalion under Kessy counter-attacked and routed Tizihwayo's troops. Even though FRONASA troops only arrived at the scene after the battle's end, they were celebrated by the local civilians as the ones who had defeated the Amin loyalists.

After the fighting for Mbarara's surroundings had ceased, the Uganda Army attempted to attack the Tanzanians' rear positions by retaking the Kikagati area; however, Mayunga became aware of this flanking attempt and sent the 79th Battalion to intercept the Amin loyalists at the Ntungamo-Kafuunjo axis. At some point after the clash at Rugaando, a Tanzanian propaganda programme claimed that Tizihwayo was in contact with FRONASA rebels and planning on defecting. He was subsequently arrested and executed by Uganda's intelligence agency, the State Research Bureau (SRB).

=== Tanzanian advance into the Rwenzori Mountains ===
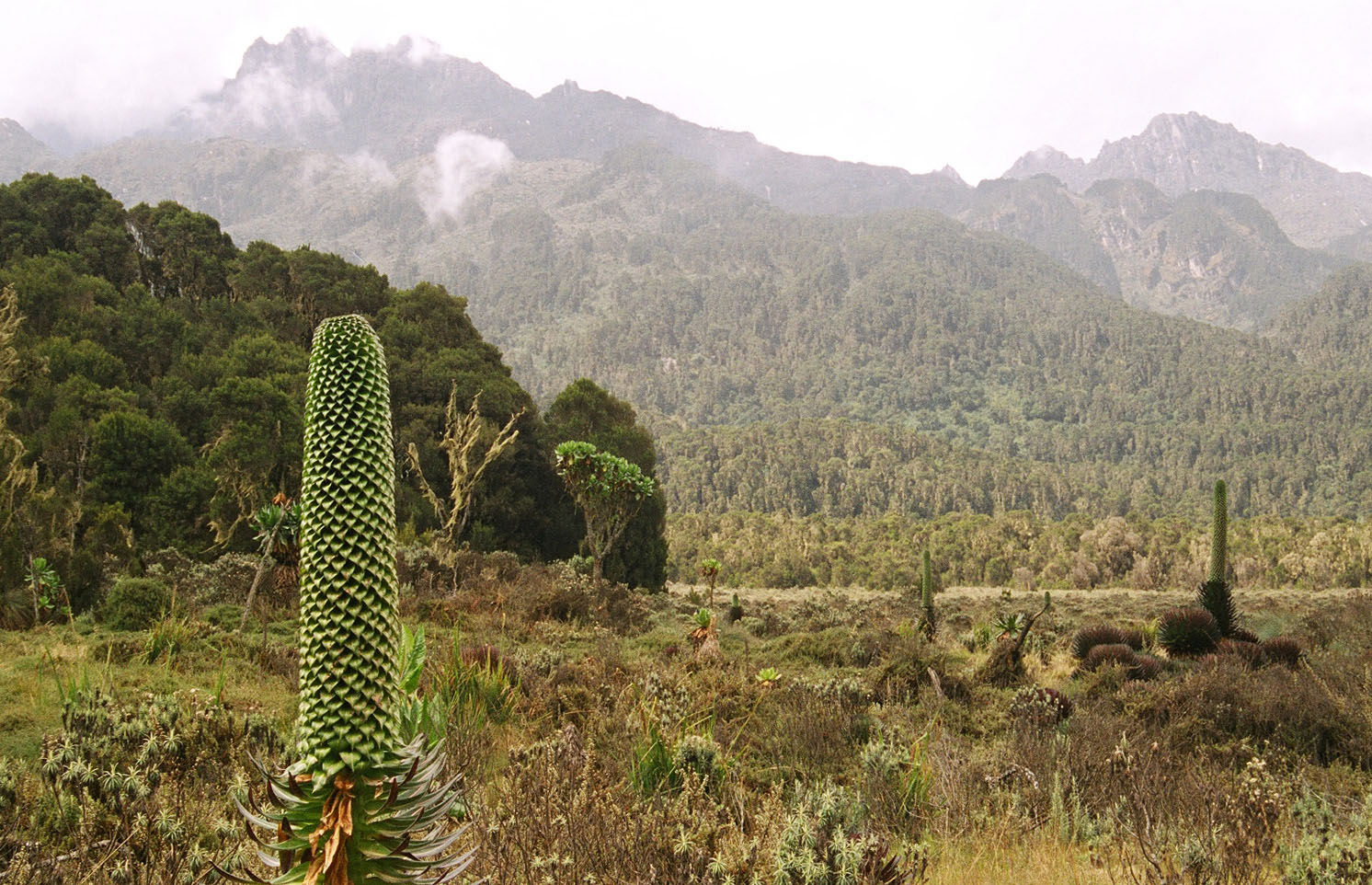
The Rwenzori Mountains were difficult to traverse for the Tanzania People's Defence Force's Task Force.

After the Moshi Conference during which the various anti-Amin rebel groups were unified as the Uganda National Liberation Front (UNLF), the TPDF troops finished their reorganization efforts at Mbarara and restarted their offensive. The Task Force began to advanced deeper into western Uganda, encountering Ugandan troops conducting rearguard defensive actions. The UA soldiers were generally on the retreat, but they set up many small ambushes to delay the Tanzanian advance. The Task Force also struggled with the terrain, as western Uganda is dominated by mountains and was subject to heavy rain during the western campaign. Mayunga's force moved through Ntungamo, Ishaka, and Kamwenge into the Rwenzori Mountains. The Minziro Brigade was sent to secure the Kilembe Mines; there, the TPDF soldiers encountered no resistance and were instead greeted by a large reception. By night, most of those present had gotten drunk, and Brigadier Kitete held an emotional speech about forgiveness, referencing that Kilembe Mines employees had blown up Tanzania's Kyaka Bridge during the Kagera invasion. Moved by the speech, one engineer admitted that he had helped to destroy the bridge; Kitete then quietly told one of his officers to "arrest the bastard". Four mine employees were ultimately arrested for their role in the Kyaka Bridge's destruction, though they were released a few months later.

When the 206th Brigade approached Kasese, they were fired upon by Uganda Army troops, but the attackers quickly fled. The town's population happily greeted the Tanzanians, with many buildings being adorned with the colors of Obote's Uganda People's Congress. At this point, the TPDF troops were next to the border of Zaire (present-day Democratic Republic of the Congo); securing it proved difficult. The Zairian border guards were undermanned, poorly paid, and isolated; they did not interfere with either Ugandan stragglers or the TPDF troops. Many Uganda Army soldiers exploited this to first flee across the border, and then launch raids from their new bases in Zaire into Tanzanian-occupied Ugandan territory. Among these UA forces were the remnants of Tizihwayo's troops. As the Zairian border guards did nothing to stop them, the TPDF responded to the raids by often chasing the UA raiders deep into Zairian territory. Zairian civilians were generally friendly and welcoming toward the TPDF troops. As the Tanzanians secured the border and Uganda Army troops fled the region, the separatist Rwenzururu movement exploited the unrest. It moved into areas vacated by Amin's followers, and captured weapons left behind by the Uganda Army. The insurgents reportedly captured "several truckloads" of weaponry from the Uganda Army. Thus, the movement was able to equip its troops, previously often limited to spears, with modern guns and mortars, and extend its territorial control. According to historian Derek R. Peterson, the Rwenzururu movement played an underappreciated role "in the ousting of Idi Amin in 1979".

After securing Kasese, the Task Force's main contingent continued its march toward Fort Portal; this part of the journey was highly taxing for the Tanzanian soldiers due to the terrain. Upon arriving at the city, the Task Force used its artillery to bomb the local barracks for one night. When the TPDF marched into Fort Portal on the next day, the Uganda Army garrison had fled. They left large quantities of arms and ammunition behind. (Note: Researchers Tom Cooper and Adrien Fontanellaz reported that the Task Force's 2nd Battalion clashed with the 2nd Paratrooper Battalion as it "approached Fort Portal", referencing Museveni's 1997 autobiography. However, Museveni's account states that the encounter between the Tanzanian 2nd Battalion and the Ugandan 2nd Paratrooper Battalion took place at Ishozi before the Battle of Gayaza Hills and the fall of Mbarara.) The local population had suffered under the Ugandan soldiers who had looted and raped, and when the Tanzanians discovered some SRB agents in hiding, the local civilians lynched one of them.

=== Meetup of the Task Force and 205th Brigade ===
From Fort Portal, the TPDF Task Force advanced to Hoima. It encountered no resistance on the way, and the terrain was also flatter allowing for easier travel along the main road. By this point, the Battle of Sembabule to the east had ended. The Tanzanian 205th Brigade under Brigadier Muhiddin Kimario had subsequently moved to Mubende and from there toward Hoima. On 11 April, the Ugandan capital, Kampala, fell to the TPDF's eastern army. When news about this event spread, the Uganda Army lost its remaining cohesion. In the western theatre, Artillery & Signals Regiment commander Abdu Kisuule claimed that he ordered all UA troops in the Bunyoro region to rally at Masindi, but instead "they all ran for their dear lives". Soon after, Kisuule also fled the city, fearing that could be the target of an assassination plot. He eventually surrendered to the UNLF in Kampala, and was sent back westward to act as a guide for the Tanzanians. Meanwhile, the Tanzanian 205th Brigade captured Hoima largely without resistance, aside of a small clash during which five Uganda Army soldiers were killed. The town had been plundered by Ugandan soldiers. Soon after the unit occupied Hoima, the Task Force also arrived at the city. The two units were initially unaware about each other's presence, and Task Force prepared to shell Hoima before being warned about the potential for a friendly fire incident over radio. Though the regular soldiers of the two forces were happy to see each other, Mayunga was displeased, feeling that the eastern army was interfering in his area of operations.

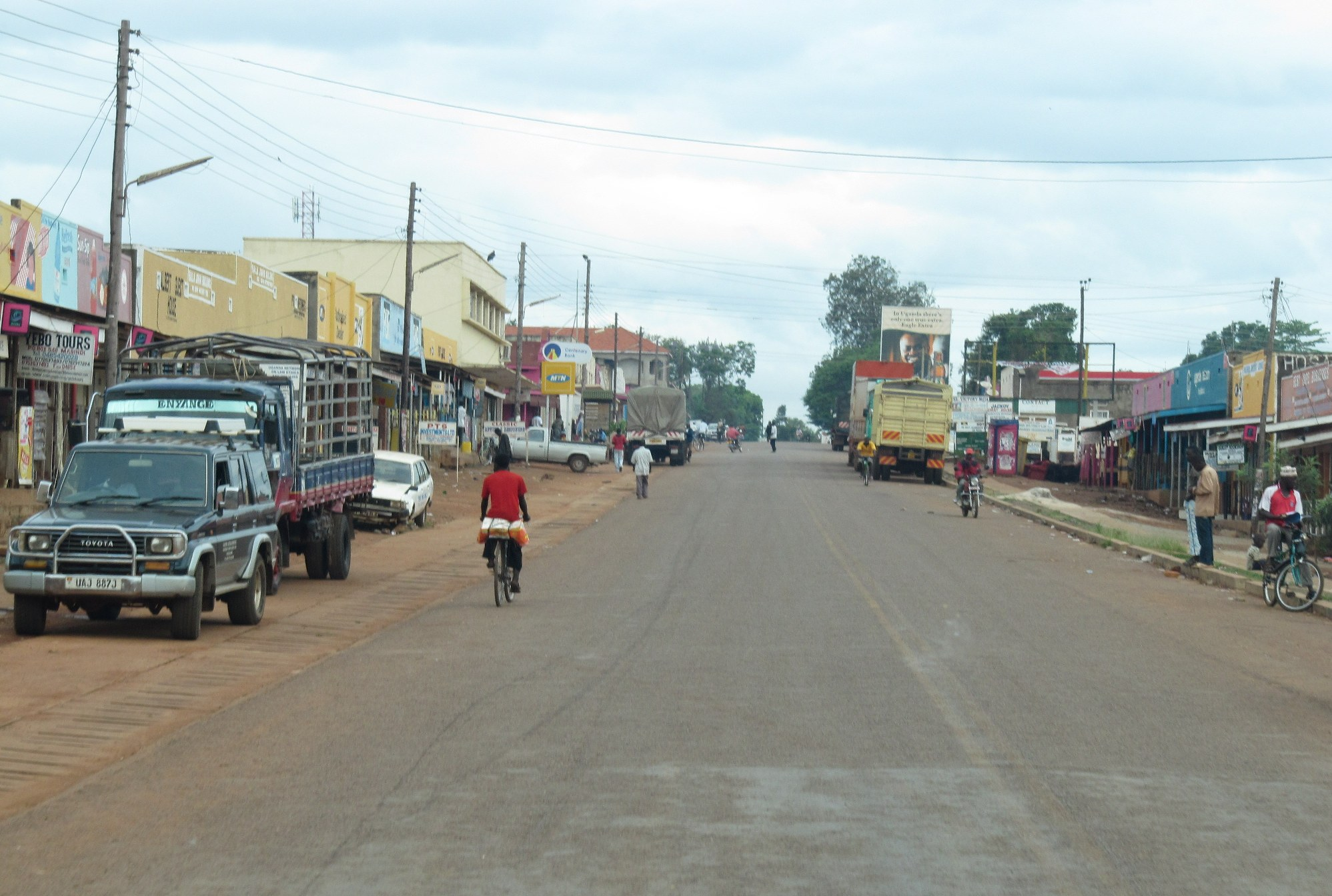
Masindi in 2010

Meanwhile, a large number of Uganda Army troops had retreated to Masindi. This gathering included Bernard Rwehururu's Suicide Battalion. When news about Hoima's fall reached Masindi, most of the remaining Ugandan troops panicked and fled for Kigumba. Believing that he had to delay the Tanzanian advance to ensure a more orderly retreat of the Uganda Army troops, Rwehururu rallied the Suicide Battalion and set up an ambush on the Masindi-Hoima Road. He chose Bulindi, (Note: Abdu Kisuule identified the ambush site as "Isimba" as well as the "killing ground at Lukondwa".) a location close to a small bridge directly south of Masindi. When the combined contingents of the Task Force and 205th Brigade proceeded to advance toward Masindi, Kisuule –by then acting as a TPDF guide– cautioned that the area ahead was well suited to an ambush. The Tanzanian commander reportedly did not heed his warning, and the advancing troops fell into Rwehururu's ambush. According to Rwehururu, the battle at Bulindi lasted for six hours. (Note: Rwehururu claimed that the Tanzanians and their allies lost 40 men at Bulindi, and were temporarily forced to retreat. Steven Isaac Mtemihonda—who commanded the 206th Brigade's 14th Battalion—later stated that the TPDF lost three soldiers during the ambush. Kisuule claimed that "we lost about six soldiers" in this confrontation. According to Avirgan and Honey, the battle resulted in no losses on either side; the TPDF was mainly delayed because one of its tanks accidentally drove into a ditch during the exchange of fire, and could not be pulled out. It had to be recovered with specialised equipment two weeks later.) When the Tanzanians moved into Masindi on the following day, it was deserted and looted; once again, the Amin loyalists had left behind much equipment. From Masindi, Rwehururu's Suicide Battalion retreated to Zaire.

== Aftermath ==
After Masindi, the Task Force and 20th Brigade had different targets; the former was supposed to secure the West Nile District to the northwest, while the latter was headed for Gulu. However, both forces had to cross the Nile at the Karuma Falls bridge. The Tanzanian commanders agreed that the 205th Brigade would move out first, and secure the crossing; the Task Force brigades would follow in its path. After a two-day delay due to fuel shortages, the 205th Brigade advanced to Karuma Falls, capturing the crossing after a short battle with a company of UA soldiers on 17 May. The TPDF soldiers left behind a garrison to guard the bridge, and continued their advance to Gulu. The Task Force went on to secure the West Nile District which was the last area of Uganda to remain outside Tanzanian control.

Combat operations in Uganda continued until 3 June, when Tanzanian forces reached the Sudanese border and eliminated the last resistance. In the same month, disputes between FRONASA and Kikosi Maalum fighters at Bushenyi in the west resulted in the massacre of over 100 civilians. Remants of Uganda Army troops reorganized as insurgents and continued to launch cross-border attacks from Zaire; some Uganda Army soldiers who had served under Tizihwayo's command even ended up joining the Allied Democratic Forces in the 1990s. Likewise, the Rwenzururu movement continued its rebellion and even captured Kasese and surrounding areas in 1980. Uganda gradually fell into factional infighting and civil war. The TPDF withdrew from the country in 1981. Museveni's forces emerged victorious in the Ugandan civil war; he became President of Uganda in 1986.

In 2009, the Ugandan government officially recognized Rwenzururu as a subnational kingdom with Charles Mumbere as its king.
