= Zawadi Madawili =

- Military career
- Allegiance: Tanzania
- Branch: Tanzania People's Defence Force
- Rank: Major general

Zawadi Madawili is a retired Tanzanian army officer.

Madawili was one of the first female officers of the Tanzania People's Defence Force, ranking as a lieutenant in 1975. She held the rank of brigadier-general in 2003 when she reported on her country's progress within the United Nations Programme for Action to eradicate the economic effects of conflict from the continent. Madawili emphasised the efforts made to instil a sense of activism in Tanzanian women to implement the programme. Madawili reached the rank of major general before her retirement. In October 2017 she was appointed to the country's Public Service Remuneration Board, which had been established to set the level of pay for civil servants.
