= Jacob John Mkunda =

Tanzanian military officer

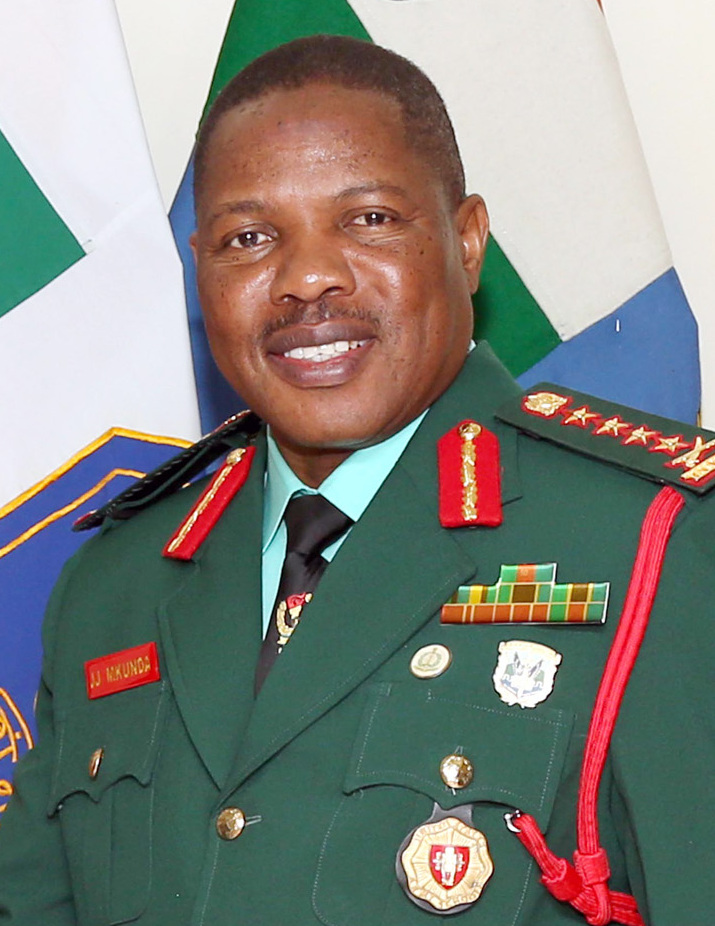
- Mkunda in 2023
- Military career
- Allegiance: Tanzania
- Branch: Tanzania People's Defence Force (TPDF)
- Service years: 2022–Present
- Rank: General
- Commands: Chief of Defence Forces

Jacob John Mkunda is a Tanzanian military officer who currently serves as Chief of the Tanzanian People's Defence Force since 30 June 2022.

== Early life ==
Mkunda attended the Ruvu Secondary School, where he played on the football team and was involved in student government.

== Career ==
In February 2020, Mkunda, at the rank of brigadier-general, led the Tanzanian People's Defence Forces' (TPDF) 202nd Western Brigade in Katavi Region in an operation to suppress rebel activity in refugee settlements, leading to weapons seizures and several arrests. By 2021 he was chief of the TPDF's training staff.

On 30 June 2022 Mkunda was appointed Chief of Defence Forces, replacing retiring General Venance Salvatory Mabeyo.

Military offices
Preceded by Venance Salvatory Mabeyo	Chief of Tanzanian People's Defence Force; 2022-present	Succeeded by Incumbent
