= Lugalo Military Base =

- Near Kinondoni District, Dar es Salaam in Tanzania

Location
- Location of Lugalo Military Base
- Coordinates: 6°44′47″S 39°13′5″E

Lugalo Military Camp is a large installation of the Tanzania People's Defence Force located in the city of Dar es Salaam along the Bagamoyo Road.

It was established during the British colonial era as a camp for the King's African Rifles (KAR), after the seizure of Tanganyika – German East Africa – from Germany during the First World War. In 1917 significant expansion of the KAR began, with the creation of 6th Battalion, later 1/6th Battalion, seemingly from the Schutztruppe of the former German East Africa. The battalion was disbanded in January 1919. A successor 6th Battalion KAR was formed in February 1919, becoming the 6th (Tanganyika Territory) Battalion in 1924.

The 7th Battalion KAR was formed from the Zanzibar Armed Constabulary and the Mafia Constabulary.

In September 1939 the headquarters of the Southern Brigade of East Africa Force was located in Dar es Salaam, under Brigadier Charles Fowkes. The headquarters, 6th Battalion KAR (Tanganyika Territory) and Southern Area Signals were all in the city. On 19 September 1939 Southern Brigade was redesignated 2nd East African Infantry Brigade. In October 1939 the Battalion was re-designated 1/6th Battalion when a duplicate unit, 2/6th, was formed.

The camp was named "Colito Barracks" after the victory of the Tanganyika forces over the Italians in the Battle of Colito in Ethiopia on May 19, 1941, during the East African campaign of World War II.

Colours were presented to the KAR at Colito Barracks on 16 September 1955 by the Governor and Commander-in-Chief: H. E. Sir Edward Twining, GCMG BME.

Captain C.A. Veys of the Royal Army Medical Corps, the Regimental Medical Officer of the 6th Battalion KAR, described the cantonment in 1960 as:

The K.A.R. cantonment is situated some eight miles out of Dar es Salaam close by a very warm and buoyant Indian Ocean, refreshingly cool in the cold season, rather like taking a warm bath in the hot season. The camp is five years old, the quarters are modern tropical bungalows in design, and the officers' mess with a superb view and setting on top of Observation Hill is probably the best in the command. The European and African population of the station totals about 1,500.

The Tanganyika Rifles mutiny of January 1964 began there through a soldiers' strike. Following the Zanzibar Revolution, the Tanganyika Rifles mutinied. The 1st Battalion seized key points in Dar es Salaam on the 19th, deposing their officers and sending them to neighbouring Kenya; on the 20th, the 2nd Battalion, in Tabora, joined the mutiny. The entire force had now rebelled, with the British High Commissioner briefly detained and most of the strategic points in the capital held by the mutineers.

After appeals from the President, Julius Nyerere, the United Kingdom dispatched an aircraft carrier, HMS Centaur from Aden, with a force from the garrison there, to stand off Dar es Salaam. On the British government receiving the request in writing from Nyerere, a company of Royal Marines from No. 45 Commando were landed by helicopter in Dar es Salaam on the 25th, assaulting and quickly capturing Colito Barracks and the 1st Battalion; many of the mutineers quickly surrendered after a guardroom was destroyed by an anti-tank missile.

After landings later that day, including a small number of armoured cars of the 16th/5th The Queen's Royal Lancers, most of the remaining mutineers had likewise surrendered.

After independence, the name of the camp was changed to commemorate the victory of the Wahehe tribe under Chief Mkwawa over the German colonial army of the Schutztruppe at Lugalo on August 17, 1891.

Inside the camp is the Lugalo Military Hospital, which serves as a referral hospital for health services in the Tanzanian military.
