= Silas Mayunga =

- Died: 6 August 2011; Delhi, India
- Military career
- Allegiance: Tanganyika; Tanzania
- Branch: Tanganyika Rifles; Tanzania People's Defence Force
- Rank: Lieutenant General
- Nicknames: "The artillery wizard" "Mti Mkavu" (Swahili: dry tree)
- Commands: 206th Brigade TPDF; Task Force TPDF
- Conflicts: Uganda–Tanzania War; Invasion of Kagera; Battle of Gayaza Hills; Western Uganda campaign of 1979

Silas Paul Mayunga (6 August 2011) was a Tanzanian military officer and diplomat.

== Biography ==
Mayunga served in the Tanganyika Rifles as a second lieutenant and was stationed in Lugalo. During the Tanganyika Rifles mutiny of January 1964 he was in Tabora.

In October 1978 Uganda, ruled by Idi Amin, invaded and occupied the Kagera Salient in northern Tanzania, initiating the Uganda–Tanzania War. Mayunga, serving as a brigadier in the Tanzania People's Defence Force (TPDF), led a brigade into Kagera after the Uganda Army withdrew. The TPDF invaded Uganda in early 1979, and Mayunga commanded the 206th Brigade as it advanced into the southwestern portion of the country and seized Mbarara. During the war his troops commonly referred to him as "the artillery wizard". After leading forces into Uganda, his men nicknamed him "Mti Mkavu" (Swahili: dry tree) in reference to his perceived durability. Following the capture of Mbarara and Masaka, the TPDF halted to reorganise. On March 21 Mayunga was promoted to major general and given charge of a newly formed "Task Force", a unit consisting of the 206th Brigade and the Minziro Brigade, which was semi-autonomous from the TPDF's main invasion force, the 20th Division, in southeastern Uganda. While the 20th Division attacked Kampala and other major locations, the Task Force advanced north into western Uganda in the following months, engaging Ugandan troops conducting rearguard defensive actions. On 3 June 1979 Mayunga accompanied the Minziro Brigade as it secured the last portion of unoccupied Ugandan territory along the Sudanese border, ending the war. At the frontier, he delivered a short victory speech to his soldiers, telling them, "You've taught Idi Amin a lesson he'll never forget." He was later awarded by the new Ugandan government for his role in overthrowing Amin's regime.

In 1990 Mayunga was appointed as an envoy to Ghana.

Mayunga died on 6 August 2011 at the age of 71 in Delhi, India while undergoing medical treatment. His body was repatriated to Tanzania two days later. Uhuru Stadium in Bukoba was renamed Mayunga Stadium in his honour.
