= Davis Mwamunyange =

Commander of the Tanzanian Armed Forces

General Davis Mwamunyange
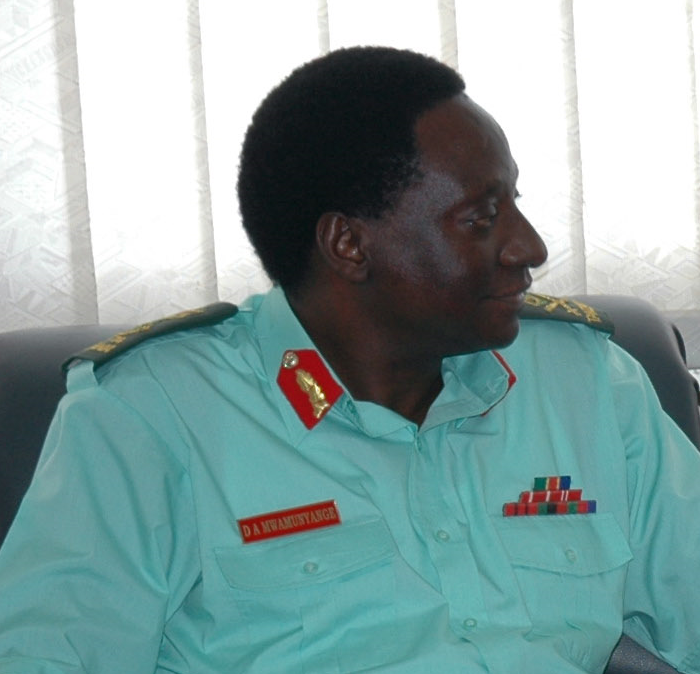
- Born: 1959 (age 66–67); Mbeya, Mbeya Region, Tanzania
- Military career
- Allegiance: Tanzania
- Rank: General
- Commands: Chief of the Defence Force
- Conflicts: Operation Democracy in Comoros

General Davis Mwamunyange (born 1959) was the Chief of Defence Forces of the Tanzania People's Defence Force. He was appointed by the Tanzanian President Jakaya Kikwete in September 2007. Before his appointment he was the Chief of General Staff.

Military offices
Preceded by George Waitara	Chief of Tanzanian People's Defence Force; 2007-2017	Succeeded by Venance Salvatory Mabeyo
