= Venance Salvatory Mabeyo =

Tanzanian military officer

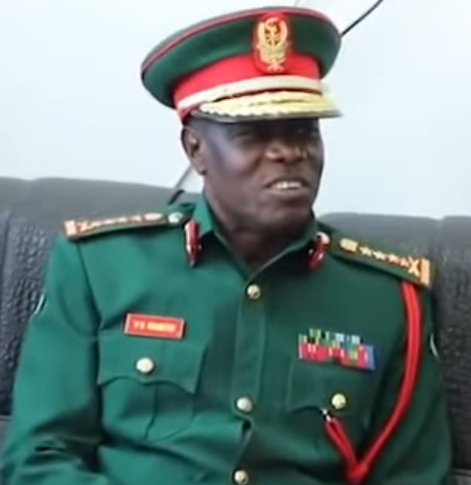
- Mabeyo in 2021
- Born: 1 July 1956 (age 70); Busega District, Tanganyika Territory
- Military career
- Allegiance: Tanzania
- Branch: Tanzania People's Defence Force (TPDF)
- Service years: 1978–2022
- Rank: General
- Commands: Defense Forces Chief of the TPDF
- Conflicts: Uganda–Tanzania War; Insurgency in Cabo Delgado
- Other work: Head of the Ngorongoro Conservation Area Authority

Venance Salvatory Mabeyo, also known as Vicent Mabeyo, is a retired Tanzanian military officer who served as the eighth Defense Forces Chief to lead the Tanzania People's Defense Force (TPDF). He was appointed by President John Magufuli on 6 February 2017. After Magufuli's death in March 2021, Mabeyo played a major role in ensuring a smooth transition of power to the new President, Samia Suluhu Hassan. He retired from the TPDF in June 2022.

== Biography ==
=== Early life and career ===
Mabeyo was born on 1 July 1956. After completing secondary school in 1977, Mabeyo joined the Tanzanian National Service in 1978. When the Uganda–Tanzania War broke out in late 1978, he was immediately drafted. He formally joined the Tanzania People's Defense Force (TPDF) on 1 January 1979, attended the student officer course, and received a commission in 1980 as a Sub Lieutenant.

Mabeyo attended various military courses at home and abroad, some of which took place in Kenya, India, Canada and the United States. Over time, he held various positions in the TPDF, including Military Attaché in Rwanda, Assistant Chief of Army Staff, Director of Security and Recognition, and Head of Security and Recognition Headquarters. By 2015, he was Chief of Tanzania Defence Intelligence; in this position, he ordered research about the radicalization of youth in Tanzania, particularly in regards to Islamic terrorism. In 2016, he was promoted to TPDF chief of staff.

=== Defense Forces Chief of the TPDF ===
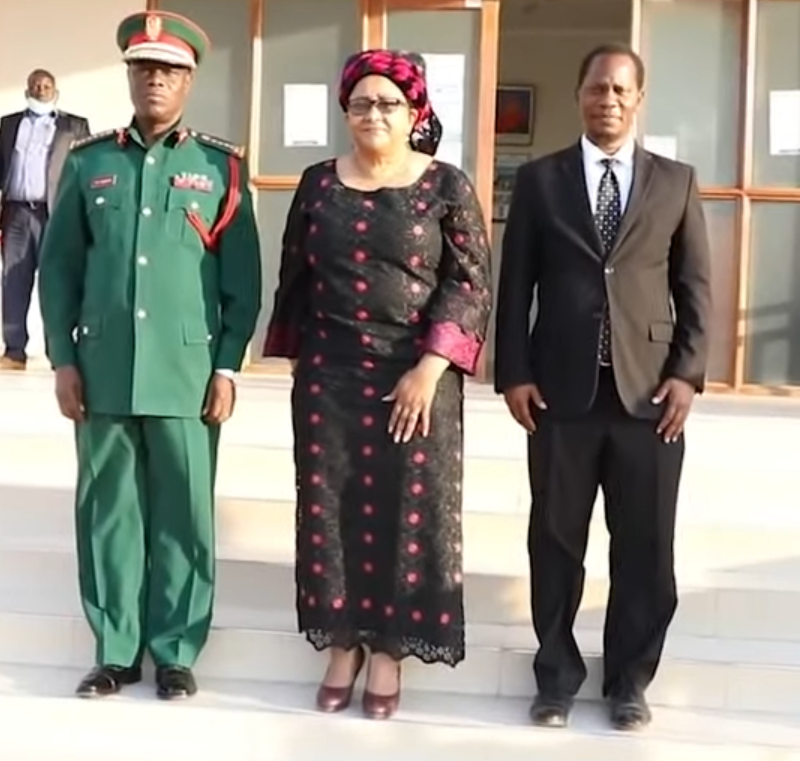
Mabeyo with Tanzanian Defense Minister Stergomena Tax (center) in 2021

Mabeyo was promoted from Lieutenant General to General and appointed Defense Forces Chief of the TPDF in February 2017, succeeding Davis Mwamunyange in this position. In February 2019, Mabeyo personally visited Njombe Region to assist in the investigation of the murder of ten children who had probably been ritually tortured and killed. A few months later, he faced criticism by opposition MPs, after stating that he would investigate seditious remarks by politicians.

In May 2020, the TPDF under Mabeyo deployed troops to the Tanzanian-Mozambican border to counter raids of Islamist rebels that were waging the insurgency in Cabo Delgado. He would later describe the operations against the Islamist insurgents as being especially challenging, as they used civilian sympathizers to hide "amongst us".

Tanzanian President John Magufuli unexpectedly died in March 2021, leaving Samia Suluhu Hassan as his de jure designated successor. However, her position was initially tenuous, and there we reportedly disputes over her appointment within the governing Chama Cha Mapinduzi (CCM) party. Some Magufuli loyalists allegedly wanted to prevent her from becoming President, and there were fears about a military-backed coup d'état. According to various sources, including CCM insiders, gathered by The EastAfrican, Mabeyo strongly defended the constitutional stipulations regarding the transfer of presidential powers and supported Hassan. This made him one of Hassan's strongest allies and ensured a smooth power transition. Mabeyo later held a speech at the funeral of Magufuli, using the opportunity to honor the late President and expressing the TPDF's loyalty to Hassan.

He officially retired from the TPDF on his 66th birthday on 30 June 2022. President Hassan subsequently appointed Mabeyo head of the Ngorongoro Conservation Area Authority.

== Personal life ==
Venance Salvatory Mabeyo's wife is named Christina. He had at least one son, Nelson Venance Mabeyo, who was a pilot and died in a plane crash in 2019.

He is a practicing Roman Catholic Christian.

== Awards and decorations ==
Mabeyo has been awarded various medals.

Ribbon	Medal	Native Name
	TPDF 20th Anniversary Medal	Nishani ya Miaka Ishirini ya JWTZ (Swahili)
	Medal of Long Service	Nishani ya Utumishi Mrefu (Swahili)
	TPDF 40th Anniversary Medal	Nishani ya Miaka Arobaini ya JWTZ (Swahili)
	Medal of Exemplary Service	Nishani ya Utumishi Uliotukuka (Swahili)
	Anjouan Medal	Nishani ya Anjouan (Swahili)
	50th Year of Independence Anniversary Medal	Nishani ya Miaka 50 ya Uhuru (Swahili)
	50th Year of Union Anniversary Medal	Nishani ya Miaka 50 ya Mungano (Swahili)
	TPDF 50th Anniversary Medal	Nishani ya Miaka Hamsini ya JWTZ (Swahili)
	60th Year of Independence Anniversary Medal	Nishani ya Miaka 60 ya Uhuru (Swahili)

Military offices
Preceded by Davis Mwamunyange	Defense Forces Chief of the Tanzanian People's Defence Force; 2017-2022	Succeeded by Jacob John Mkunda
