= Tanzanian Armed Forces uniforms =

The Tanzanian Defense Force uses a British Army Style ceremonial outfit, and a jungle camouflage. The Identification between different branches in the Tanzania Army depends on the color of the stripe on the shoulders and the color of the beret. Due to shortages of uniform suppliers in the past, there is still some variations in uniforms between ranks in the Army however, these are the most common issue.

From the late 1970s until at least the early 2000s the camouflage issued was the British-style Disruptive Pattern Material, often of Canadian origin.

== Army ==
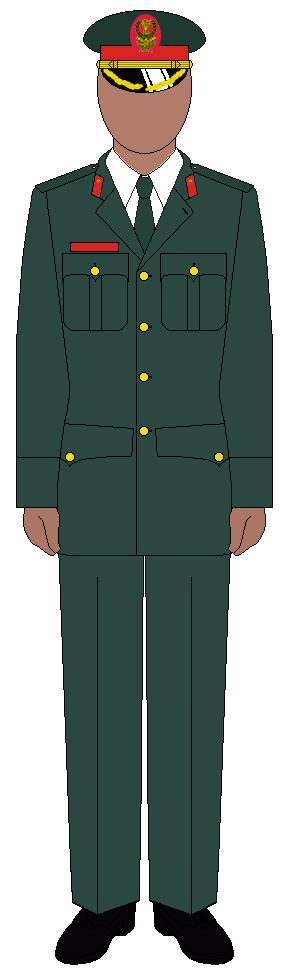
General Official

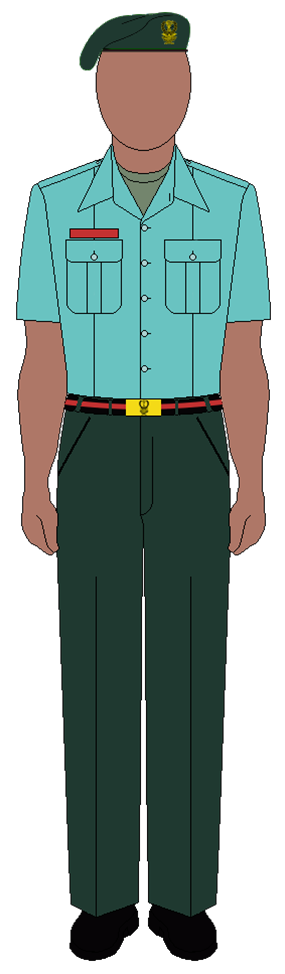
Officer Everyday Outfit

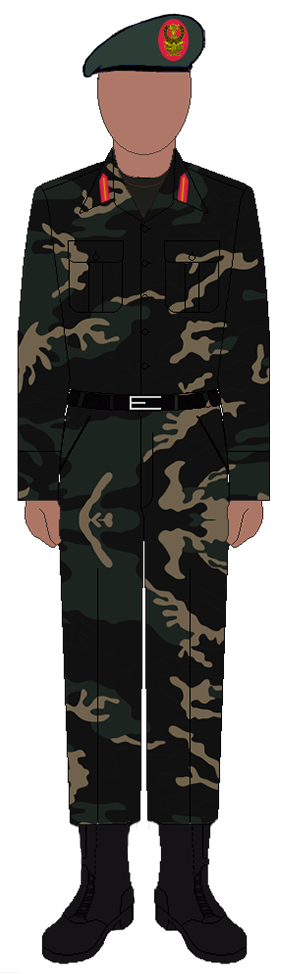
General Camouflage

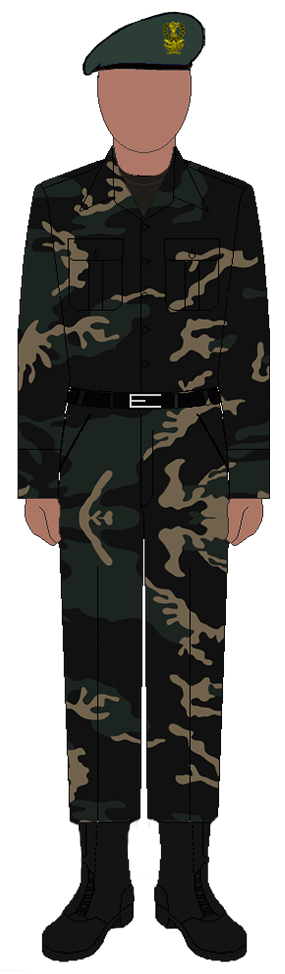
Officer Camouflage

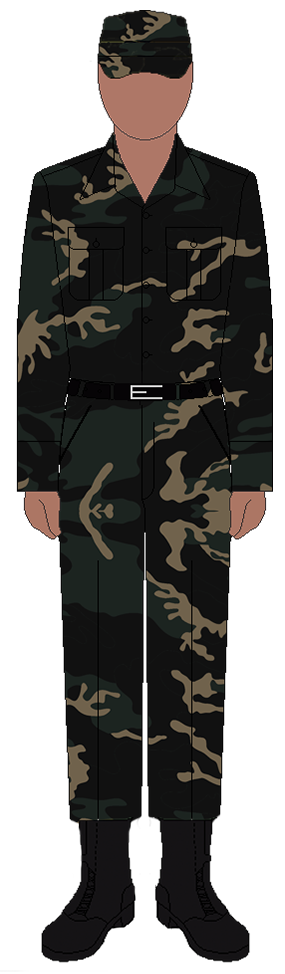
Field Unit Camouflage

== Navy ==
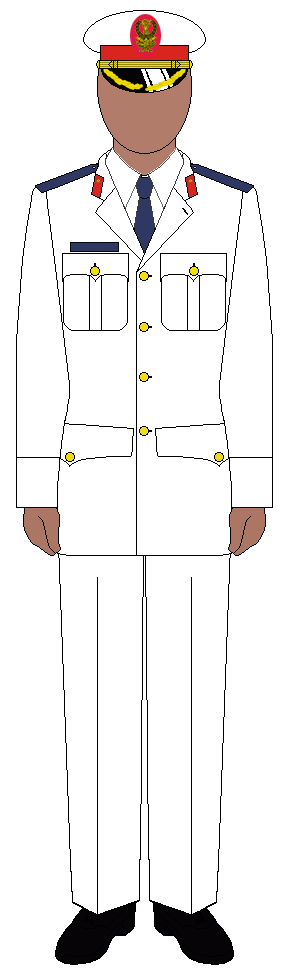
General Ceremonial

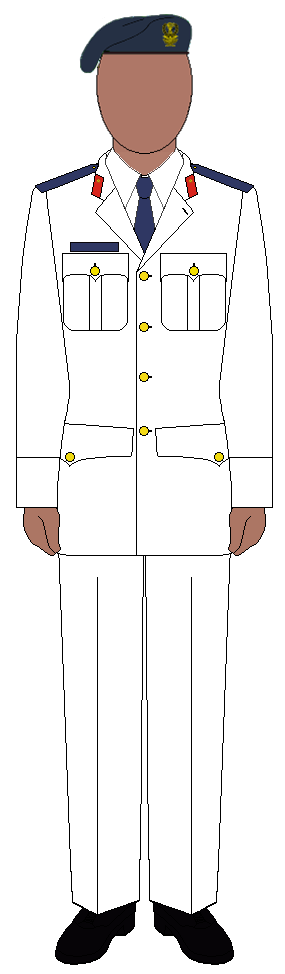
General Alternate (Beret)

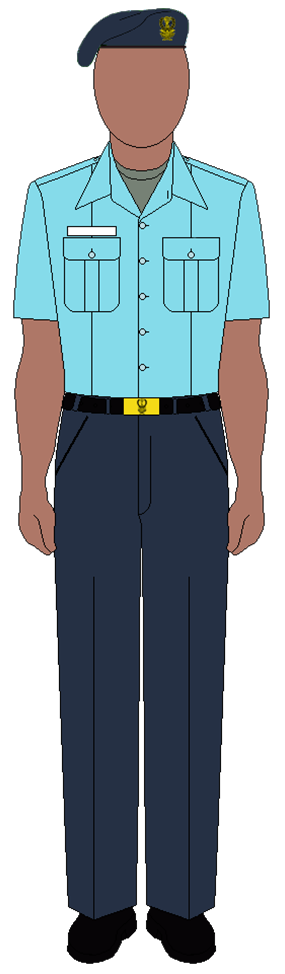
Officer Everyday Outfit

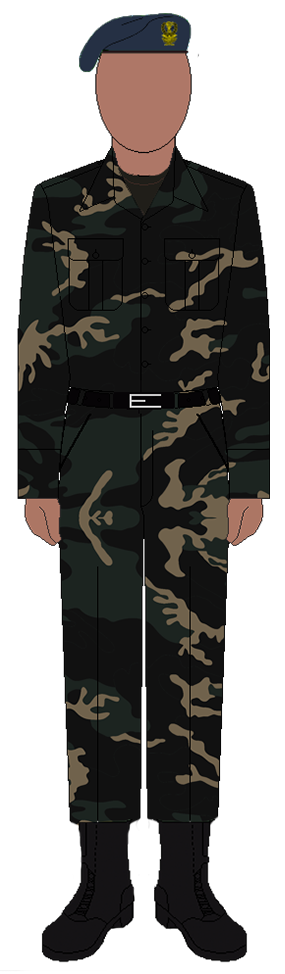
Navy Unit in Camo

== Airforce ==
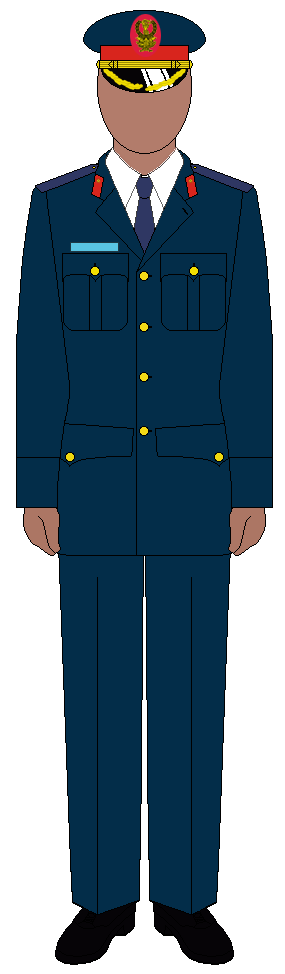
General Ceremonial

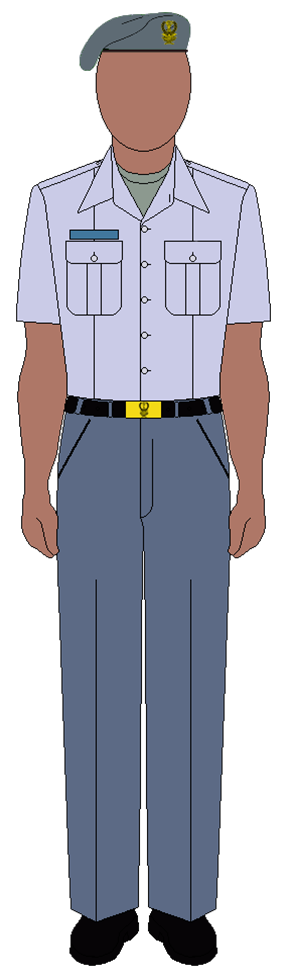
Officer Everyday Outfit

== Army Ceremonial ==
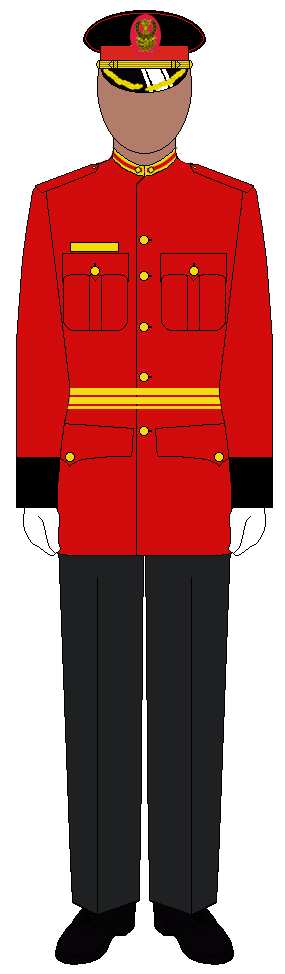
General Ceremonial

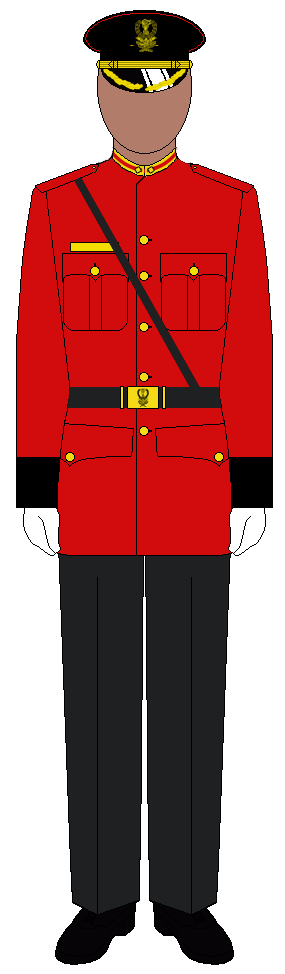
Officer Ceremonial

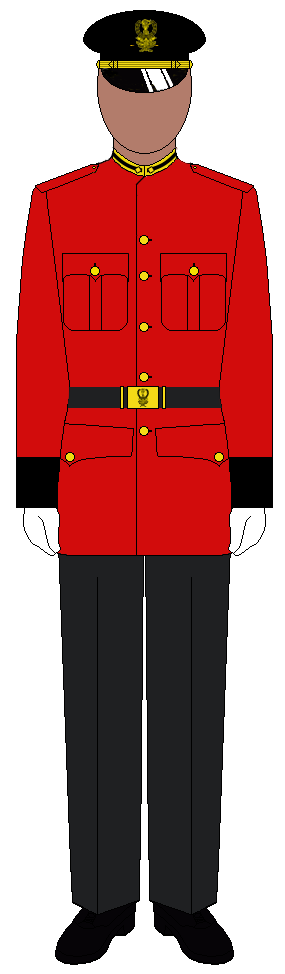
General Infantry Ceremonial

== See also ==
- Tanzania People's Defence Force
- Tanzania Naval Command
- Tanzania Air Force Command
