= Tanganyika Rifles =

Sole regiment in the Tanganyikan army (1961–64)

- Founded: 1961
- Disbanded: 1964
- Headquarters: Dar es Salaam

Leadership
- Commander-in-Chief: Julius Nyerere
- Commander, Tanganyika Rifles: Brigadier Patrick Sholto Douglas

The Tanganyika Rifles was the sole regiment in the Tanganyikan army, from 1961 to 1964.

== History ==
With the independence of Tanganyika in December 1961, the two battalions of the King's African Rifles which had been raised in the colony were transferred to the newly independent nation. These were the 6th (Tanganyika Territory) Battalion (becoming the 1st Tanganyika Rifles), located at Colito Barracks in Dar-es-Salaam and the 26th (Tanganyika Territory) Battalion (becoming the 2nd Tanganyika Rifles).

== Mutiny ==
Despite having become part of the Tanganyikan military, the bulk of the officers of the regiment were still British, as had been the case in the King's African Rifles. In January 1964, following the Zanzibar Revolution, the regiment mutinied. The 1st Battalion seized key points in Dar es Salaam on the 19th, deposing their officers and sending them to neighbouring Kenya; on the 20th, the 2nd Battalion, in Tabora, joined the mutiny. The entire country's military had now rebelled, with the British High Commissioner briefly detained and most of the strategic points in the capital held by the mutineers.

After appeals from the President, Julius Nyerere, the United Kingdom dispatched an aircraft carrier, HMS Centaur from Aden, with a force from the garrison there, to stand off Dar es Salaam. On the British government receiving the request in writing from Nyerere, a company of Royal Marines from No. 45 Commando were landed by helicopter in Dar es Salaam on the 25th, assaulting and quickly capturing the barracks holding the 1st Battalion; many of the mutineers quickly surrendered after a guardroom was destroyed by an anti-tank missile.

After landings later that day, including a small number of armoured cars of the 16th/5th The Queen's Royal Lancers, most of the remaining mutineers had likewise surrendered; the 2nd Battalion had not been engaged, but had offered to surrender after hearing of the events in Dar es Salaam; a party of Marines travelled there and secured the barracks the next day.

Within twenty-four hours of the initial landings, and a week of the mutiny, the men of the 1st battalion were dismissed and the regiment effectively ceased to exist. The regiment was never reformed; after the union of Tanganyika with Zanzibar later that year, the previously existing army was formally disbanded, and the Tanzania People's Defence Force was formed in September 1964, firmly under local civilian control. Many of the African officers of the 1st Battalion, and the officers and men of the 2nd, were incorporated into the new force.

== See also ==
- 1960 Force Publique mutinies
