= Tanzania People's Defence Force =

Armed forces of Tanzania

- Jeshi la Ulinzi la Wananchi wa Tanzania (Swahili)
- Emblem of Tanzania People's Defence Force
- Founded: 12 December 1962; 63 years ago
- Service branches: Tanzanian Army; Tanzania Naval Command; Tanzania Air Force
- Headquarters: Dar es Salaam, Tanzania
- Website: Official website

Leadership
- Commander-in-Chief: Samia Suluhu Hassan
- Minister of Defence and National Service: Stergomena Tax
- Chief of Defence Force: General Jacob John Mkunda

Personnel
- Military age: 18–62
- Conscription: 2 years
- Active personnel: 25,000 (ranked 84)

Expenditure
- Budget: $2.2 billion (2024)
- Percent of GDP: 1.4% (2024 est.)

Industry
- Foreign suppliers: Brazil; China; Czech Republic; India; Indonesia; Hungary; Russia; South Africa; Turkey; Ukraine; United Kingdom; United States; Vietnam

Related articles
- History: World War II (1939–1945); Uganda–Tanzania War (1978–1979); Mozambican Civil War; 2008 invasion of Anjouan; M23 rebellion; Insurgency in Cabo Delgado
- Ranks: Military ranks of Tanzania

The Tanzania People's Defence Force (TPDF) (Swahili: Jeshi la Ulinzi la Wananchi wa Tanzania, JWTZ) is the military force of the United Republic of Tanzania. It was established in September 1964, following a mutiny by the former colonial military force, the Tanganyika Rifles. From its inception, it was ingrained in the troops of the new TPDF that they were a people's force under civilian control. Unlike some of its neighbouring countries, Tanzania has never suffered a coup d'état or civil war.

The TPDF's mission is to defend Tanzania and every Tanzanian, especially the people and their political ideology. Conscripts are obligated to serve 2 years as of 2004.

== History ==
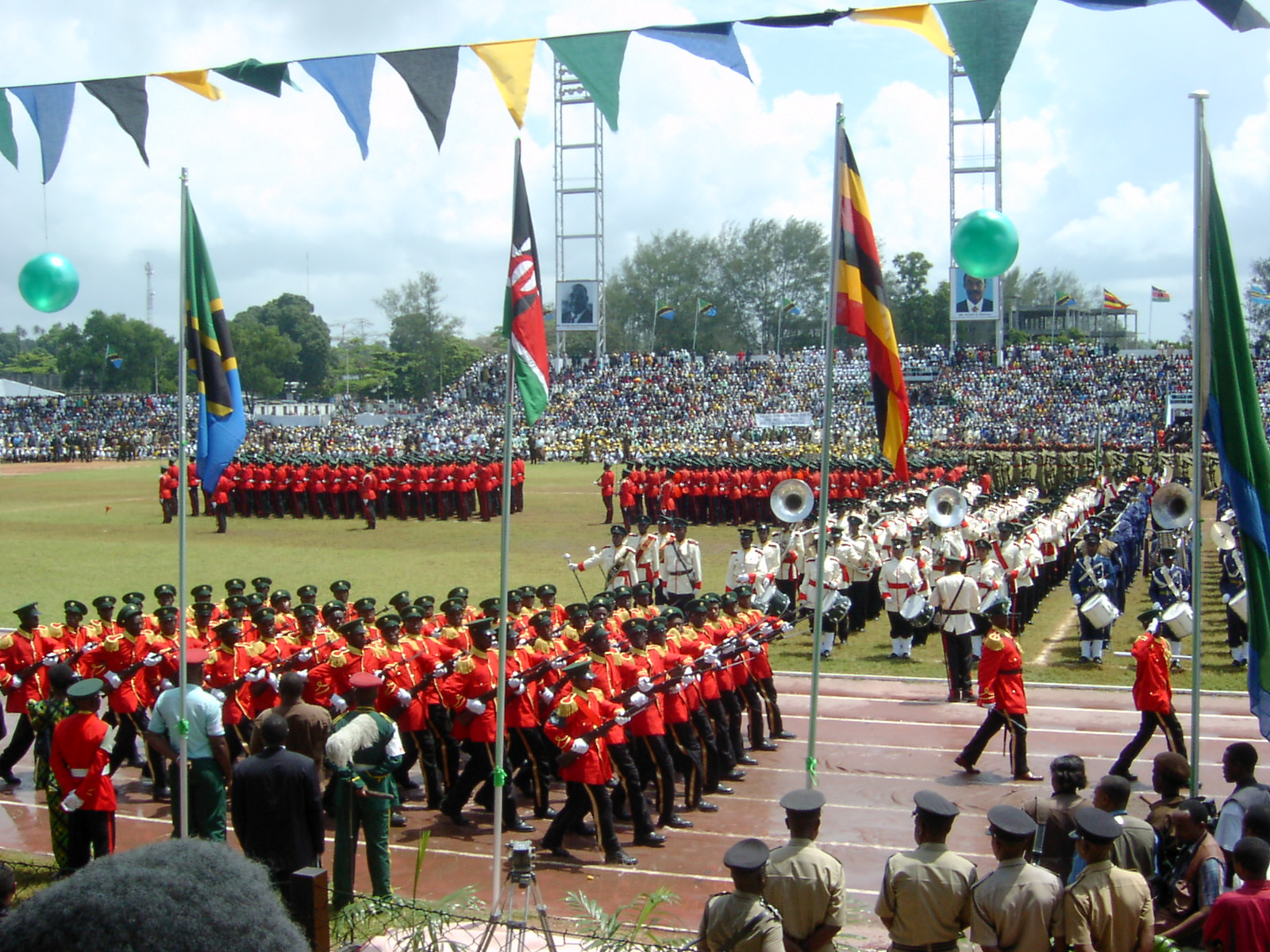
Zanzibar, 12 Jan. 2004, celebration of 40 years of the revolution

After an aborted mutiny in January 1964, the existing army was disbanded. The new force was titled the 'Tanganyika Military Force', from 25 January 1964 - 26 April 1964. The Tanzanian government concluded that the former British model was not appropriate for the needs of an independent African state. Fresh recruits were sourced from the Tanganyika African National Union youth wing. After the merge of Tanganyika and Zanzibar, the force was renamed the United Republic Military Force on 27 April 1964.

For the first few years of the TPDF, the army was even smaller than the disbanded 2,000-strong Tanganyika Rifles, the air force was minuscule, and no navy had yet been formed. It appears that the new TPDF had three battalions by August 1965, stationed at Nachingwea, Colito Barracks (now called Lugalo) five miles outside Dar es Salaam, and Tabora, plus the yet to be fully integrated Zanzibari force of about 1,000. However the army was four battalions strong by 1967.

From 1964 to 1974, the TPDF was commanded by Mrisho S.H. Sarakikya, trained at the Royal Military Academy Sandhurst, who was promoted from lieutenant to brigadier in 1964 and became the force's first commander. He was succeeded by Major General Abdallah Twalipo in 1974. Twalipo was still a major general in 1975, but then promoted to lieutenant general by 1978 and then later full general.

In 1972, the International Institute for Strategic Studies (IISS) listed the army with 10,000 personnel, four infantry battalions, 20 Type 59 main battle tanks, 14 Type 62 light tanks, some BTR-40 and BTR-152 armoured personnel carriers, and Soviet field artillery and Chinese mortars. 'Spares [were] short and not all equipment was serviceable.'

War broke out between Uganda and Tanzania in October 1978, with several Ugandan attacks across the border culminating in an invasion of the Kagera Salient. President Julius Nyerere ordered Tanzania to undertake full mobilisation for war. In a few weeks, the Tanzanian army was expanded from less than 40,000 troops to over 150,000, including about 40,000 militiamen as well as members of the police, prison services, and the national service. Fighting in December was mostly limited to "trench warfare" along the border, marked by sporadic clashes and air raids. By early January 1979 all Ugandan troops had been ejected from Kagera.

Nyerere decided that Tanzanian forces should occupy southern Uganda as revenge for the devastation wrought by Ugandan troops in his country and to incite a rebellion against Ugandan dictator Idi Amin. The Tanzanians launched their offensive in mid-February 1979. Major General David Musuguri was appointed commander of the TPDF's 20th Division and tasked with overseeing the advance into Uganda. They steadily advanced, killing dozens of Ugandan soldiers and destroying large amounts of their material. Following the capture of Masaka and Mbarara, the TPDF halted to reorganise. Silas Mayunga was promoted to major general and given charge of a newly formed "Task Force", a unit consisting of the 206th Brigade and the Minziro Brigade, which was to operate semi-autonomously from the 20th Division. While the 20th Division moved out of southeast Uganda and attacked major locations in the country, the Task Force advanced north into western Uganda in the following months, engaging Ugandan troops conducting rearguard defensive actions.

The 20th Division captured Kampala on April 11 and overthrew Amin's government. The fall of Kampala marked the first time in the post-colonial history of the continent that an African state seized the capital of another African country. The war ended on June 3, 1979; after Tanzanian forces occupied Uganda's border region with Sudan and Zaire. Some Western military analysts attributed Tanzania's victory to the collapse of the Uganda Army, arguing that the TPDF would have been defeated by most other African armies. Others felt that the TPDF's success indicated substantial improvements in African military capabilities over the previous years.

When the TPDF began returning en masse to Tanzania, only a small number of soldiers were demobilised, contrary to public expectations. Military commanders then began making accommodations to render the wartime expansions of the army permanent, creating new units and divisional headquarters. Some in the military hierarchy expressed disapproval in light of Tanzania's bleak financial situation, and the country's depressed economy eventually forced the TPDF to disband many of the extra units. Nevertheless, the TPDF retained a large number of officers in the standing army, with the assumption that they could be used to command militiamen in the event they needed to be called back into service. The post-war size of the TPDF remained larger than the pre-war size throughout the next decade.

In 1992, the IISS listed the army with 45,000 personnel (some 20,000 conscripts), 3 division headquarters, 8 infantry brigades, one tank brigade, two field artillery battalions, two anti-aircraft artillery battalions (6 batteries), two mortar, two anti-tank battalions, one engineer regiment (battalion-sized), and one surface-to-air missile battalion with SA-3 and SA-6 missiles. Equipment included 30 Chinese Type 59 and 32 T-54/55 main battle tanks.

In 2007 Tanzania pledged forces for the SADC Standby Brigade of the African Standby Force.

== Land Force Command ==
The Land Force Command was separated from the Army and an official commander was appointed to run the operations of the Land Forces. In 2013, the other separated half of the army was officially incorporated as a new branch of the military to oversee strategic planning and administration of all the branches of the military called the Defence Force HQ Command.

As of 2012, the army is gradually modernising and restructuring. Much of the inventory is in storage or unreliable.

- 5 × infantry brigades
- 1 × armoured brigade
- 3 × artillery battalions
- 2 × air defence artillery battalions
- 1 × mortar battalion
- 2 × anti-tank battalions
- 121st Engineer Regiment (battalion size; unit identification from usaraf.army.mil and Flickr)
- 1 × central logistic/support group

== Air Force Command ==
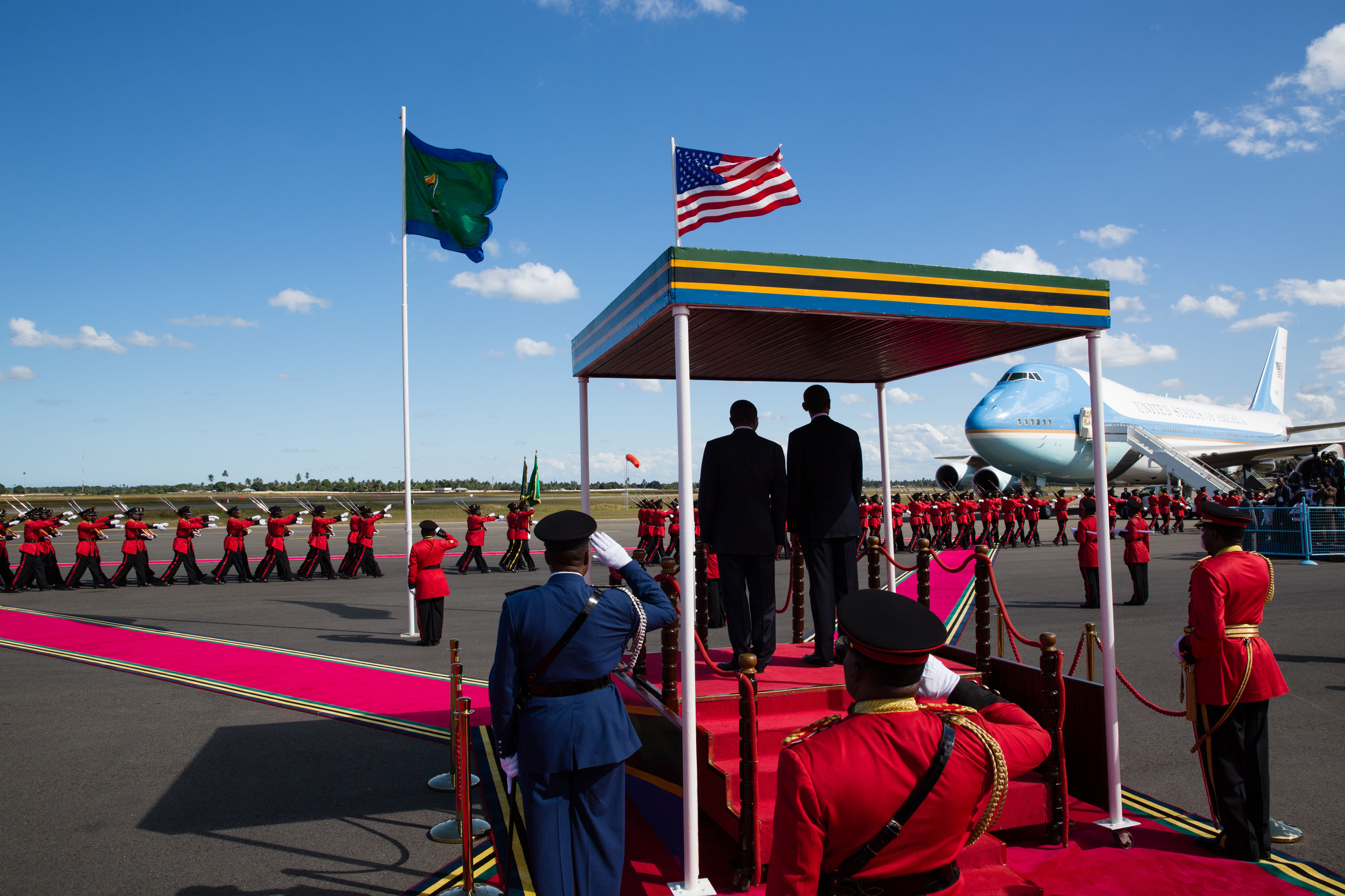
TPDF honour guard

Tanzania established its air force as the "Air Wing" (Kiswahili: Usafirishaji wa Anga) of the TPDF Air Defence Command in 1965. As it was following an international policy of non-alignment, Tanzania procured aircraft and trainers from a variety of countries, most notably China, Canada, and the Soviet Union. By 1978, the Tanzanian Air Wing possessed 14 MiG-21MFs, two MiG-21UMs, 22 Shenyang F-5s, 12 Shenyang F-6s, as well as several transport and trainer aircraft. (Note: According to Lagarde, the TPDF had 29 combat aircraft in 1979: 11 MiG-21s, 15 MiG-19s, and 3 MiG-17s. According to Paxton, it possessed 12 Chengdu F-7s (MiG-21s), 15 F-6s (MiG-19s), and 3 F-4s (MiG-17s).) Furthermore, the country's Air Defence had access to SA-3 surface-to-air missiles, SA-7 MANPADS, 14.5mm and 37mm anti-aircraft guns, and ground support equipment—including early-warning radars.

The Air Wing was eventually organised into three Kikosi cha Jeshi or KJ Brigades, with each brigade focusing on one particular element of air warfare: aircraft and helicopters (601 KJ), technical support (602 KJ), and air defence (603 KJ). The fighter aircraft unit of 601 KJ, known as "Squadron 601", was based at Mwanza Air Base (MiG-21s) and Ngerengere Air Force Base (F-5s, F-6s). In 1978 the Air Defence Command employed approximately 1,000 personnel.

The current commander of the now-Tanzania Air Force Command is Major General William Ingram, who replaced Major General Joseph Kapwani upon the latter's retirement in January 2016. During a visit to Zimbabwe in March 2014, Kapwani commended Zimbabweans for 'remaining resolute and firmly safeguarding the country's sovereignty despite the suffering brought on by illegal Western sanctions.' He made the remarks when he paid a courtesy call on Air Force of Zimbabwe Commander Air Marshal Perrance Shiri at AFZ headquarters in Harare on 12 March 2014. General Kapwani, who was then the chair of the SADC Standing Aviation Committee, said he was in Zimbabwe to share experiences and strengthen relations.

A few of the Tanzanian air wing's transport remain serviceable. However, its Shenyang F-5s, and Chengdu F-7s are reported to fly only on rare occasions because of airworthiness problems. Tanzania's long coastline means that transports are also used for patrol flights.

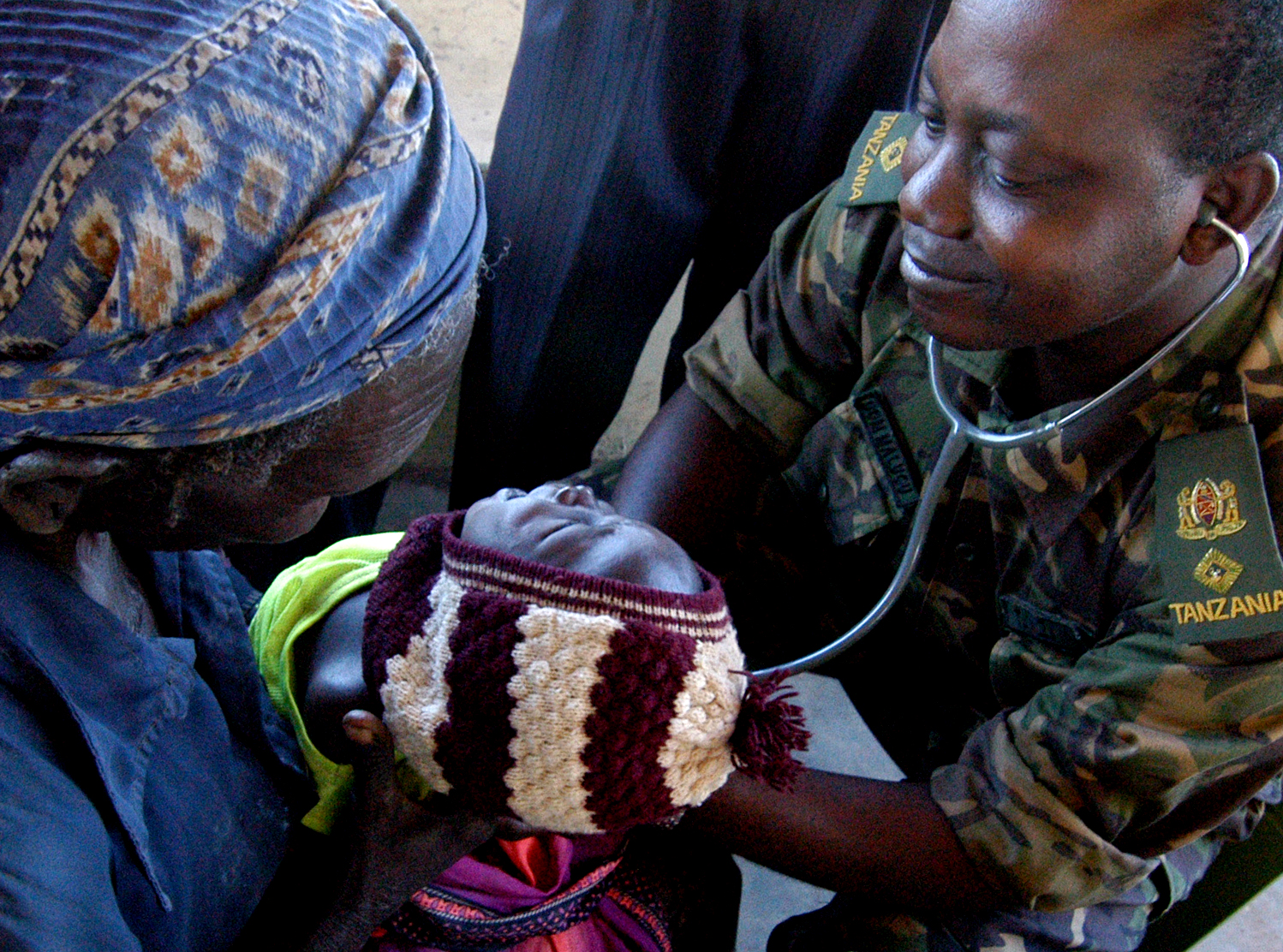
A TPDF soldier

On 14 November 2013, Helmoed-Römer Heitman reported for Jane's Defence Weekly that a 'usually reliable source' had informed Jane's that the TPDF had replaced its 12 old CAC J-7 fighters with 14 new J-7s, twelve single-seat and two dual-seat. Deliveries were completed in 2011. Heitman also reported that the aircraft were fully operational at Dar es Salaam and Mwanza air bases.

Recent estimates (2014) suggest that Tanzania's air force command operates 32 aircraft in 3 different types. It is believed they are operating 14 fighters, 11 fixed-wing attack aircraft and 7 transport aircraft. On October 1, 2015 a K-8 trainer jet of Tanzania Air Force Command crashed into the sea killing both pilots.

== Naval Command ==
The navy operates 9 fast attack craft and 12 patrol boats.

The current commander of the Naval Command is Rear Admiral Ramson Godwin Mwaisaka.

The closing ceremony of the joint Tanzanian-Chinese exercise Beyond/Transcend 2014 was held on November 14, 2014, at Kigamboni Naval Base attended by guests that included China’s ambassador to Tanzania, the Chief of the TPDF, and the heads of the navy and air force. The exercise between the Chinese People’s Liberation Army Navy and the TPDF began on October 16 in Dar es Salaam, with more than 100 navy officers and seamen participating.

Jane's Defence Weekly wrote in August 2017 that '..a People's Liberation Army Navy (PLAN) flotilla consisting of a destroyer, a frigate, and a supply vessel visited Dar es Salaam on 16–20 August.' Rear Admiral Makanzo said during the visit that Tanzania currently has two marine infantry companies, both of which were trained by the PLAN, with the training of a third company planned to begin with Chinese assistance. The admiral said that Tanzanian marines were deployed at the time in peacekeeping operations in the Central African Republic, the Democratic Republic of the Congo, and South Sudan.

== United Nations missions ==
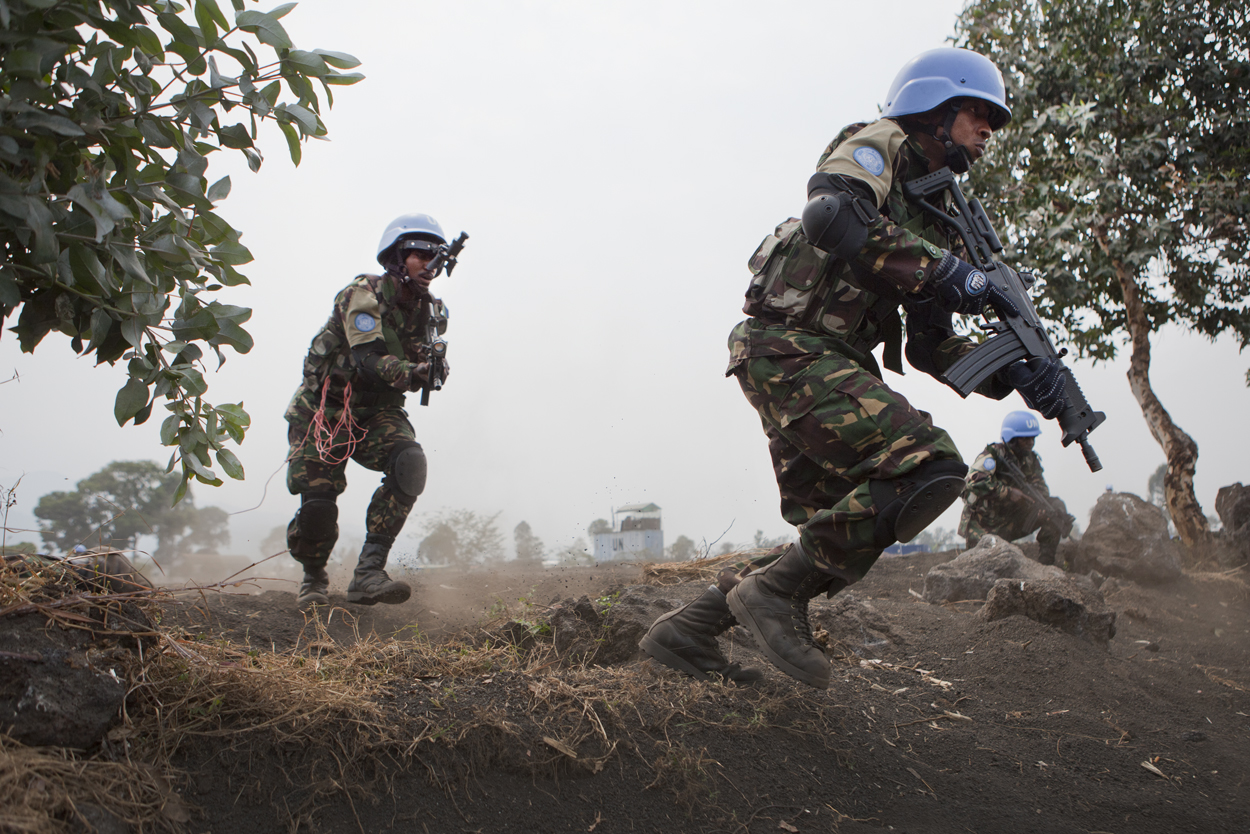
Tanzanian special forces training for the MONUSCO FIB mission

As of 30 June 2019, the TDPF is involved in the following United Nations peacekeeping missions:

Mission	Location	Number
United Nations Force Intervention Brigade (MONUSCO)	Goma, Democratic Republic of the Congo	970
United Nations African Union Mission in Darfur (UNAMID)	Darfur, Sudan	700
MINUSCA	Bangui, Central African Republic	445
United Nations Interim Force in Lebanon (UNIFIL)	Lebanon	159
United Nations Mission in South Sudan (UNMISS)	South Sudan	10
United Nations Interim Security Force for Abyei (UNISFA)	Abyei	5

== Leadership ==
Current Commanding Officers

- Chief of Defence Forces (CDF): General Jacob John Mkunda
- Chief of Staff: Lieutenant General Salum Haji Othman
- TPDF Sergeant Major: Warrant Officer Class One (WO1) Martine Peter Kaziro
- Commander of Military Headquarters: Major General Nkambi
- Commander of Land Forces: Major General Fadhil Omary Nondo
- Commander of Air Forces: Major General Shabani Baraghashi Mani
- Commander of Naval Forces: Rear Admiral Ramson Godwin Mwaisaka
- Chief of National Service: Major General Rajabu Mabele

=== Chief of Defence Force ===
No.	Portrait	Name (Birth–Death)	Term of office			Ref.
No.	Portrait	Name (Birth–Death)	Took office	Left office	Time in office	Ref.
1		General; Mirisho Sarakikya	8 January 1964	12 February 1974	10 years, 35 days	
2		General; Abdallah Twalipo	13 February 1974	8 November 1980	6 years, 269 days	
3		General; David Musuguri (1920–2024)	9 November 1980	1 September 1988	7 years, 297 days	
4		General; Ernest M. Kiaro	1 September 1988	27 January 1994	5 years, 148 days	
5		General; Robert P. Mboma	28 January 1994	30 June 2001	7 years, 153 days	
6		General; George M. Waitara	1 July 2001	13 September 2007	6 years, 74 days	
7		General; Davis Mwamunyange (born 1959)	13 September 2007	2 February 2017	9 years, 142 days	
8		General; Venance Salvatory Mabeyo (born 1956)	2 February 2017	1 July 2022	5 years, 149 days	
9		General; Jacob John Mkunda (born )	1 July 2022	Incumbent	4 years, 123 days	

== See also ==
- Rank and Insignia of the Tanzanian Armed Forces
- Tanzanian Armed Forces Uniform

== Works cited ==
- Avirgan, Tony; Honey, Martha (1983). War in Uganda: The Legacy of Idi Amin. Dar es Salaam: Tanzania Publishing House. ISBN 978-9976-1-0056-3.
- Cooper, Tom; Fontanellaz, Adrien (2015). Wars and Insurgencies of Uganda 1971–1994. Solihull: Helion & Company Limited. ISBN 978-1-910294-55-0.
- Francis, Joyce L. (1994). War as a social trap: The case of Tanzania (PhD thesis). American University. OCLC 33488070.
- Kaplan, Irving (1978). Tanzania: A Country Study, Library of Congress Country Studies (First ed.).
- Lagarde, Dominique (8 March 1979). "Ugandan-Tanzanian war examined. Amin Dada: His War in Tanzania". Translations on Sub-Saharan Africa, No. 2073. United States Joint Publications Research Service. pp. 1–9.
- Legum, Colin, ed. (1981). Africa Contemporary Record: Annual Survey and Documents: 1979–1980. Vol. XII. New York: Africana Publishing Company. ISBN 978-0-8419-0160-5.
- Lupogo, Herman (2001). "Tanzania: Civil-military Relations and Political Stability". African Security Review. 10 (1): 75–86. doi:10.1080/10246029.2001.9628102. S2CID 218648473. Archived from the original on 2013-04-17.
- Paxton, J., ed. (2016). The Statesman's Year-Book 1978-79 (reprint ed.). London: Springer. ISBN 978-0-230-27107-4.
- Thom, William G. (1988). "Judging Africa's Military Capabilities". Journal of Third World Studies. 5 (1): 52–65. JSTOR 45192991.
