= Patrick Kimumwe =

Ugandan military officer and rebel

- Photo, c. March 1978
- Born: c. 1946; Kamuli District, Uganda Protectorate
- Died: December 1978 (aged c. 32); Lake Victoria
- Relatives: Wilson "Willy" Kimumwe (brother)
- Military career
- Allegiance: Uganda Army; Save Uganda Movement (SUM)
- Service years: 1965–1978
- Rank: Major
- Unit: Malire Battalion
- Conflicts: Operation Mafuta Mingi; Uganda–Tanzania War †
- Other work: Co-author of Inside Amin's Army

Patrick Balati Kimumwe (c. 1946 – December 1978) was a Ugandan soldier, rebel, and author. He is best known for organizing a coup d'état attempt against Ugandan President Idi Amin, and subsequently escaping from the prison of Amin's notorious intelligence agency, the State Research Bureau (SRB). After his escape, Kimumwe joined the militant Ugandan opposition in Kenya where he co-authored a book on his experiences in the Uganda Army. He served as insurgent and died during the Uganda–Tanzania War. His book, Inside Amin's Army, was written to inform people about the true nature of Amin's regime.

== Biography ==
=== Early life and coup attempt ===
Patrick Kimumwe was born at Kamuli District, Uganda Protectorate, around 1946. He enlisted in the Uganda Army in 1965. His brother Wilson "Willy" Kimumwe also joined the military, eventually becoming a pilot in the Uganda Army Air Force and training to fly MiG-21 and MiG-17 jets in the Soviet Union and Iraq. The brothers became good friends of another Ugandan soldier and later author, Bernard Rwehururu. Patrick Kimumwe was eventually posted to the headquarters company of the Malire Regiment (later Malire Battalion), serving as adjutant to Captain Mustafa Adrisi.

In 1971, Ugandan President Milton Obote was deposed in a military coup. Colonel Idi Amin installed himself as new Ugandan President and ruled the country under a repressive dictatorship. Kimumwe initially rose in the ranks after Amin's takeover, and was appointed second-in-command of the Malire Battalion.

In July 1976, the Kimumwe brothers and an unidentified civilian agreed to organize a coup to overthrow Amin. Patrick Kimumwe became the leader of the conspirators who dubbed themselves the "Uganda Liberation Movement" (ULM). In the next months, their conspiracy grew to include 500 Uganda Army soldiers, mostly Christian Baganda and Basoga serving in the air force and Malire Battalion. The ULM launched their coup attempt, code-named "Operation Mafuta Mingi" on 18 June 1977, but the plan was leaked to the State Research Bureau, Uganda's intelligence agency. The operation consequently derailed, and Amin survived an attack by ULM members with light injuries. Even though some conspirators, including Wilson Kimumwe, were subsequently able to escape into exile, many ULM members were captured by the security forces. Patrick Kimumwe was arrested by the SRB. (Note: The Daily Monitor indicated that Kimumwe was captured when he personally led a team of assassins attacking Amin's convoy during the coup, contradicting other accounts of the events.)

=== Imprisonment and escape ===
Kimumwe was sent to the prison located under the SRB's headquarters at Nakasero. He was put into the facility's Cell 2 with six other ULM members, namely Lieutenant Sylvester Mutumba, Lieutenant Boswal Nambale, Officer Cadet Nicodemus Kassujja, Warrant Officer Eddie Sendaula, Warrant Officer Christopher Ssekalo, and Warrant Officer John Okech. They were regarded as the "ringleaders" of the attempted coup by the security forces. Kassujja was initially in a bad condition, as he had been shot during Operation Mafuta Mingi and his leg had been amputated. He had only been allowed a few days of rest before being dumped into the cell without painkillers. The soldiers shared the cell with other individuals who had not been involved in the coup attempt, but were suspected of other anti-Amin activities. In general, Cell 2 was windowless, overcrowded, dirty, full of rubbish, and infested by rats.

Even though their role in Operation Mafuta Mingi was proven beyond doubt, Kimumwe and his six co-conspirators were not immediatedly tied and executed. President Amin wanted them to publicly confess their guilt before killing them, and thus opted to first execute other dissidents. However, they were subjected to repeated torture, and forced to constantly wear handcuffs. However, Kassujja was able to find a small piece of metal among the cell's rubbish, and fashioned it into a lockpick. As a result, the group was able to get off their handcuffs whenever the prison guards were not present. On 9 September 1977, twelve other prisoners were taken from Cell 2, and publicly shot for their alleged support of Operation Mafuta Mingi. At this point, only the seven ULM members and Wycliff Kato, the former director of civil aviation in Uganda, were left at Cell 2. (Note: Wycliff Kato had not taken part in the coup attempt. His imprisonment was connected to his refusal to sign pilot certificates for relatively untrained Egyptian pilots who were supposed to replace American pilots for Ugandan civil aircraft. His repeated refusals had upset the Ugandan government. Eventually, Kato had been forced to sign the certificates by Minister Moses Ali, and then sent to the SRB prison.) The prison guards informed the remaining prisoners at Cell 2 that they would soon be used for "live target practice".

Knowing that their executions were not far off, the Cell 2 inmates started to think about an escape plan. Ideas about seizing keys from the guards or creating their own keys from scrap were deemed too dangerous and difficult. However, Sendaula noticed that they could possibly flee through the cell's ventilation system. The ventilators were protected by metal bars, and contained hard wire gauze as well as slanting pieces of glass. The group began to work on one ventilator, using the scrap in their cell to create tools with which they could silently cut the wire gauze and remove the glass, succeeding in this by 11 September. Afterwards, they had to bend the bars. To do so, they fashioned crowbars and a hacksaw from the rubbish. In this, the group was mainly led and organized by Ssekalo.

One day, Kimumwe, Mutumba, Kassujja, Ssekalo were temporarily removed from their cell and brought to Major Faruk Minawa, the SRB's operations officer. He ordered them to write and sign their confessions; in doing so, the group also included their motives for plotting Operation Mafuta Mingi. Kimumwe and Mutumba later commented that "like it or not, we had signed our own death warrants", as the motives were quite critical of Amin's rule. On 20 September, the four were again removed from their cell and transported to one of President Amin's residences, where Faruk informed them that their behavior might decide whether they would be spared or executed. The meeting with the President was accompanied and documented by a reporter of the Voice of Uganda. Amin accused the four conspirators of ungratefulness, pointing out that he had personally promoted them and provided them with various rewards. Kimumwe stayed silent, but Kassujja exclaimed that the President would have died if not for a traitor in the ULM's ranks. Amin threatened that they would face a military tribunal soon, and if found guilty, blown up by the same bazookas which the dissidents had imported for the coup attempt. Even though the President claimed that they would be spared if they pleaded for mercy, the four knew that almost all military tribunals chaired by Juma Butabika ended in death sentences.

Once brought back to the prison, the group thus decided to continue with their escape plan. They made their first attempt to get past the metal bars in the night of 20 September, but the opening was still too small for the two largest inmates, Ssekalo and Okech. The group thus continued to work at the bars for two more days. Even though they succeeded in enlargening the opening so that Ssekalo could get through, it remained too small for Okech. At 2am on 23 September 1977, the group tried a final time to push him through, but in vain. After some discussion, Okech agreed to remain behind, despite knowing that he would most probably die. His ultimate fate remains unclear, but he was never seen again. Kimumwe and the other six prisoners managed to get into the open, and began to carefully crawl around, hoping to find some way to leave the SRB compound. Their way was blocked by barbed fences and security dogs. However, the group was aided by the fact that the guards were not very attentive, and they eventually managed to sneak across the compound and through a lightly guarded gate onto a nearby road. The group then split up and initially went into hiding in Kampala, finding refuge with sympathizers. After spreading false rumours about already having fled into exile, Kimumwe and his comrades gradually made their way to Kenya in secret. (Note: The escape was surrounded by various false rumours, including of Israeli involvement or a wider conspiracy within the Uganda Army. Journalists Tony Avirgan and Martha Honey also fell for these stories, claiming that the escapees had made their way to Tel Aviv.) Following their escape, the SRB launched new purges and ordered the arrest as well as murder of several people who were suspected of connections to Operation Mafuta Mingi.

=== Exile activities and death ===
In exile, Kimumwe and Mutumba wrote a book titled Inside Amin's Army about their experiences. Kimumwe told the Drum magazine that the two hoped to inform people about the true nature of Amin's regime, arguing that "his clowning conceals a ruthless extinction of human rights" in Uganda.

Kimumwe became part of the militant anti-Amin opposition in Kenya, and eventually met Yoweri Museveni who invited him to join the Front for National Salvation. In October 1978, the Uganda–Tanzania War broke out, and Kimumwe joined the Save Uganda Movement to fight for the anti-Amin rebels. In the following December, he was part of an insurgent force that tried to cross Lake Victoria to infiltrate Entebbe. However, their boat sank, and Kimumwe drowned.
