= Ugandan coup d'état =

Ugandan coup d'état may refer to:

- 1985 Ugandan coup d'état
- 1977 Ugandan coup d'état attempt
- 1974 Uganda coup d'état attempt
- 1971 Ugandan coup d'état
- 1966 Ugandan coup d'état
