= 1977 Ugandan coup attempt =

1977 Ugandan coup d'état attempt may refer to:

- Operation Mafuta Mingi in June 1977
- 1977 invasion of Uganda in October 1977
