= Arube uprising =

1974 Ugandan coup d'état attempt against Idi Amin

Date	23–24 March 1974
Location	Kampala; minor spillovers into other parts of Uganda
Result	Government victory: Purge in the Uganda Army; Several concessions are made to coup sympathizers, including the appointment of Mustafa Adrisi as army chief of staff

Belligerents
Ugandan government	Putschists

Commanders and leaders
Idi Amin; Taban Lupayi	Charles Arube †; Elly Aseni (POW)

Units involved
Presidential Guard; Marine Regiment; Military Police; Public Safety Unit	Malire Battalion mutineers

Strength
Several units	Much of Kampala's garrison

Casualties and losses
- At least 100 soldiers killed

The Arube uprising, also known as Arube mutiny and Arube Coup, was a military coup d'état attempt organized on 23–24 March 1974 by discontented elements of the Uganda Army to overthrow Ugandan President Idi Amin. Led by Brigadier Charles Arube, the coupists aimed not only for a government takeover, but also to remove many influential foreign-born soldiers from the Ugandan military. Although the rebels initially succeeded in capturing much of Uganda's capital Kampala, Arube was killed by Amin as he attempted to capture him, resulting in the gradual collapse of the coup. With the aid of loyal troops from outside the capital, the President was able to put down the coup after two days of heavy fighting.

After the coup, the Ugandan government claimed that Arube had committed suicide, and initiated a limited purge of suspected dissidents in the army. Most coup supporters and sympathizers were treated leniently, however, as their cause was popular in the military. Amin consequently made several concessions, including releasing surviving coup leaders, appointing Mustafa Adrisi as the new army chief, and reorganizing the unpopular Military Police to avoid another uprising. Nevertheless, unrest continued in the Uganda Army during the remainder of his rule, and he faced several more coup attempts as well as mutinies until his overthrow in 1979.

== Background ==
Colonel Idi Amin seized power in Uganda during the 1971 coup d'état, overthrowing President Milton Obote who had previously planned to arrest Amin. The takeover was achieved with the support of a small coterie of low ranking Uganda Army officers—most of whom were of Nubian or West Nile origin—who felt their positions would have been threatened by Amin's arrest. Several higher-ranking officers also did not oppose his takeover. Over time, Amin began to promote several poorly educated and recently recruited soldiers, causing growing tensions with officers who had previously supported or tolerated his regime.

As discontent grew, several attempts were made by officers of West Nile origin to overthrow the President. Ethnic tensions in the military worsened, as various factions representing the interests of different West Nile tribal groups conspired to gain power. One of the most numerous ethnic groups within the Uganda Army, the Lugbara, became increasingly dissatisfied with Amin's government as the President attempted to disempower them. The Ugandan President suspected Christian Lugbara officers of plotting a coup. To maintain control over the military, Amin recruited many foreign-born soldiers into the army, regarding them as more loyal to his own regime. However, native Ugandan officers and soldiers felt increasingly marginalized by the growing number of foreigners, resulting in more unrest. Amin also began to favor Muslims, prompting opposition from Christian troops. As resistance to Amin increased, loyalist elements in the Uganda Army became more energetic in advocating and organizing violence against suspected dissidents within the military. The Military Police under Hussein Marella took a leading role in terrorizing other soldiers, and consequently became very unpopular. Many troops viewed Marella as representative of the brutal, recently promoted foreigners who were leading Amin astray. This image was only partially correct: Marella was indeed of Sudanese origin, had been promoted after the 1971 coup, and was one of the most important advocates of violent suppression of anti-government elements. However, he was also a long-time army veteran who had lived in Uganda since 1954, and his actions were generally supported or tolerated by Amin.

As time went on, Amin dispersed several high-ranking Lugbara, removing them from key positions in the government and military. The Lugbara resistance to Amin grew in the army due to the murder of Lieutenant Colonel Michael Ondoga. Ondoga, an ethnic Lugbara, had served as foreign minister until being removed from his position in February 1974. He was then kidnapped and killed by the State Research Bureau (SRB), causing outrage among the Lugbara soldiers despite Amin's attempts to implicate outside powers in the murder. Several other Lugbara officers were also arrested and sentenced to death. On 21 March 1974, Amin also replaced the Lugbara commander of the Malire Battalion with Lieutenant Colonel Juma Butabika. According to journalist Felix Ocen, "it is thought" that the Ugandan President's actions against the Lugbara officers was a deliberate move to provoke his opponents into open resistance so that he had "ample ground to crush them".

== Prelude ==
While unrest in the Uganda Army as a whole was high, tensions also grew among its high-ranking officers. Two Christian Kakwa, namely Brigadier Charles Arube and Lieutenant Colonel Elly Aseni, proved to be particularly upset at the growing power of the military's foreign soldiers. In contrast to several of the officers recently promoted by the President, both were career soldiers. Arube had served as Uganda Army chief of staff, while Aseni was Governor of North Buganda Province and also a relative of the President. Arube was regarded as one of the more moderate officers in the army in regards to treating suspected dissidents; this contributed to him gradually falling out of favor with the government. In 1973, Arube was sent to the Soviet Union for a training mission. The United States Central Intelligence Agency suspected that this was a deliberate move by Amin to remove Arube from the country, as the President had become wary of the latter's influence. When he returned to Uganda in March 1974, Arube found that his temporary replacement as chief of staff, Hussein Marella, refused to vacate his new position. The anger felt towards Marella, the Military Police, and foreign troops in general caused many soldiers to sympathize with Arube. Arube already had good relations with the Lugbara troops. In contrast to Arube's grievances, Aseni's opposition to Marella was more personal. According to another officer, Isaac Bakka, the two had developed a rivalry which culminated in an assassination attempt on Aseni, killing the latter's family. Aseni consequently vowed to take revenge on Marella.

Faced with Marella's obstruction, Arube asked Amin to intervene, but the President put off the issue. Frustrated, Arube called a meeting at the Officer's Mess at Nakasero, Kampala. Several officers attended, including Aseni, Butabika, Major Moses Galla (Mountains of the Moon Battalion commander), Major Amin Lomo (Air and Sea Battalion commander), Captain Steven Galla (Kilembe Mines general manager), Lieutenant Enoc Maturima (Malire tank commander), and Lieutenant Michael Akonyu (paratroopers school commander).

At the meeting, Arube voiced his grievances, and asked the other officers for advice. Aseni reportedly advised him to talk to Amin again, Butabika offered to talk to the President on his behalf, while Galla argued that another high-ranking officer, namely Brig. Smuts Guweddeko, possibly could convince Marella to vacate his position. Arube thanked them, and decided to tell them his decision at a second meeting. Instead, Arube and Aseni allied themselves with the discontented Lugbara troops garrisoned in Kampala, and began to plan a coup to depose Amin and purge the Uganda Army of foreigners. To maintain secrecy, Arube and Aseni decided to only inform others of their plans on the day of their supposed coup. They were sure that several other, lower-ranking officers would support them: These included Captain John Maturima, Isaac Bakka (Note: Bakka was described as Second Lieutenant or Captain at the time.) (son of then-Minister of Education Barnabas Kili), Second Lieutenant Moses Mawa, Captain John Simba, Captain Birimbo, Lieutenant Mazamir, and Sergeant Anguyo. The coup plotters assumed that most of the troops in Kampala would side with them when the coup started. Accordingly, they planned to mobilize the city's garrisons to seal off Kampala, preventing loyalist reinforcements from entering the city, while occupying important locations such as Radio Uganda and Uganda Television.

Two strike teams were supposed to eliminate Amin as well as Marella: One was supposed to be commanded by Maturima, and attack the command post at Kololo Hill to take Amin dead or alive. The other was led by Mawa and targeted the Makindye Military Barracks, the Military Police's base, where Marella was presumed to stay. The putschists also intended to arrest or kill Ali Towelli who headed the Public Safety Unit (PSU), Isaac Maliyamungu, staff officer in charge of training and all operations, and Taban Lupayi, Marine Regiment commander. The plotters agreed that Arube and Aseni should initially stay hidden until Radio Uganda was secured, whereupon Arube would make a radio broadcast and announce a leadership change to the public. In addition, certain officers were supposed to visit army units outside the capital, convincing them to purge the foreigners in their ranks and join the coup. The coup plotters had supporters in Jinja, Mbale, and Arua. The operation was scheduled to start at 9am on 23 March 1974. At the time, several other high-ranking commanders, including General Mustafa Adrisi, were absent from the capital.

On the morning of 23 March, Arube and Aseni personally contacted those they considered trustworthy, including Bakka, and convinced them to join the operation. In the case of Bakka, they claimed that they were acting to remove the foreigners from the military and depose the government, as it had murdered several native military and political figures.

== Coup d'état attempt ==
Map of Kampala showing important locations during the coup

The coup began as planned on 23 March 1974, as the Lugbara troops initiated an uprising at the Malire Barracks in Kampala. (Note: In the coup's immediate aftermath, there was much confusion among international media as to what had happened on 23–24 March 1974, with some arguing that it was a coup attempt and others considering a violent purge that escalated into a mutiny more likely. The New York Times initially reported that Arube had been "disappeared" on Amin's orders, causing the Lugbara soldiers to mutiny to free him.) According to Ocen, the Lugbara troops were provoked into action after hearing rumours about Arube having been kidnapped by security forces. The coup plotters rallied the troops to their cause by portraying their uprising as attack on "foreign elements" in the Uganda Army. The operation initially went as planned, as the putschists seized much of Kampala, although many foreign soldiers managed to flee the city. Mawa and his troops blocked the Entebbe Road, and captured Nateete, Katwe, and the surroundings of the Makindye Barracks. However, Marella had been informed of the uprising early enough to flee Kampala, moving to the village of Kitubulu near Entebbe. (Note: According to Ocen, the attack on the Makindye Barracks was organized around midnight of 24 March, and aimed at freeing Arube who was suspected of being imprisoned there.) Mawa's men still sealed off the Makindye Barracks, and eventually stormed it. Captain Simba blocked the Busega junction, and Captain Birimbo secured the Bank of Uganda, the Post Office and their surroundings. The soldiers led by Lieutenant Mazamir and Sergeant Anguyo captured Radio Uganda and Uganda Television, followed by the neighborhoods of Wandegeya, Mulago and Nakasero. In addition, Mazamir and Anguyo blocked the Jinja Road to prevent the loyalist Marine Regiment, stationed in Bugolobi, from supporting Amin at Kololo. The rebels also attacked the PSU headquarters in Naguru. In the south of Uganda, some troops blocked the Kabale-Masaka road to prevent the movement of Rwandan Tutsi SRB agents.

After failing to capture Marella, Arube called Lieutenant Colonel Abdul Kisule, commander of the Artillery Regiment at Masindi, falsely believing that the Military Police leader had fled north. Arube tried to convince Kisule to arrest Marella on sight, arguing that many people had been forcibly disappeared by Marella and his companions, while also threatening an attack by the Malire Battalion if the Artillery Regiment failed to act upon his appeals. Kisule refused to do anything without the President's orders, and ordered his troops to take defensive positions. No attack on Masindi by the putschists materialised. (Note: Kisule stated that Arube called him "at around 1am in the morning of the coup", although the coup began on 8am or 9am on 23 March.) Instead, coup member Bakka arrived at Masindi to convince Kisule to arrest the foreigners. The Artillery Regiment commander still refused, arguing that Arube's coup was a "uprising against Muslim leadership" which would once again marginalize Muslims as they were under previous Ugandan governments. Bakka consequently left for Bondo near Arua. The local commander, Lieutenant Colonel Gabriel, promptly arrested Bakka.

Amin was a brave soldier, let us recognise that. Despite being besieged, he was still struggling to arrest the situation. He did not attempt to flee. He wanted if he was to be captured, it must be after a bloody battle.

— Isaac Bakka

Meanwhile, Arube changed his plans. Captain Maturima was travelling toward the Kololo Hill with a strong force of about 60 soldiers and several armoured personnel carriers (APCs) when Arube called him, ordering him to wait as he himself would come and take charge of the assault on Amin's command post. After a few minutes Arube arrived, and the attack proceeded. As Arube was not at Radio Uganda to make an announcement, the radio broadcast "Anglican hymns, popular music and other bland material" such as Onward, Christian Soldiers during most of the coup. One of the coup plotters, Isaac Bakka, later claimed that Arube had reasoned that Amin should be captured by a senior officer due to military traditions. When the putschists arrived at the command post, they surrounded it while encountering heavy resistance by the Presidential Guards. Amin had opted not to flee, and was determined to fight off the attackers long enough to allow loyalist reinforcements to relieve him. He called the Marine Regiment for assistance.

The Presidential Guards were among the best trained and armed troops of the Uganda Army and, although only 30 guarded the command post, they fought off the attacking putschists for several minutes. According to Bakka, all of the Presidential Guards were killed in the battle. After these defenders had been overwhelmed, the putschists hesitated to enter the command post for about 10 minutes. Then, Arube reportedly got impatient and angry, and decided to capture Amin by himself. He ordered the others to wait, while he slowly entered the house through the front door, believing that the President was hiding in one of the rooms. Instead, Amin had taken position just behind the door. After entering the building, Arube was promptly shot dead by Amin. (Note: According to A.B.K. Kasozi, Arube was shot in the stomach. Amii Omara-Otunnu claimed that Arube was "murdered by Amin's soldiers".) The soldiers on the outside heard the shots, but could not see who had been killed. They heard someone shout "I have killed one, come quickly to my rescue", but unsure about who had died, they stayed put. After a few minutes, the loyalist Marine Regiment under Taban Lupayi arrived at the command post. Already demoralized and heavily outnumbered, the remaining putschists there surrendered. According to some tellings of the events, Amin personally addressed the mutineers in front of the command post, convincing them to lay down weapons by promising concessions and promotions.

Although Arube's death effectively ended the coup's chance of success, many of the revolting soldiers remained unwilling to give up or were not yet informed of the uprising's failure. In the north, Bakka was released from custody, allegedly on Mustafa Adrisi's orders. He subsequently continued his tour, visiting Gulu, Lira, Mbale, Jinja before returning to Kampala. After the Radio Uganda was retaken by loyalists around afternoon on 23 March, Amin ordered messages to be broadcast by the Minister of Information and Broadcasting, Colonel Juma Oris. At 3pm, the radio announced that the President had met with members of the Malire Battalion, the Military Police, and paratroopers, while blaming "confusion" for the fighting. In contrast, U.S. diplomats stated that Amin was not seen in public during the uprising. Two hours later, it was declared that Arube had shot himself, although there were no statements directly addressing the coup attempt. Radio Uganda declared that "the situation [was] under control". Hearing these announcements upon returning to Kampala, Bakka attempted to contact Arube and Aseni by radio, but no one answered his calls.

Heavy fighting continued during the next night and for much of 24 March. (Note: Ocen stated that the uprising was put down by 6am.) One officer supportive of Arube, Lieutenant James Ayoma of the Kifaru Regiment, was stationed in the north. On the coup's second day, he ordered six soldiers of the Bondo Battalion to kill three pro-Marella soldiers in Arua; they succeeded in murdering two. Several loyalist units, including tanks and APCs, eventually moved into Kampala. At least one hundred soldiers were killed during the fighting. According to researcher Paul Nugent, Nubian soldiers proved crucial in defeating the revolting troops. Later radio announcements confirmed that Arube had attempted a coup, alleging that Arube had been "confusing" the Malire Battalion by spreading stories about a foreign invasion to manipulate them into rebelling. According to Bakka, one radio message was relayed by a captured putschist, Sergeant Toburo. It stated that Arube had committed suicide upon realizing that he could not defeat the President. Many soldiers who had not taken part in the coup were angry upon hearing of Arube's death, not necessarily out of sympathy for him but due to frustration about "the general situation". Orders were also broadcast to kill the known coup leaders, namely Aseni, Mawa, Maturima, and Bakka.

At some point on 24 March, Amin summoned soldiers for a public address at his headquarters. After learning that Marella was supposed to appear during the President's speech, several troopers got so furious that they planned "to burn down Republic House" at Kololo Hill. However, Amin eventually decided to appear alone; he initially calmed down the angry soldiers by appearing jolly and charming. Then he suddenly got furious, accusing the soldiers of mistreating civilians. The troops were initially intimidated, but one warrant officer spoke up, claiming that members of Amin's inner circle were forcibly disappearing people. Most of the audience clapped; the President asked what the troops wanted. They demanded an end of the kidnappings and "Ali Toweli and Marella out of Kampala". Meanwhile, Aseni fled to Zaire (present-day Democratic Republic of the Congo), but returned to Uganda in June; he was promptly arrested. Several other putschists were eventually captured.

== Aftermath ==
According to Ugandan Minister of Health Henry Kyemba, Amin visited Arube's corpse in the Mulago Hospital mortuary after the coup had been defeated. He spent about three minutes alone with the corpse; Kyemba alleged that he might have cannibalized Arube's blood. Amin also ordered a selective purge of Kakwa army officers and Lugbara troops, most of them Christian, killing about 500. These troops were allegedly executed by "firing squad, shot in the knee caps and left to bleed, thrown alive to Nile crocodiles, drenched in petrol and burned". Punitive operations targeted the West Nile region, causing many civilians to flee to Sudan. However, most of the surviving supporters of the coup were treated leniently, as their cause was relatively popular among the military. The President organized a commission of inquiry which put most of the blame for the events on the government. A subsequent military tribunal of the coup plotters also did not proceed according to Amin's wishes. Elly Aseni was not prosecuted, and then released, as many Uganda Army members voiced their sympathy for him. Amin accepted this outcome, as he had been informed that other soldiers would attempt a coup if Aseni was convicted. Aseni subsequently retired with pay in Arua, and was later appointed ambassador to the Soviet Union. Bakka was also pardoned, and continued to serve in the army until 1979. In addition, Amin was forced to placate the troops by giving in to several initial demands of the coup plotters, including dismissing Marella and appointing Mustafa Adrisi as new chief of staff. Toweli was also sent away from Kampala. New personnel were appointed to lead the unpopular Military Police, including Lieutenant Colonel Albert Drajua as new commander, and orders were given to curtail its violent excesses. Marella retired in Yei in southern Sudan.

Amin took precautions to prevent a repeat of the coup. Mutineers and suspected coup sympathizers were transferred to posts outside the capital. The entire Malire Battalion was moved to the town of Bombo. The President also divorced his wife Kay, an ethnic Lugbara, as she was suspected of having acted as an informer for the coup plotters. She was murdered five months later.

Despite the failure of Arube's coup, resistance to Amin within the military continued. In May 1974, groups of anti-Amin soldiers clashed with each other in Entebbe after failing to coordinate a unified opposition to the government. After the purge of the Lugbara commander of the Suicide Battalion, another uprising broke out in November 1974. Lugbara troops mutinied at the Mbuya barracks, and revolting Suicide Battalion troops had to be defeated at Mbarara. At least 15 soldiers were killed, and several others deserted. Thereafter, the Lugbara were no longer powerful enough to act as "counterweight to the Amin regime". From 1975, the "Kakwa-Nubi-Anyanya core" was dominant in the military. Despite their loss of power, most members of other West Nile tribes remained at least nominally loyal, as they still benefited from Amin's regime.

The Uganda Army continued to suffer from unrest and infighting, including several more coup attempts. In 1977, members of the Malire Battalion were involved in another coup attempt, code-named Operation Mafuta Mingi. Amin was finally overthrown during the Uganda–Tanzania War in April 1979. In January 2013, Uganda's new national military, the Uganda People's Defence Force, declared its intention to honor Arube's attempt to overthrow Amin. To this end, the military decided to exhume Arube who had been buried in Jinja in 1974, and rebury him with full military honors in his hometown of Koboko. Arube was reburied in February 2013. Several local leaders in Koboko used the opportunity to implore President Yoweri Museveni to "forgive" Idi Amin's mistakes. Museveni responded by saying "I cannot blame West Nile because of mistakes made by Idi Amin. [...] If somebody makes a mistake, he makes it as an individual. [...] But I thank Arube for dying like a soldier and a hero for opposing what Amin was doing."
