= Faruk Malik =

Pakistani spy in Ugandan service

- Born: Zanzibar
- Occupation: State Research Bureau agent
- Known for: Leading spy of Ugandan President Idi Amin
- Spouse: Saeeda

Faruk Malik (Note: His name was also spelled "Farook".) was a Ugandan intelligence officer who served during the dictatorship of President Idi Amin in the 1970s. Working in the State Research Bureau, Malik reportedly oversaw dozens of spies, advised Amin on important matters, acquired foreign aid, and spied on Uganda's Asian community.

== Biography ==
According to journalists Martha Honey and David B. Ottaway, Malik was a "Zanzibari of Pakistani origin". Indian diplomat Madanjeet Singh concurred, describing him as Pakistani national. In contrast, one of Amin's advisors, Bob Astles, claimed that Malik was a "Pakistani/British Asian" and "London friend" of his.

Malik rose to prominence while serving in the State Research Bureau, a Ugandan intelligence agency and secret police which operated during President Amin's rule (1971–1979). According to Singh, Malik was Amin's "master spy". Astles stated that Malik understood the President very well, and that the two were "very close". In this position, he played a major role in Uganda's Ministry of Information, overseeing "several dozen" other spies. One of his main tasks was to spy on Uganda's expatriate and local Asian community. He also assessed and organized British newspaper clippings on Uganda. According to Astles, Malik was supposed to keep Amin up-to-date on "hijacking developments" after the President gave shelter to a hijacked Airbus A300 jet airliner in 1976.

In addition, Malik helped the Ugandan government in procuring foreign technology and experts. He signed a contract with the Harris Corporation to set up a satellite station in Arua; he personally profited from this deal. Honey and Ottaway also claimed that Malik "singlehandedly" recruited about 400 Pakistani experts to support Amin's regime, although Singh stated that Finance Minister Moses Ali played a crucial role in bringing Pakistani personnel to Uganda. Overall, hundreds of Pakistanis were aiding the Ugandan government by 1978, providing crucial technical support in a military and civilian capacity.

When the Uganda–Tanzania War erupted in 1978, Malik and his associate Justice Mohamed Said attempted to bolster Amin's government. He was among the last loyalists of the Ugandan government, although both he and Said fled the country before the Fall of Kampala to Tanzanian-led troops in April 1979. The two Pakistanis managed to cross the border to Kenya, although their Mercedes-Benz cars were confiscated by Amin's guards for their own escape.
