= Operation Mafuta Mingi =

Ugandan coup d'état attempt

Date	18 June 1977
Location	Uganda
Result	Ugandan government victory

Belligerents
Uganda	Uganda Liberation Movement (Note: Not to be confused with other anti-Amin groups of the same name, such as the umbrella organization founded in 1973 or the Kenya-based rebel group that attempted to invade Uganda in October 1977.)

Commanders and leaders
Idi Amin (WIA)	Patrick Kimumwe (POW); Wilson Kimumwe; Anthony Bazalaki; Sylvester Mutumba (POW)

Units involved
Uganda Army loyalists State Research Bureau	Uganda Army dissidents: Malire Battalion elements; UAAF elements

Strength
Unknown	c. 500

Operation Mafuta Mingi (Kiswahili for: "much cooking oil"; alternatively spelled "Mafutamingi") was a coup d'état attempt on 18 June 1977 which aimed at killing Ugandan President Idi Amin and overthrowing his government. The operation was organized by the "Uganda Liberation Movement", a group consisting of dissident Uganda Army soldiers and pilots, backed by business owners in Kampala and Entebbe.

The coup plotters were able to amass a substantial force, and planned to eliminate Amin by first bombing his position using combat aircraft, followed by a ground-based attack. On the day of the coup, however, the President was warned and was able to prevent the aerial attack. He then escaped from Entebbe to Kampala, throwing the coup plotters off guard and breaking through a group of dissidents who tried to stop his convoy. Afterwards, the operation unravelled, as coup members were arrested or fled to Kenya. Amin stayed in power until 1979 when he was deposed as a result of the Uganda–Tanzania War.

== Background ==
In 1971, a military coup overthrew the President of Uganda, Milton Obote. Colonel Idi Amin installed himself as new Ugandan President and ruled the country under a repressive dictatorship. After the coup, Amin launched purges of his enemies, and empowered his own followers to consolidate his regime. The country's military, officially known as Uganda Army (UA), was most affected by this development. Much of its leadership was killed or expelled, while members of ethnic and religious groups supportive of Amin were recruited and promoted en masse. He also set up a new intelligence agency, the State Research Bureau (SRB) which operated a large network of informants.

In the next years, Amin's regime became increasingly unpopular. He and his important supporters were nicknamed Mafuta Mingi after cooking oil, a rare but highly important commodity in Uganda at the time. The term was meant to convey that the President's inner circle grew wealthy, while the rest of Uganda suffered from economic chaos. Amin faced repeated coup attempts by members of his own security forces as well as exiled opposition members. From 1976 to 1977 alone, the SRB estimated that there were eleven coup attempts. Amin's security forces reacted to threats to his rule with extreme brutality. His opponents estimated that up to 300,000 Ugandans were killed during Amin's rule.

== Prelude ==
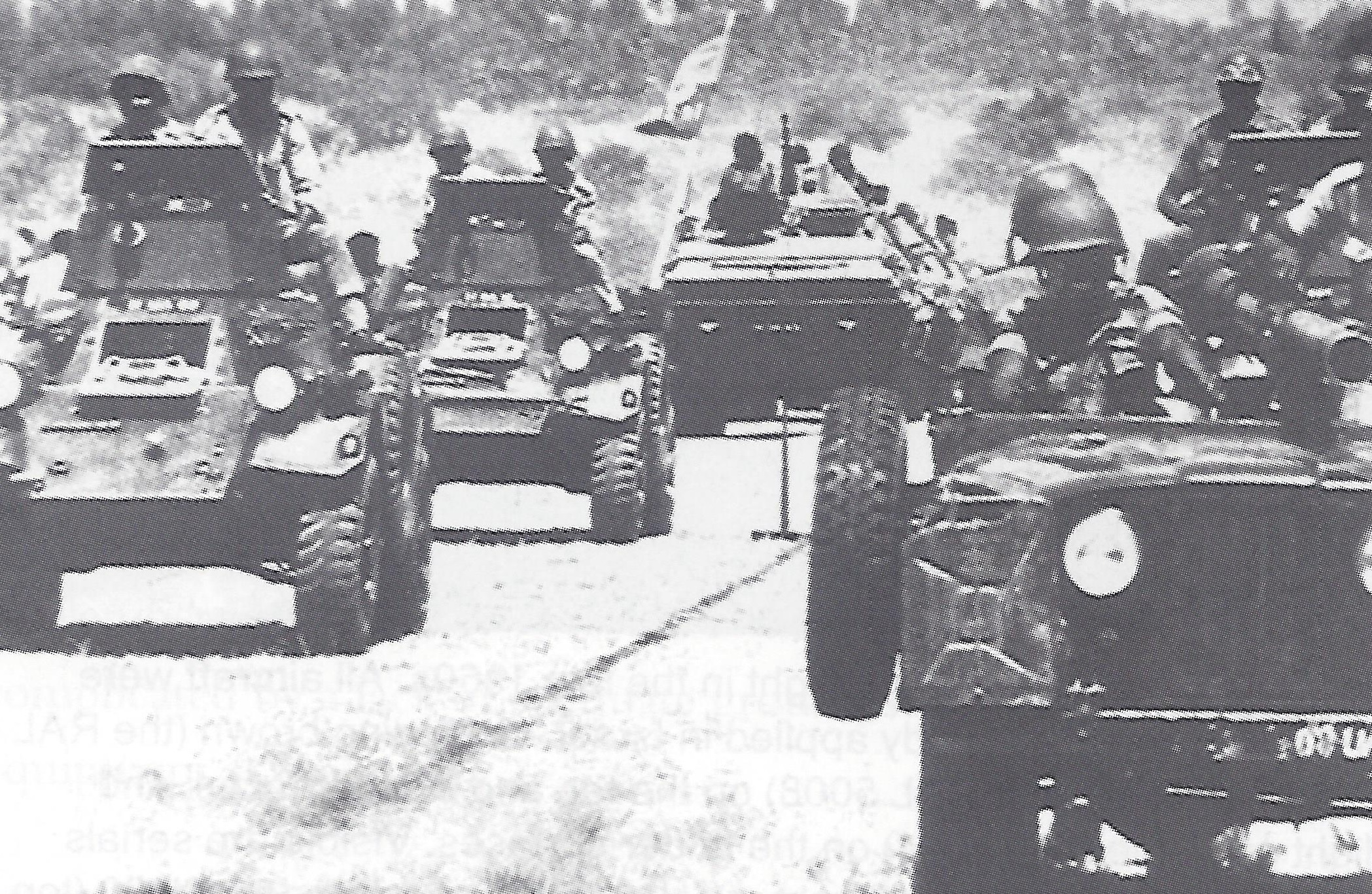
Operation Mafuta Mingi was organized by Uganda Army soldiers (UA troops pictured in the late 1960s)

Operation Mafuta Mingi was headed by Major Patrick Kimumwe who served as the Malire Battalion's second-in-command at the time. The remaining coup leaders were mostly Uganda Army Air Force (UAAF) officers, including Patrick's brother Captain Wilson "Willy" Kimumwe, (Note: In the coup's aftermath, The Washington Post confused the two brothers, reporting that a UAAF major and his brother, an army captain, had led Operation Mafuta Mingi.) Major Anthony Bazalaki, and Lieutenant Sylvester Mutumba. The latter served as the second-in-command of the squadron of fighter jet trainers. Wilson Kimumwe later claimed that he, his brother, and a prominent civilian had started the plot in July 1976. The three agreed to overthrow Amin, and the civilian was designated as the next President. The conspirators later formed a committee of 11 soldiers and civilians. The coup plotters were reportedly "sickened by the indiscriminate slaughter" during Amin's rule, and wanted to ultimately restore the parliamentary democracy in Uganda. The group was able to enlist more members after the murder of the popular Archbishop Janani Luwum by Amin's security forces in February 1977.

The coup plotters dubbed their group the "Uganda Liberation Movement" (ULM); it eventually grew to include about 500 soldiers. Most conspirators were Christian Baganda as well as Basoga. Even though the coup plotters were concentrated in the Malire Battalion and the UAAF personnel stationed at the Gulu Airbase, they infiltrated a dozen units of the military overall. Whereas the Malire Battalion had already supported a previous coup attempt, namely the Arube uprising, the air force was considered loyal, as the President "lavishly pampered" it. The conspirators used the name of Saint Kizito as a code word to identify each other. An engineer working at Kampala's telephone exchange ensured that they could safely communicate with each other, and an informer in the SRB kept them up-to-date on Amin's plans. Ugandan exiles living in Kenya, Tanzania, and Zambia were also included in the planning; among these were possibly ex-diplomat Paulo Muwanga and exiled businessman Martin Aliker. (Note: Aliker had also financed an unsuccessful assassination attempt on Amin, termed "Operation Luzira", in early 1977.) The ULM received substantial backing from business owners in Kampala and Entebbe who allowed the coup plotters to store weaponry at their shops in preparation of the coup. Most of these supporters were "small businessmen", although one "prominent businesswoman" in Kampala was also involved. The ULM slowly amassed its weaponry by stealing guns from the Uganda Army and smuggling them in from abroad; they eventually collected about 800 modern guns. In addition, several Ugandan diplomats reportedly knew of the plans and supported them, assuring the ULM that their new government would be quickly recognized by other states.

The coup plotters initially intended to launch their operation on 16 or 17 June, but Amin unexpectedly changed his plans on both days, foiling the conspirators' plans. The ULM leaders met a final time on 17 June, and decided to launch an "all-or-nothing attack" on the next day. Amin was supposed to meet with his cabinet at Entebbe's State House. The ULM intended to first bomb the State House using aircraft, and then launch a ground-based assault with guns and mortars. The aircraft was supposed to take off from Entebbe Airbase, and would be able to reach its target in seconds. Though the coup plotters wanted to kill Amin, other high-ranking government members were supposed to be captured so that they could be put on trial.

== Coup attempt ==
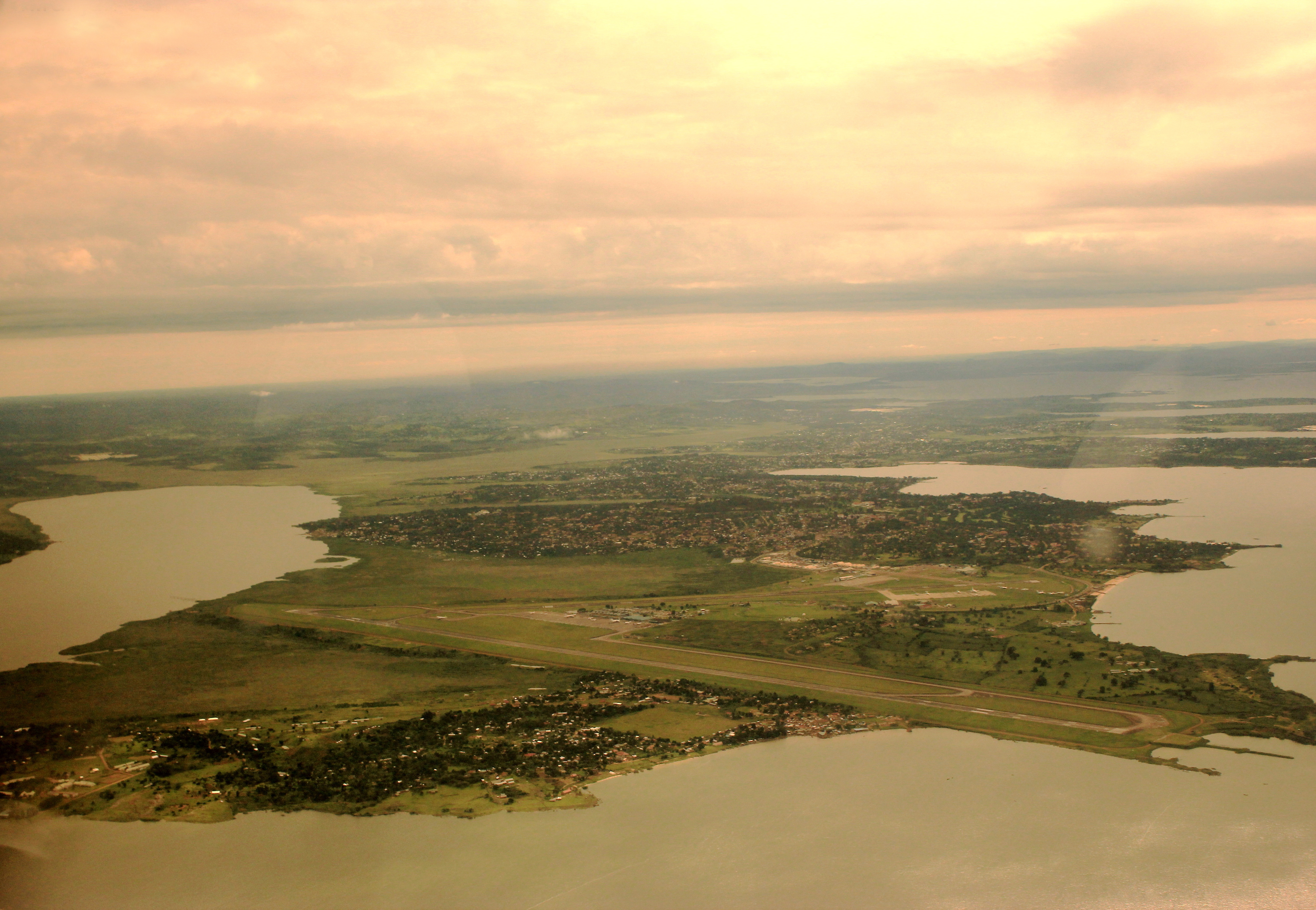
Entebbe in 2012.

The operation began at about 4 a.m. on 18 June, (Note: The coup attempt took place on 18 June according to The Washington Post and The Independent. In contrast, an article by the Drum stated that the operation occurred on 16 June.) when a group of low-ranking dissident soldiers brought a cache of weapons from Kampala to Entebbe. The group initially stored the guns at a shop, and then hid in the woods. By dawn, Amin was warned by the SRB that a coup attempt was underway; the origin of this leak was never firmly established. One ULM member, known only as "Peter", later claimed that one of the original coup plotters betrayed his comrades. Other coup plotters believed that the SRB had been informed of their plan by Andrew Mukooza, a UAAF pilot who had been contacted by Bazalaki, but refused to join the operation. Despite the warning, Amin's options were limited. Most loyal officers were not at their posts at the time, making it impossible for the President to quickly organize a large-scale counter-operation. Regardless, Amin quickly changed his plans for the day and sent some of his supporters to the Entebbe Airbase to round up suspected dissidents and immobilise all aircraft.

By mid-morning, the first ULM group had retrieved their guns and a second group of coup plotters began to advance from Kampala to Entebbe. The ULM leadership was warned that the President had discovered their plans at 11:30, but they could no longer halt the operation. Amin then attempted to escape from Entebbe to Kampala in security cars, wearing a bulletproof vest and protected by a large number of guards. The President hoped that this move would throw the plotters "off balance". However, his convoy ran into the coup plotters' second group, (Note: The Washington Post journalist Roger Mann stated that the clash occurred by accident, as the second group was not aware that Amin had changed his plans. This view was supported by one of the coup plotters who argued that this attack prevented Amin from running into a better-armed group of dissidents further down the road. The Drum instead claimed that this attack was an ambush, organized by some ULM members as a "desperate attempt to salvage the plot".) and a gunfight erupted at Baitababiri. The coup plotters did not know which car Amin was using, and thus shot at all in hopes of hitting the President.

Using hand grenades and their guns, the ULM members damaged several vehicles of the presidential convoy. Amin's guards quickly reacted, getting out of their cars and counter-attacking. The coup members then retreated into the woods, escaping before the presidential guards caught them. Amin was lightly wounded during the clash, reportedly resulting from his car's windows being shattered during the fighting.

The second ULM group's survivors then informed some of the coup leaders that the operation had failed, prompting them to flee. Bazalaki tried to warn the Kimumwe brothers that the SRB had learned of their involvement, but Patrick was arrested before he could reach them. Mutumba was also captured. However, Wilson Kimumwe was able to evade the security forces. Along with a lieutenant, three sergeants, a private, and two civilians he drove to the Kenyan border in a car, taking guns, hand grenades, and a RPG with them. The group was able to get past the roadblocks which had been erected by the loyalists after the coup attempt became known. Wilson Kimumwe and his comrades arrived at Bulega in Kenya about 4 p.m., and then called the Kenyan authorities to inform them that they wanted to surrender. Later on, a second car with five civilian ULM members arrived at Busia, Kenya. The defectors were interrogated and then brought to Kakamega; it was believed that they were soon released and went into hiding in Kenya. Their weapons were confiscated and transported to Nairobi. Bazalaki was also able to flee into exile.

== Aftermath ==
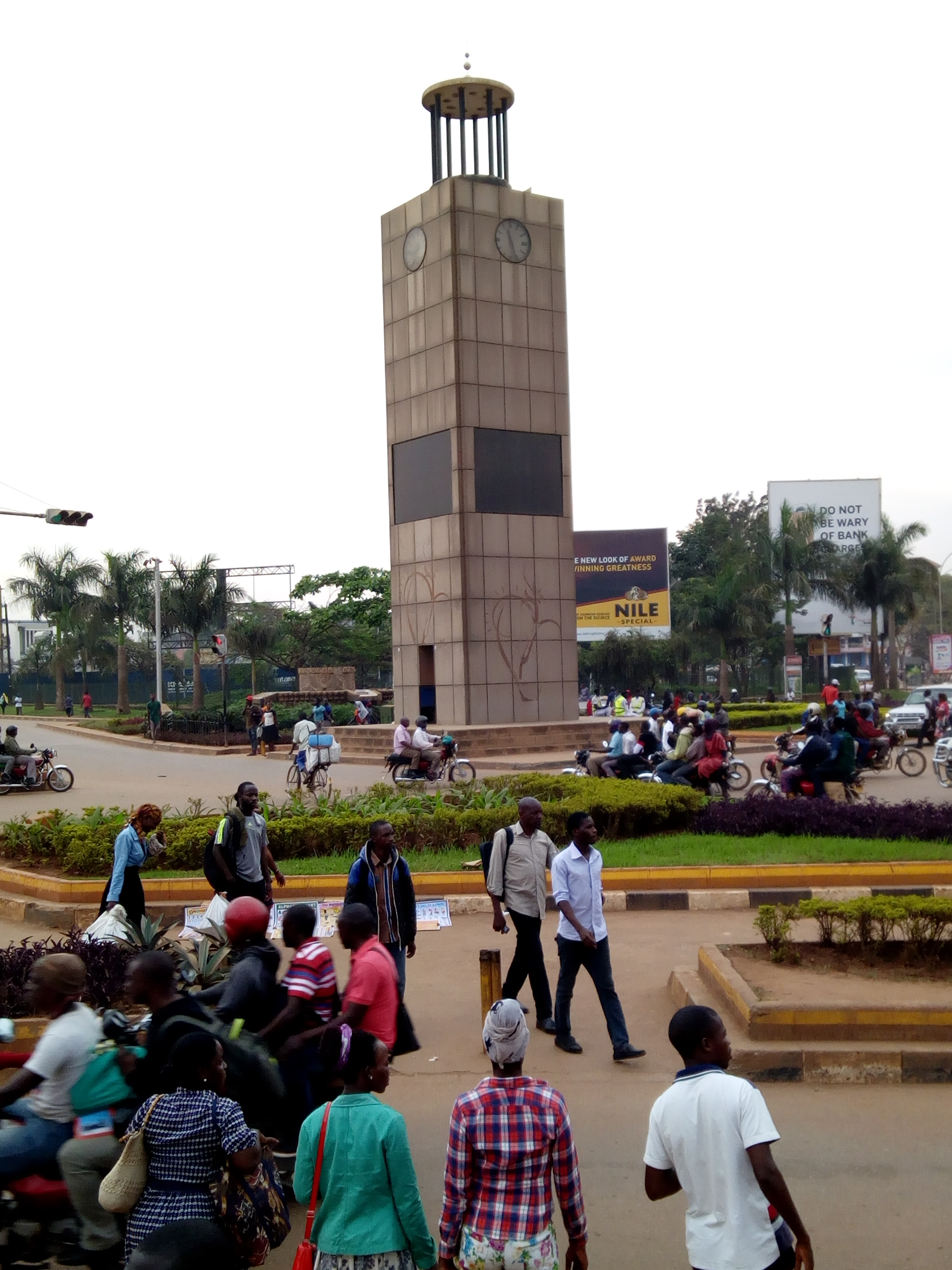
Twelve suspected coup plotters were executed at Kampala's clock tower (pictured 2017) after Operation Mafuta Mingi's failure.

In response to the coup attempt, Amin initiated a purge aimed at Baganda and Basoga soldiers, with many being killed. His security forces also targeted Baganda and Basoga people in general. Hundreds to thousands of members of these ethnic groups were rounded up and arbitrarily arrested. In addition, the President's loyalists intensely searched Baitababiri for suspected dissidents, breaking into houses, harassing the locals, and forcibly disappearing several civilians.

Amin also went into hiding, while the SRB organized a "joy-ride" of a body double through Kampala and Entebbe, hoping to provoke another attack and thus draw out more coup plotters. On 24 June, Radio Uganda declared that the President was fine, with Vice President Mustafa Adrisi stating that Amin was "very much alive and very fit". The broadcast did not mention the coup attempt, instead claiming that Amin had gone on a delayed honeymoon with his wife Sarah. Amin later admitted that an assassination attempt had taken place, but blamed "colonialists, imperialists and Zionists". He used the 14th Organisation of African Unity (OAU) summit in July 1977 to declare that the coup attempt had been part of a wider Western conspiracy to topple him and many other African heads of state.

The SRB also informed the President that Mukooza had stayed loyal during the coup attempt, whereupon the latter was promoted to lieutenant colonel and commander of the UAAF's MiG-17 squadron in August 1977. On 9 September 1977, twelve Ugandans were publicly shot in front of Kampala's clock tower after being convicted of treason by a military tribunal head by Juma Butabika. The men were accused of involvement in Operation Mafuta Mingi. Two other individuals were sentenced to 15 years in jail by the tribunal, while two were freed. (Note: The executed included John Kabandize (senior superintendent of the Mubuku prisons), E.N. Mutabazi (senior superintendent of the Kampala prisons), Peter Atua (Murchison Bay prison principal), Daniel Nsereko (police assistant commissioner and Foreign Affairs Ministry under-secretary), Ben Ogwang (Malire Battalion intelligence officer), Y.Y. Okot (chief inspector of schools), John Leji Olobo (senior industrial relations officer), Elias Okidi-menya (Lake Victoria Bottling Company general manager), Abdalla Anyuru (Uganda Public Services Commission chairman), Ben Ongom (businessman from Kampala), Julius Peter Adupa (Lira Polytechnic Institute teacher), Garison S. Anono (Bobi School Foundation principal). Boy Lango (a ticket examiner) and John Obinu (a hotel waiter) were imprisoned. John Ejura (Aboke High School principal) and Apollo Lawoko (controller of programmes at the Uganda Broadcasting Corporation) were released. The trial was described as a "travesty of justice, a 'show', since the conventions and pleas of guilt were obtained by force from the accused".) Amin ignored appeals for mercy by international figures including Liberian President William Tolbert and Gabonese President Omar Bongo. In contrast, the main conspirators of Operation Mafuta Mingi initially remained imprisoned, as Amin did not just want to kill them, but have them publicly confess first. On 23 September 1977, Kimumwe, Mutumba, and five other prisoners managed to escape from the SRB's prison at Nakasero and flee to Kenya, just before their scheduled execution. (Note: The escape was surrounded by various false rumours, including of Israeli involvement or a wider conspiracy within the Uganda Army.) Infuriated at the jailbreak, Amin removed SRB director Francis Itabuka from his position; his successor, Farouk Minawa, promptly launched new purges and ordered the arrest as well as murder of several people who were suspected of connections to Operation Mafuta Mingi.

In exile, Kimumwe and Mutumba wrote a book titled Inside Amin's Army about their experiences. Kimumwe became part of the militant anti-Amin opposition in Kenya, and eventually met Yoweri Museveni who invited him to join the Front for National Salvation. Amin was overthrown during the Uganda–Tanzania War of 1978–79. Kimumwe joined the Save Uganda Movement and fought for the anti-Amin rebels during the war, drowning when an insurgent vessel sank on Lake Victoria in December 1978. After Amin's deposition, Mukooza was secretly executed by the new Ugandan government, probably as a result of his alleged role in the failure of Operation Mafuta Mingi.
