= 1977 invasion of Uganda =

Failed attempt to overthrow Idi Amin

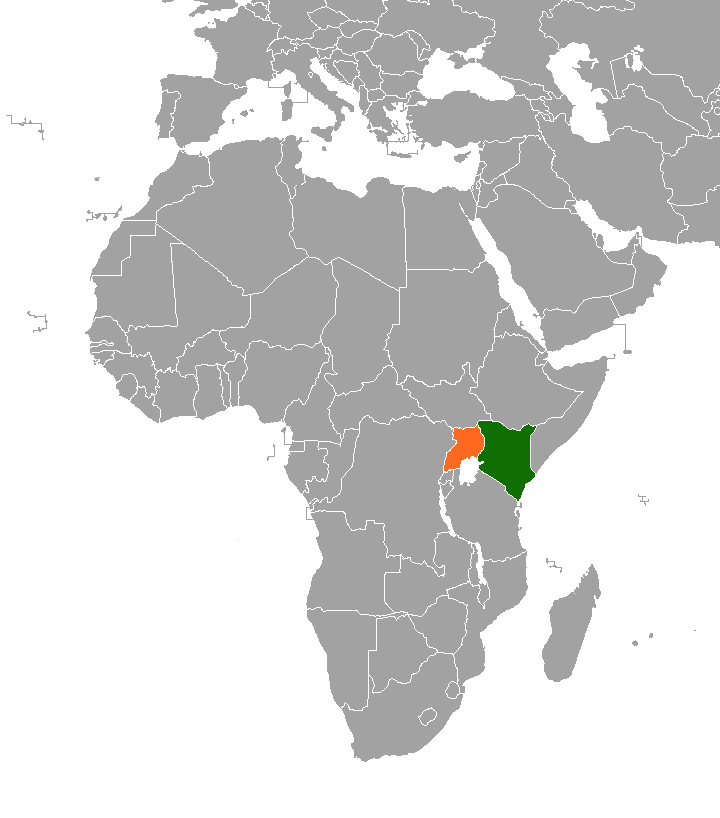
- Uganda (orange) was invaded by rebels from Kenya (green)
Date	October 1977
Location	Eastern Uganda
Result	Ugandan government victory

Belligerents
Uganda	Uganda Liberation Movement (Note: Not to be confused with other anti-Amin groups of the same name, such as the umbrella organization founded in 1973 or the military faction that launched the 1977 coup attempt code-named "Operation Mafuta Mingi".); Supported by: Israel (alleged)

Commanders and leaders
Idi Amin	Unknown

Units involved
Uganda Army; State Research Bureau	Various Kenya-based exile groups

Casualties and losses
Unknown	Several killed or captured

The 1977 invasion of Uganda was an armed attempt by Ugandan exiles to overthrow the government of President Idi Amin. The exiles were based in Kenya, organized as the "Uganda Liberation Movement", and enjoyed covert foreign support. A Ugandan intelligence agency and a member of the rebel group claimed that Israel was backing the insurgents, but this was not independently confirmed. The Ugandan government learned of the rebels' plans beforehand. The invasion consequently failed when the rebels were confronted and defeated by the Uganda Army after crossing the Kenya-Uganda border in October 1977. Amin stayed in power until being overthrown during the Uganda–Tanzania War.

== Background ==
In 1971, a military coup overthrew the President of Uganda, Milton Obote. Colonel Idi Amin installed himself as new Ugandan President and ruled the country under a repressive dictatorship. After the coup, Amin launched purges of his enemies, and empowered his own followers to consolidate his regime. The country's military, officially known as Uganda Army (UA), was most affected by this development. Much of its leadership was killed or expelled, while members of ethnic and religious groups supportive of Amin were recruited and promoted en masse. He also set up a new intelligence agency, the State Research Bureau (SRB) which operated a large network of informants.

Tens of thousands of Ugandans fled into exile during Amin's rule, and some organized political and militant groups with the aim of deposing him. Most of the armed opposition was based in Tanzania which had supported former President Obote and was most supportive of the anti-Amin movement. However, about ten thousand exiles lived in Kenya, a country which generally attempted to avoid conflicts with Uganda and consequently frowned upon anti-Amin activities. Despite this, at least a dozen clandestine exile groups emerged in Kenya over the years. They generally remained rather weak and fractured, partially due to Kenyan suppression of their work, partially due to them belonging to rival political movements. As most exile groups in Kenya were pro-Western, unlike many exiles in Tanzania, they enjoyed some low-key support from the United States, United Kingdom, and Israel. The Kenyan exiles were also aided by Christian organizations, some Western European political parties, and other "unusual patrons" such as American evangelist Billy Graham, international arms salesmen, and the Italian mafia.

== The Uganda Liberation Movement's plot and invasion ==
In 1976, Nairobi-based exiles formed the "Uganda Society", led by Martin Aliker and Yusuf Lule. The group requested weaponry and training from the United States and Israel, even meeting with United States Secretary of State Henry Kissinger. Based on their investigations, journalists Tony Avirgan and Martha Honey concluded that this lobbying resulted in the formation of the "Uganda Liberation Movement" in 1977. This group was not supported by the Kenyan government, but had gained some foreign support and access to weaponry. Avirgan and Honey were unable to verify if foreign mercenaries aided the rebels. One member of the Uganda Liberation Movement claimed that the group's fighters had trained in Israel, but his statements were doubted by other exiles. The State Research Bureau learned about the Uganda Liberation Movement's plans. The intelligence agency concluded that the rebel force included Israel-trained "commandos", and was supported by people inside Uganda, including army officer John Ruhinda, as well as foreign mercenaries from Israel, South Africa, and the United Kingdom. The SRB believed that the rebels planned to relocate to Tanzania from where they would launch an invasion. Avirgan and Honey described these conclusions as "mixture of fact and fancy", though generally in-line with reports by exiles.

Even though the Ugandan government had been warned by the SRB of the rebel plot and was prepared, the Uganda Liberation Movement's invasion did not go exactly as the intelligence agency had predicted. The insurgents did not relocate to Tanzania before beginning their attack, instead crossing the Uganda-Kenya border in October 1977. However, the rebels were quickly spotted by Uganda Army soldiers who opened fire. A few Uganda Liberation Movement militants were killed or captured, but most just broke and fled.

== Aftermath ==
Even though it had offered no support to the rebels, the Kenyan government was reportedly disappointed about the invasion's failure. It consequently continued to hamper the activities of anti-Amin exiles, but exiles continued to organize and plot against the Ugandan government from Kenya. Amin was overthrown during the Uganda–Tanzania War of 1978–79. Ugandan exiles including groups based in Kenya supported the Tanzanians during the conflict. Alleged Uganda Liberation Movement supporter John Ruhinda joined the pro-Tanzanian Uganda National Liberation Army during the Uganda–Tanzania War.
