= State Research Bureau (organisation) =

Ugandan intelligence agency (1971-1979)

Agency overview
- Formed: 1971
- Preceding agency: General Service Unit
- Dissolved: 1979
- Type: Secret police, intelligence agency
- Headquarters: Nakasero, Kampala
- Employees: ~3,000
- Agency executive: Director

The State Research Bureau (SRB), initially the State Research Centre (SRC), was a Ugandan intelligence agency. Active from 1971 until 1979, it served as a secret police organisation for President Idi Amin's regime. The SRB retained numerous agents and maintained a wide network of informants.

== Background ==
On 25 January 1971, Idi Amin, Commander of the Uganda Army, took power in Uganda following a coup which overthrew the government of President Milton Obote. His advisers suggested that he try to differentiate himself from Obote by disbanding the General Service Unit (GSU), Obote's intelligence agency, which was highly unpopular within the general populace.

== History ==
In February 1971, Amin dissolved the GSU and through a decree established the State Research Centre. Major Amin Ibrahim Onzi was appointed director, and technical assistance was sought from Israel in its formation. Its responsibilities were to gather military intelligence and conduct counterintelligence. The organisation was directly responsible to Amin.

In early 1972, Amin ejected Israeli technicians from Uganda and changed the name of the organisation to the State Research Bureau (SRB). Agents from the Soviet Union were brought in to replace them, and they instructed SRB personnel in the methods of the KGB. Many were sent to the Soviet Union for specialised training. Others undertook military and police training in the United States and United Kingdom.

...the headquarters of the State Research Bureau—like most of the things in Amin's Uganda, the name was a gross abuse of reality. There was neither research, nor were state matters dealt with, nor was it an office...thousands of Ugandans met their tortuous end in its subterranean cells.

— Journalist Godwin Matatu, 1979

The SRB recruited a substantial number of Rwandan immigrants, and attractive Rwandan Tutsi women were used as undercover operatives and stationed at airports, banks, hotels, restaurants, government offices, hospitals, and locations near Uganda's borders. Empowered by a sweeping February 1971 decree which gave state agents wide latitude to act, the SRB tortured and executed many suspected dissidents, provoking international outrage. Agents frequently abducted people by forcing them into the trunk of a car and driving off.

For its role in state repression and killings, the SRB came to be derisively known among the Ugandan population as the "State Research Butchery". One contemporary account argued that the SRB rarely collected actual intelligence, and its members instead used their powers to incriminate people whom they had grudges against.

In June 1974, in response to criticism of his regime and specifically accusations of numerous "disappearances" of persons in Uganda, Amin established a commission of inquiry to investigate abuses of state authority. The commission concluded that the SRB and another state security agency, the Public Safety Unit, were responsible for most of the disappearances. The abuses committed by the SRB was known among personnel of various international embassies in Kampala, though they generally did not publicly criticise it.

Despite its poor reputation, the SRB occasionally succeeded in uncovering plots aimed at deposing Amin. In 1977, it discovered that Ugandan exiles in Kenya were planning to invade Uganda. The SRB forewarned the President, and the Uganda Army successfully repelled the invasion. Over time, the SRB further devolved. By late 1978, agents had formed criminal gangs which fought each other, and in one case SRB members robbed a bank in Kampala.

The SRB also became less successful in eliminating suspected anti-Amin figures: Following the purge of Mustafa Adrisi in April 1978, SRB agents and Ugandan marines tried to massacre members of the Chui Battalion due to their suspected support for a pro-Adrisi coup, only to be gunned down by the soldiers. In October 1978, an attempt to arrest former minister Moses Ali ended in the death of 10 agents, following a shootout with his personal guards.

In the 1979 Uganda–Tanzania War, the SRB unsuccessfully attempted to stem the spread of civil unrest and guerrilla attacks against Amin's government. The agency also experienced more internal disputes, as members refused to join the fighting at the frontlines and were subsequently arrested by their colleagues. In April 1979, most SRB agents fled Kampala when the city fell to Tanzanian and Ugandan rebel forces. Amid the confusion, several prisoners managed to escape from less secure cells in the SRB headquarters. Shortly before the last agents left, they tossed grenades into the holding cells of the SRB headquarters, killing about 100 detainees. The Tanzanians freed 13 survivors. The new Ugandan government disbanded the SRB.

A few journalists visited SRB headquarters after the fall of Amin's regime. They discovered that few documents had been destroyed, removed or secured at the site, with much lying scattered around. The documents included extensive evidence of torture and murder committed by SRB agents. War correspondent Al J Venter stated that he was horrified by what he saw in the headquarters, writing "In 20 years of covering the African military beat, I have seen nothing like it. Not even in Biafra".

=== Legacy ===
SRB agents were hunted after the downfall of Amin, with many being extrajudicially killed by civilian mobs. As a result of the Rwandan members of the SRB, Rwandans gained a reputation of being violent and ruthless in Uganda. After Amin's overthrow, this reputation was used to justify anti-Rwandan violence and suppression in the following years.

== Organisation and methods ==
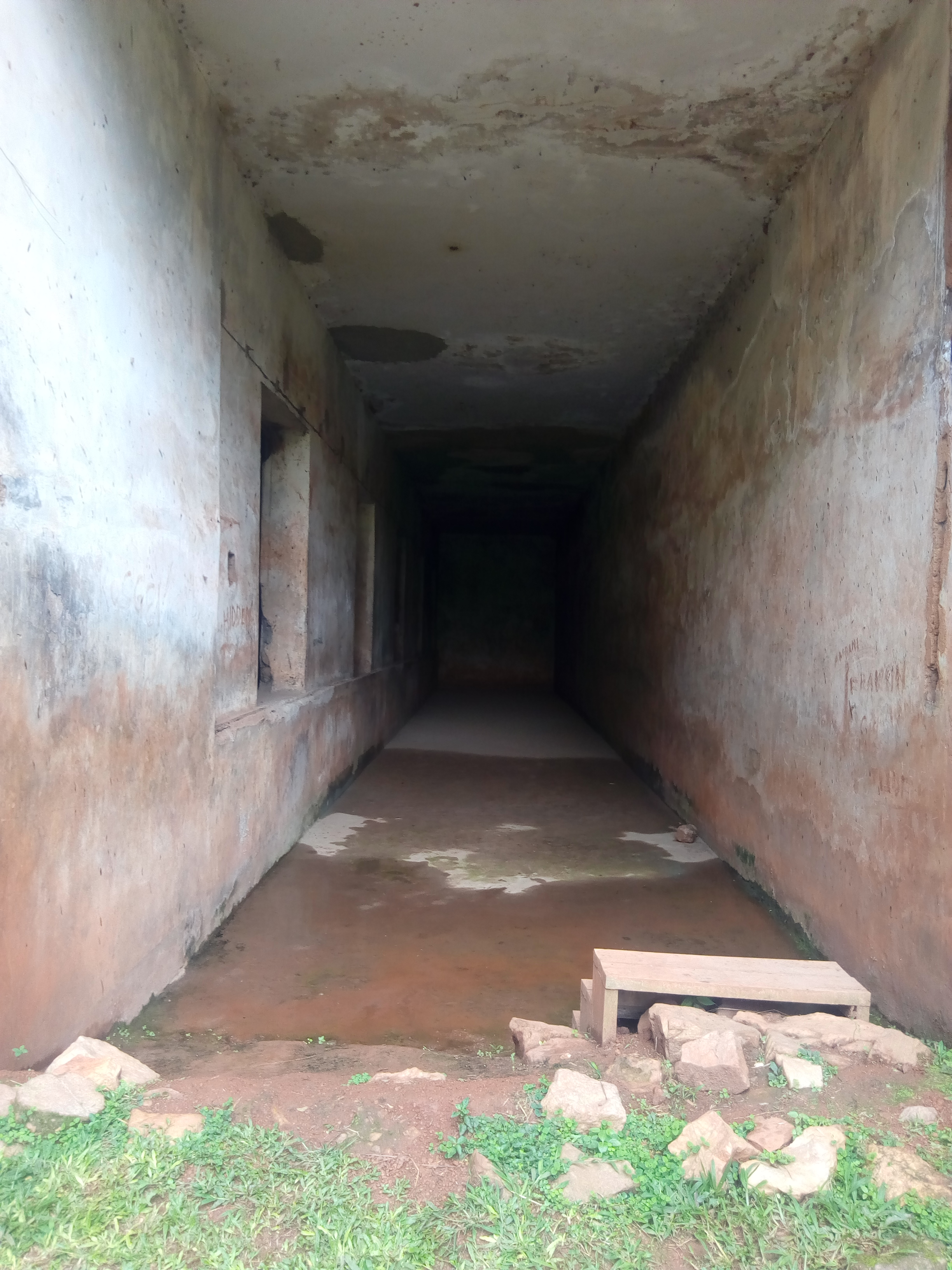
An Amin-era torture chamber in 2021

By 1979 the bureau employed about 3,000 men and women as agents, many of them Nubians and Rwandan immigrants. Male SRB agents commonly wore dark sunglasses, Kaunda suits, floral-print shirts, and bell-bottoms. Researcher Andrew Rice described them as "flagrant and fairly incompetent". Most personnel served for one year with the SRB before being reassigned to other government positions. Agents drove late model vehicles with special tags.

The SRB headquarters was in a building on Nakasero hill in Kampala, next to the State Lodge Annex. Its main building was painted in bright pink, and had three stories as well as a "huge subterranean chamber" where maximum security cells were located.

The agency maintained a widespread network of spies and informants, collecting information on political opposition and economic crimes. SRB agents closely watched all known foreigners in Uganda, and were responsible for the abduction and murder of many of them due to suspected dissident activities. When reading documents of the SRB after the Uganda–Tanzania War, Venter stated that the agency's approach to paperwork had an "unmistakable British colonial imprint" and was rather well organized. In its later years, the SRB made use of at least one computer.

SRB agents frequently abducted people by forcing them into the trunk of a car and driving off. The SRB headquarters became notorious for the human rights abuses committed within its walls; Venter described it as "one-way trip to hell". Ex-rebel Paul Oryema Opobo called it a "place of no return". Prisoners were "flayed, beaten, suffocated, tortured or electrocuted for hours at a stretch" before being executed.

Venter referenced one prisoner who had "his eyes gouged out with a screwdriver and his genitals removed with a pair of garden shears." Dead prisoners were mostly dumped in a forest near Kampala. As a large amount of marijuana was found in the headquarters after Amin's fall, Western journalists assumed that SRB agents had taken drugs to be mentally "fortified" during torture sessions.

== Notable personnel ==
=== Directors ===
- Amin Ibrahim Onzi.
- Francis Itabuka, 1974–1977.
- Farouk Minawa, from 1977.

=== Agents ===
- Faruk Malik.
- Salim Sebi.
