= International Criminal Court investigation in Uganda =

Situation in Uganda
- The seal of the International Criminal Court
- File no.: 02/04
- Referred by: Uganda
- Date referred: 16 December 2003
- Date opened: 29 July 2004
- Incident(s): LRA insurgency
- Crimes: Crimes against humanity: · Enslavement · Inhumane acts · Murder · Rape · Sexual enslavement War crimes: · Attacks against civilians · Cruel treatment · Enlisting of children · Inducing of rape · Murder · Pillaging

Status of suspects
- Joseph Kony: Fugitive
- Raska Lukwiya: Deceased
- Okot Odhiambo: Deceased
- Dominic Ongwen: Serving a 25 year sentence
- Vincent Otti: Deceased

The International Criminal Court investigation in Uganda or the situation in Uganda is an ongoing investigation by the International Criminal Court (ICC) into the Lord's Resistance Army insurgency which has been taking place in northern Uganda and neighbouring regions since 1987. The Lord's Resistance Army is a Christian-based group led by Joseph Kony that is accused of numerous human rights violations and war crimes including massacres, the abduction of civilians, the use of child soldiers, sexual enslavement, torture, and pillaging. After the government of Uganda referred the matter to the ICC in December 2003, warrants of arrest were issued in 2005 for Joseph Kony, Raska Lukwiya, Okot Odhiambo, Dominic Ongwen, and Vincent Otti, who became the first people to be indicted by the Court.

The proceedings against Raska Lukwiya, Vincent Otti and Okot Odhiambo terminated due to their deaths. Dominic Ongwen was caught and was convicted and sentenced to 25 years of imprisonment. Joseph Kony is still at large, and his case currently remains at the pre-trial stage, until he is arrested and transferred to the ICC in The Hague; the ICC does not try people in absentia, not present in the courtroom.

== Background ==
The Lord's Resistance Army (LRA) is a Christian-based rebel group that has been active in Uganda and neighbouring countries since 1987. The LRA is led by Joseph Kony, a former faith healer who founded the group on the theology of Alice Auma's failed Holy Spirit Movement. Kony claims to communicate with and receive instructions from spirits and from God. He also claims that his insurgency is for the betterment of the Acholi people, although he has been quoted as saying, "if the Acholi don't support us, they must be finished".

== Referral ==
The government of Uganda referred the situation to the Court on 16 December 2003. The referral was communicated via a letter sent by President Yoweri Museveni to the Prosecutor of the ICC, Luis Moreno Ocampo. The two met following the referral to establish the methods of cooperation between the Office of the Prosecutor and the government of Uganda. The two held a press conference in London on 29 January 2004 to publicly announce the referral. On 5 July 2004 the situation was assigned to Pre-Trial Chamber II by ICC President Philippe Kirsch. Moreno Ocampo announced the beginning of an official investigation on 29 July 2004.

== Charges ==
Moreno Ocampo applied to Pre-Trial Chamber II for warrants of arrest for Kony, Lukwiya, Odhiambo, Ongwen and Otti on 6 May 2005 and the warrants for all five men were issued under seal on 8 July of that year. The warrants were unsealed on 13 October 2005.

The five men are all indicted in the same case and the indictment lists 33 crimes: 21 counts of war crimes (listed below as WC) and 12 counts of crimes against humanity (listed below as CAH). The statute column contains the reference to the crime in the articles of the Rome Statute. Not all of the counts apply to all of the men, however they all apply to Joseph Kony and all but one applies to Vincent Otti. The counts on the indictment are as follows.

Count	CAH	WC	Crime	Statute	Kony	Lukwiya	Odhiambo	Ongwen	Otti
1	✓	✗	Sexual enslavement (and attempted)	Article 7(1)(g)	✓	✗	✗	✗	✓
2	✓	✗	Rape	Article 7(1)(g)	✓	✗	✗	✗	✗
3	✗	✓	Inducing of rape	Article 8(2)(e)(vi)	✓	✗	✗	✗	✓
4	✗	✓	Attack against a civilian population	Article 8(2)(e)(i)	✓	✗	✗	✗	✓
5	✗	✓	Enlisting of children	Article 8(2)(e)(vii)	✓	✗	✗	✗	✓
6	✓	✗	Enslavement	Article 7(1)(c)	✓	✓	✗	✗	✓
7	✗	✓	Cruel treatment	Article 8(2)(c)(i)	✓	✓	✗	✗	✓
8	✗	✓	Attack against a civilian population	Article 8(2)(e)(i)	✓	✓	✗	✗	✓
9	✗	✓	Pillaging	Article 8(2)(e)(v)	✓	✓	✗	✗	✓
10	✓	✗	Murder	Article 7(1)(a)	✓	✗	✓	✗	✓
11	✓	✗	Enslavement	Article 7(1)(c)	✓	✗	✓	✗	✓
12	✗	✓	Murder	Article 8(2)(c)(i)	✓	✗	✓	✗	✓
13	✗	✓	Enlisting of children	Article 8(2)(c)(i)	✓	✗	✓	✗	✓
14	✗	✓	Attack against a civilian population	Article 8(2)(e)(i)	✓	✗	✓	✗	✓
15	✗	✓	Pillaging	Article 8(2)(e)(v)	✓	✗	✓	✗	✓
16	✓	✗	Murder	Article 7(1)(a)	✓	✗	✓	✗	✓
17	✗	✓	Murder	Article 8(2)(c)(i)	✓	✗	✓	✗	✓
18	✗	✓	Attack against a civilian population	Article 8(2)(e)(i)	✓	✗	✓	✗	✓
19	✗	✓	Pillaging	Article 8(2)(e)(v)	✓	✗	✓	✗	✓
20	✓	✗	Murder	Article 7(1)(a)	✓	✗	✗	✗	✓
21	✓	✗	Enslavement	Article 7(1)(c)	✓	✗	✗	✗	✓
22	✓	✗	Inhumane acts	Article 7(1)(k)	✓	✗	✗	✗	✓
23	✗	✓	Murder	Article 8(2)(c)(i)	✓	✗	✗	✗	✓
24	✗	✓	Cruel treatment	Article 8(2)(c)(i)	✓	✗	✗	✗	✓
25	✗	✓	Attack against a civilian population	Article 8(2)(e)(i)	✓	✗	✗	✗	✓
26	✗	✓	Pillaging	Article 8(2)(e)(v)	✓	✗	✗	✗	✓
27	✓	✗	Murder	Article 7(1)(a)	✓	✗	✗	✓	✓
28	✓	✗	Enslavement	Article 7(1)(c)	✓	✗	✗	✓	✓
29	✓	✗	Inhumane acts	Article 7(1)(k)	✓	✗	✗	✓	✓
30	✗	✓	Murder	Article 8(2)(c)(i)	✓	✗	✗	✓	✓
31	✗	✓	Cruel treatment	Article 8(2)(c)(i)	✓	✗	✗	✓	✓
32	✗	✓	Attack against a civilian population	Article 8(2)(e)(i)	✓	✗	✗	✓	✓
33	✗	✓	Pillaging	Article 8(2)(e)(v)	✓	✗	✗	✓	✓

== Court proceedings ==
The prosecution of the five suspects was initially consolidated into one case. Raska Lukwiya was dropped as a defendant following the confirmation of his death.

=== The Prosecutor v. Joseph Kony, Vincent Otti, Okot Odhiambo and Dominic Ongwen ===
As of 2006, all four suspects were considered to be at large as fugitives and their whereabouts were unknown. On 1 June 2006 Interpol issued red notices for all the suspects. Kony was still believed to be leading the LRA in 2021, which was accused of perpetrating additional crimes. Both were suspected to be in either Uganda or a neighboring country. In 2009 Odhiambo told Agence France-Presse that he had defected from the LRA, but would only surrender if there were a guarantee that he would not be turned over to the Court.

In December 2007, BBC News reported that on 2 October 2007, Otti had been executed on orders from Kony. Kony later confirmed Otti's death to a mediator between the Ugandan government and the LRA. As of 1 December 2022, the Court considered Otti to still be at large, after considering the evidence, stating that the lack of a body, the lack of a death certificate, and the lack of direct witnesesses to Otti's would-be death were insufficient evidence.

=== Raska Lukwiya ===
Lukwiya's case was joined with other defendants' pending confirmation of his death 12 August 2006 in a battle with the Ugandan military. After the Uganda government confirmed his death, the Court terminated proceedings against him on 11 July 2007.

=== The Prosecutor v. Dominic Ongwen ===
Dominic Ongwen was the Brigade Commander of the Sinia Brigade of the Lord's Resistance Army (LRA), at time of his arrest warrant. Warrant for his arrest was issued on 8 July 2005. He was charged with 61 counts of crimes against humanity and war crimes allegedly committed after 1 July 2002 in northern Uganda. Trial of these charges began on 6 December 2016.

On 4 February 2021, Dominic Ongwen was found guilty of 61 crimes by Trial Chamber IX of ICC, comprising crimes against humanity and war crimes, committed in Northern Uganda between 1 July 2002 and 31 December 2005. He was sentenced to 25 years of imprisonment. He appealed against both conviction and sentence. As of, the appeal was pending.
