= Regional Cooperation Initiative for the elimination of the LRA =

- Abbreviation: RCI-LRA
- Formation: 22 November 2011; 14 years ago
- Dissolved: September 20, 2018; 7 years ago
- Headquarters: Yambio, South Sudan
- Chair: AU Commissioner for Peace and Security
- Parent organization: African Union

Regional Task Force
- Active: 2011 – 2018
- Countries: Uganda, DRC, South Sudan, CAR
- Allegiance: African Union
- Type: Multinational force
- Role: Combined operations
- Size: 3,350 (2013)
- Nickname: AU-RTF
- Engagements: Counter-LRA operations

The Regional Cooperation Initiative for the elimination of the LRA (Note: Some sources use the variant "Regional Cooperation Initiative against the LRA".) (RCI-LRA) with its military arm, the African Union Regional Task Force (AU-RTF or RTF) was a multi-national operation to counter the Lord's Resistance Army (LRA). On 22 November 2011 the AU Peace and Security Council authorized the RCI-LRA with the mandate to "strengthen the operational capabilities of the countries affected by the atrocities of the LRA, create an environment conducive to the stabilization of the affected areas, free of LRA atrocities, and facilitate the delivery of humanitarian aid to affected areas." The United Nations provided logistical support, the European Union and African Union contributed additional funding, and the United States provided non-combat military and strategic support.

Operations began in central Africa in March 2012. RTF military operations effectively ended in mid-2017 with the withdrawal of Ugandan and U.S. troops, and the AU officially ended the RCI-LRA on 20 September 2018.

== Background ==
In November 2011, the African Union's (AU) Peace and Security Council authorised a Regional Co-operation Initiative for the elimination of the Lord's Resistance Army (sometimes referred to as RCI-LRA). The so-called Lord's Resistance Army is an armed group originating in northern Uganda and responsible for widespread murder, torture, child abduction, sex slavery and forced recruitment of child 'soldiers'. The group had been forced out of Uganda and was roaming remote areas of (what is now) South Sudan, the Democratic Republic of the Congo and the Central African Republic.

Prior to the formation of the AU-RTF Uganda had conducted military raids into the Democratic Republic of Congo, targeting LRA camps (see article 2008–09 Garamba offensive). Most notably Operation Lightning Thunder, launched on 14 December 2008, saw aerial bombardment of the main LRA camp in the Garamba National Park, Democratic Republic of the Congo. This was followed by ground troops searching former rebel camps.

During July 2005, the International Criminal Court issued arrest warrants for the founder and leader of the Lord's Resistance Army, Joseph Kony, together with four of his top leaders. Of these, Raska Lukwiya was killed on 12 August 2006, and deputy leader Vincent Otti was executed by firing squad, on Kony’s orders, on 2 October 2007. Thus at the time the AU Regional Task Force was formed Joseph Kony, Okot Odhiambo and Dominic Ongwen were still at large.

== Organization ==
The RCI-LRA was planned to comprise three elements: a Joint Co-ordination Mechanism, chaired by the AU Commissioner for Peace and Security and made up of the Ministers of Defence of the four affected countries (Uganda, South Sudan, Democratic Republic of the Congo and the Central African Republic); a Regional Task Force Headquarters; and, third, the Regional Task Force (AU-RTF) of up to 5,000 troops from the four countries.

The AU-RTF took form in September 2012, when 360 troops of the Central African Republic's Forces Armées Centrafricaines (FACA) were 'handed over' to the Task Force at Obo in the CAR. Days later, on 18 September 2012, an additional 2000 Ugandan troops and 500 South Sudanese troops were 'handed over' at Yambio in South Sudan. On 13 February 2013, five hundred Congolese troops of a light infantry battalion at Dungu were added to the RTF. This raised the Force to 3,350 (of a total authorised strength of 5,000) and completed the three Sectors envisioned with bases at Dungu (DRC), Obo (CAR) and Nzara (South Sudan). Force headquarters is at Yambio in South Sudan, The first Force Commander was Ugandan Colonel, later acting Brigadier Dick Olum (UPDF) and the Deputy Force Commander was Colonel Gabriel Ayok Akuok (of South Sudan’s Sudan People’s Liberation Army).

== United States involvement ==
United States Special Forces had, since 2010, been assisting Ugandan forces in their operations against the LRA in the Democratic Republic of the Congo and the Central African Republic. These forces continued to assist the AU-RTF through to early 2017. But in March 2017 it was reported that U.S. operations would shortly be coming to an end after the Lord's Resistance Army had been reduced to a point of 'irrelevance'.

== Operations ==
In mid-2013, after nine months of operations, Brigadier Dick Olum went to serve with the Ugandan contingent in Somalia as part of the African Union Mission in Somalia. Ugandan Brigadier Sam Kavuma replaced him as Commander of the AU-RTF. Intensified operations against the rebel group were then indicated by the launch of 'Operation Monsoon' on 9 August 2013. It was soon afterwards announced that Okot Odhiambo, one of the LRA's top leaders, was killed. His death was later confirmed as having occurred on 27 October 2013.

A major success occurred on 28 November 2013, when the camp of one of the few remaining rebel bands was reported destroyed. In what may have been the same skirmish a rebel commander – 'Colonel' Samuel Kangul – was killed, along with 13 fighters, when AU-RTF elements ambushed a meeting of two rebel bands on the banks of River Vovodo near its confluence with the Ofoto and Chinko tributaries. Ten AK-47 assault rifles, one PKM machine-gun, five hand guns, more than 10,000 rounds of ammunition and communications gear were captured.

In October 2014, AU-RTF Commander Brigadier Sam Kavuma was deployed to Somalia and his place taken by Brigadier Lucky Kidega. By March 2016 the Ugandan AU-RTF Commander was Colonel Richard Otto.

Eventually another success was scored by the AU-RTF when the second-highest ranking rebel in the LRA – 'Major General' Dominic Ongwen – surrendered to Seleka rebels in the Central African Republic on 3 January 2015. Ongwen was transferred to U.S Special Forces and then Ugandan elements of the AU-RTF.

AU-RTF operations were plagued with difficulties even beyond those that might be expected of a multi-national force operating in remote areas across several countries. During March 2013, Seleka rebels overthrew the government of the Central African Republic (CAR), which reduced CAR involvement and made operations in parts of that country difficult. Then, on 15 December 2013, fighting broke out in South Sudan between the central government and forces supporting the former Vice-President, Riek Machar. To add to the difficulties, Ugandan forces were restricted from operating in the DRC.

On 29/30 June 2014, UPDF elements of the AU-RTF clashed with Seleka fighters at Zako and Kono villages, in the Central African Republic close to the border with the Democratic Republic of the Congo. It was reported that 12 to 15 rebels were killed while the UPDF lost one to three of their own personnel.

During January 2016, the UPDF’s 11 Battalion was based in CAR with the AU-RTF. In mid-2016, it was reported that Uganda would withdraw its contribution to the AU-RTF. But AU-RTF operations were apparently continuing in late 2016, when a member of the Task Force was reported abducted by a rebel group in South Sudan's Gbudue State.

On 19 April 2017, not long after the announcement of the United States' troop withdrawal, Uganda announced the end of LRA pursuit operations in the Central African Republic. The rebel group was thought to have been depleted to the point where it no longer presented a military threat, although local people and non-government agencies expressed concern at Uganda's withdrawal from the Central African Republic.

== See also ==
- African Union Mission in Somalia
- United Nations-African Union Mission in Darfur
- Multinational Joint Task Force
- United Nations Force Intervention Brigade
