= Lord's Resistance Army insurgency =

Ongoing conflict in central Africa since 1987

- Part of Cold war (until 1991) and the Congolese Civil Wars
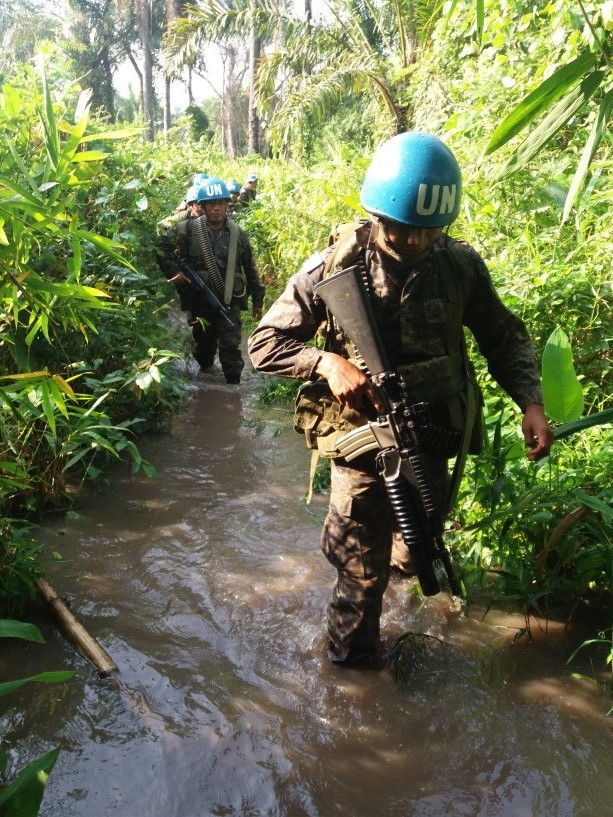
- Patrol of the Guatemalan contingent of MONUSCO against the LRA activities in Haut-Uele, DR Congo, during "Operation Red Kite", July 2017
Date	1987 – present (39 years)
Location	Northern Uganda (until 2006), South Sudan, eastern DR Congo, Central African Republic
Status	Ongoing (Low-level): Founder and leader of the LRA Joseph Kony goes into hiding; Senior LRA commander Dominic Ongwen surrenders to American forces in the Central African Republic and is tried at the Hague; Majority of LRA installations and encampments located in South Sudan and Uganda abandoned and dismantled; Small scale LRA activity continues in eastern DR Congo, and the Central African Republic; Multiple generals killed in a raid by Russian PMCs in Sudan

Belligerents
Uganda; DR Congo (from 1997); Central African Republic (from 2008); South Sudan; Arrow Boys; UFDR; (United Nations) MONUC; Russia (since April 2024); Wagner Group	Lord's Resistance Army

Commanders and leaders
(Uganda) Yoweri Museveni; (Uganda) Robinah Nabbanja; (Democratic Republic of the Congo) Félix Tshisekedi; (Democratic Republic of the Congo) Sama Lukonde; (Central African Republic) Faustin-Archange Touadéra; (Central African Republic) Félix Moloua; (South Sudan) Salva Kiir; (United Nations) Bintou Keita; Former: (Uganda) Samson Kisekka; (Uganda) George Cosmas Adyebo; (Uganda) Kintu Musoke; (Uganda) Apolo Nsibambi; (Uganda) Amama Mbabazi; (Uganda) Ruhakana Rugunda; Mobutu Sese Seko; Mabi Mulumba; Jules Fontaine Sambwa; Léon Kengo wa Dondo; Lunda Bululu; Mulumba Lukoji; Étienne Tshisekedi; Bernardin Mungul Diaka; Jean Nguza Karl-i-Bond; Faustin Birindwa; Likulia Bolongo; (Democratic Republic of the Congo) Antoine Gizenga; (Democratic Republic of the Congo) Adolphe Muzito; (Democratic Republic of the Congo) Louis Alphonse Koyagialo; (Democratic Republic of the Congo) Matata Ponyo Mapon; (Democratic Republic of the Congo) Samy Badibanga; (Democratic Republic of the Congo) Bruno Tshibala; (Democratic Republic of the Congo) Sylvestre Ilunga; (Central African Republic) François Bozizé; (Central African Republic) Michel Djotodia; (Central African Republic) Alexandre-Ferdinand Nguendet; (Central African Republic) Catherine Samba-Panza; (Central African Republic) Nicolas Tiangaye; (Central African Republic) André Nzapayeké; (Central African Republic) Mahamat Kamoun; (Central African Republic) Simplice Sarandji; (Central African Republic) Firmin Ngrébada; (Central African Republic) Henri-Marie Dondra; (Central African Republic) Joseph Zoundeiko; (United Nations) Leila Zerrougui; (United Nations) Maman Sambo Sidikou; (United Nations) Martin Kobler; (United Nations) Roger A. Meece; (United Nations) Alan Doss; (United Nations) William L. Swing; (United Nations) Amos Namanga Ngongi; (United Nations) Kamel Morjane	Joseph Kony; Vincent Otti (executed); Raska Lukwiya †; Okot Odhiambo †; Dominic Ongwen (surrendered); Alphonse Lamola; Doctor Achaye (surrendered)

Units involved
(Uganda) UPDF; (Democratic Republic of the Congo) FARDC; (Central African Republic) FACA; SPLA	No specific units

Strength
2002: (Uganda) 65,000−75,000; 2010: (Uganda) 46,800; 2014: (Uganda) 1,500	1990: 200−800; 1998: 6,000; 2007: 840−3,000; 2014: 240; 2022: 200−1,000

Casualties and losses
Unknown	~600 killed (2009–2010)
- 100,000-200,000+ killed 400,000–430,000+ displaced

The Lord's Resistance Army insurgency is an ongoing conflict between the Lord's Resistance Army (LRA), a Ugandan militant religious extremist group, against the government of Uganda. Following the Ugandan Civil War, militant Joseph Kony formed the Lord's Resistance Army and launched an insurgency against the newly installed President Yoweri Museveni. The stated goal was to establish a Christian state based on the Ten Commandments. Currently, there is low-level LRA activity in eastern areas of the Democratic Republic of the Congo and the Central African Republic. Kony proclaims himself the 'spokesperson' of God and a spirit medium.

The insurgency has become one of Africa's longest conflicts and has resulted in a lasting humanitarian crisis. The LRA has been accused by the International Criminal Court of widespread human rights violations, including mutilation, torture, slavery, rape, the abduction of civilians, the use of child soldiers, and a number of massacres. By 2004, the LRA had abducted more than 20,000 children, caused the displacement of 1.5 million civilians, and killed an estimated 100,000 civilians.

== Background ==
The National Resistance Army (NRA), commanded by Yoweri Museveni, overthrew President Tito Okello in January 1986. In retaliation for the Ugandan Army's actions in the Luwero triangle, the NRA committed numerous acts of brutality against the Acholi. Fearing the loss of their customary dominance over the national military, some Acholis rebelled. By August, the northern districts held by the new government forces had erupted into a full-fledged popular insurrection.

== Timeline ==
=== Early history (1987–1994) ===
In January 1987, Joseph Kony made his first appearance as a spirit medium, one of many who emerged following the initial success of the Holy Spirit Movement of Alice Auma.

Former Uganda People's Democratic Army commander Odong Latek convinced Kony to adopt conventional guerrilla warfare tactics, primarily surprise attacks on civilian targets, such as villages. The LRA also occasionally carried out large-scale attacks to underline the inability of the government to protect the populace. Until 1991, the LRA raided the populace for supplies, which were carried away by villagers who were abducted for short periods of time. The fact that some NRA units were known for their brutal actions ensured that the LRA were given at least passive support by segments of the Acholi population.

March 1991 saw the start of "Operation North", which combined efforts to destroy the LRA while cutting away its roots of support among the population through heavy-handed tactics. As part of Operation North, Acholi Betty Oyella Bigombe, the Minister charged with ending the insurgency, created the Arrow Boys, a local militia mostly armed with bows, arrows, and other traditional weapons as a form of local defense. As the LRA was armed with modern weaponry, the Arrow Boys were severely underpowered.

The creation of the Arrow Groups angered Kony, who began to feel that he no longer had the support of the population. In response, the LRA mutilated numerous Acholi whom they believed to be government supporters. While the government efforts were a failure, the LRA reaction caused many Acholi to finally turn against the insurgency. However, this was tempered by the deep-seated antagonism towards the occupying government forces.

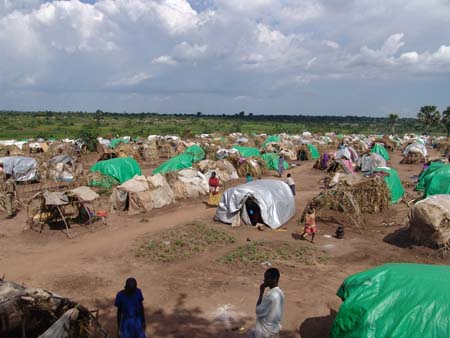
The conflict forces many civilians to live in internally displaced person (IDP) camps.

Following Operation North, Bigombe initiated the first face-to-face meeting between representatives of the LRA and the government. The LRA asked for a general amnesty for their combatants and stated that they would not surrender but were willing to "return home." However, the government's stance was hampered by disagreement over the credibility of the LRA negotiators and political infighting. In particular, the military had learned that Kony was negotiating with the Sudanese government for support while talking to Bigombe and felt that Kony was simply trying to buy time.

At a second meeting on 10 January 1994, Kony asked for six months to regroup his troops. By early February the tone of the negotiations was growing increasingly acrimonious, and following a meeting on 2 February, the LRA broke off negotiations stating that they felt that the NRA was trying to entrap them. Four days later, President Yoweri Museveni announced a seven-day deadline for the LRA to surrender. This ultimatum ended the Bigombe Initiative.

=== Spillover into neighboring countries (1994–2002) ===
Two weeks after Museveni delivered his ultimatum of 6 February 1994, it was reported that LRA fighters had crossed the northern border and established bases in southern Sudan with the approval of the Khartoum government. Sudanese aid was a response to Ugandan support for the rebel Sudan People's Liberation Army (SPLA) fighting in the civil war in the south of the country. Also, convinced that the Acholi were now collaborating with the Museveni government, Kony began to target civilians with his increased military strength. Mutilations became commonplace (especially cutting off ears, lips, and nose), and 1994 saw the first mass abduction of children and youth.

The most infamous of these was the Aboke abductions of 139 female students in October 1996. As most of the LRA combatants are abducted children, a military offensive against the LRA is widely perceived by the Acholi as a massacre of victims. Government attempts to destroy the rebels are thus viewed as another cause for grievance by the Acholi. The moral ambiguity of this situation, in which abducted young rebels are both the victims and perpetrators of brutal acts, is central to the conflicted attitudes of many Acholi towards the rebels.

The government's response was a scorched-earth policy ordering all Acholis to leave their homes in 48 hours and move to "protected villages" beginning in 1996, later called Internally Displaced People's Camps. This further deepened the antagonistic attitude that many Acholi had toward the government, especially as the population continued to be attacked by the LRA even within the "protected camps." The camps were crowded, unsanitary, miserable places to live and have been described as death camps. World Health Organization data indicated that these camps caused the death of ten times as many people as the LRA.

Meanwhile, in 1997 the Sudanese government of the National Islamic Front began to recede from its previous hardline stance. Following the 11 September 2001 attacks in the US, the relationship between Sudan and Uganda abruptly changed. Cross-border tensions eased as support to proxy forces fell. Some of the hundreds of thousands of civilians displaced by the war began to return home. The number of people displaced by the conflict declined to about half a million, and people began to talk openly about the day when the "protected camps" would be disbanded.

=== Operation Iron Fist and continued insurgency (2002–2005) ===
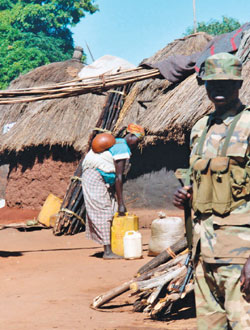
A government soldier guarding the Labuje IDP camp, Kitgum, Uganda

In March 2002, the Uganda People's Defence Force (UPDF) launched a massive military offensive, named "Operation Iron Fist", against the LRA bases in southern Sudan, with agreement from the National Islamic Front. This agreement, coupled with the return of Ugandan forces that were deployed in the Democratic Republic of Congo upon the official end of the Second Congo War, created what the Ugandan government felt was an ideal situation in which to end a conflict that had become both an embarrassment and political liability. After several months of uncertainty, LRA forces began crossing back into Uganda and carrying out attacks on a scale of brutality not seen since 1995 to 1996, resulting in widespread displacement and suffering in regions, such as Soroti, that had never previously been touched by the insurgency.

A series of local initiatives spearheaded by traditional and religious leaders as well as diplomatic initiatives during these years failed, especially since Kony's negotiating position remained uncertain, but the conflict gained unprecedented international coverage. During a November 2003 field visit to Uganda, United Nations Undersecretary-General for Humanitarian Affairs and Emergency Relief Coordinator Jan Egeland stated, "I cannot find any other part of the world that is having an emergency on the scale of Uganda, that is getting such little international attention." In December 2003, Ugandan President Museveni referred the LRA to the International Criminal Court (ICC) to determine if the LRA is guilty of international war crimes.

From the middle of 2004 on, rebel activity dropped markedly under intense military pressure. The government was also the target of increasingly pointed criticism from the international community for its failure to end the conflict. International aid agencies questioned the Ugandan government's reliance on military force and its commitment to a peaceful resolution. The army also admitted that it had recruited child soldiers who escaped the LRA into the military.

In mid-September 2005, a band of LRA fighters, led by Vincent Otti, crossed into the Democratic Republic of the Congo (DRC) for the first time. President Museveni declared that, if Congolese authorities did not disarm the LRA combatants, the UPDF would be sent across the border in pursuit. This sparked a diplomatic row between the governments of the DRC and Uganda, with both militaries making a show of force along their border, while the Congolese ambassador to the United Nations sent a letter to the UN Secretary-General demanding that an economic embargo be placed on Uganda in retaliation.

=== Peace talks and truce (2006–2008) ===
A series of meetings were held in Juba starting in July 2006 between the government of Uganda and the LRA. The talks were mediated by Riek Machar, the Vice President of Southern Sudan, and by the Community of Sant'Egidio. The talks, which resulted in a ceasefire by September 2006, were described as the best chance for a negotiated settlement since the peace initiative of Betty Bigombe in 1994.

These talks were agreed to after Joseph Kony released a video in May in which he denied committing atrocities and seemed to call for an end to hostilities, in response to an announcement by Museveni that he would guarantee the safety of Kony if peace was agreed to by July. In late June 2006, the Government of Southern Sudan formally invited Uganda to attend peace talks, and on 14 July 2006, talks began in Juba. On 4 August 2006, Vincent Otti declared a unilateral ceasefire and asked the Ugandan government to reciprocate. ICC indictee Raska Lukwiya was killed in battle on 12 August 2006.

The government and the LRA signed a truce on 26 August 2006. Under the terms of the agreement, LRA forces will leave Uganda and gather in two assembly areas protected by the government of Sudan. The Ugandan government agreed not to attack those areas. LRA rebels had begun gathering in the assembly areas by mid-September. Talks continued to be hindered by demands and counter-demands. Meanwhile, the government began a process of creating "satellite camps" to decongest the main IDP camps.

In a broader context, the government of Southern Sudan viewed the talks as a means of ridding itself of a foreign army that was complicating its delicate relationship with the Khartoum government. The request by the Ugandan Government for the ICC to suspend war crimes indictments against leaders of the LRA was condemned by international human rights groups but largely supported by leaders and civilians within northern Uganda.

By mid-2007, thousands of IDPs had moved into the decongestion camps. However, the populace remained cautious about the prospect of a peace deal, with many refusing to return to their ancestral homes before a definitive end to the insurgency.

Following a period in which the peace talks were suspended, the Juba Initiative Project enabled the resumption of the talks in May 2007, thanks to the efforts of the United Nations Special Representative of the Secretary-General for LRA-affected areas, Joaquim Chissano. The talks were again mediated by the Government of Southern Sudan, but with the support of the United Nations and logistic facilitation from the Office for the Coordination of Humanitarian Affairs (OCHA).

On 20 August 2007, Uganda declared that it was seeking legal advice on setting up a war crimes court. In November 2007, an LRA delegation led by Martin Ojul journeyed to Kampala to restate its commitment to a peaceful resolution of the conflict. Ojul later led the delegation on a tour of northern Uganda to meet victims of the insurgency and ask their forgiveness. However, reports surfaced that LRA deputy commander Otti had been executed on or around 8 October 2007 over an internal power struggle with Kony.

=== Renewed fighting (2008–present) ===
In February 2008, LRA launched its first known attack in the Central African Republic in Bassigbiri, Haut-Mbomou. In the next month, LRA raided the first major town in Haut-Mbomou, Obo.

In June 2008, diplomats reported that the Lord's Resistance Army had bought new weapons and was recruiting new soldiers, adding 1,000 recruits to the 600 soldiers it already had. At about the same time, Uganda, South Sudan, and Congo-Kinshasa agreed to a plan to crush the movement together; the South Sudanese Government claimed that the Lord's Resistance Army killed 14 of their soldiers in a raid on June 7 2008, in Nabanga, DR Congo.

The LRA was alleged to have killed at least 400 people in attacks on a number of villages in the DR Congo on and after Christmas Day, 2008. Throughout 2009, the LRA was blamed for several attacks in Southern Sudan, DR Congo, and Central African Republic. In March 2010, news emerged about a December 2009 massacre in DR Congo perpetrated by the LRA.

In May 2010, US President Barack Obama signed the Lord's Resistance Army Disarmament and Northern Uganda Recovery Act into law. In October 2011, Obama announced the deployment of 100 US troops to aid other anti-LRA forces in subduing LRA leader Joseph Kony, citing the aforementioned act in a letter to the heads of both houses of Congress.

On 23 March 2012, the African Union announced its intentions to send an international brigade of 5,000 military troops "from Uganda, South Sudan, Central African Republic, and Congo, countries where Kony's reign of terror has been felt over the years ... to join the hunt for rebel leader Joseph Kony and to "neutralize" him. According to the statement, "the mission would commence on 24 March 2012 and the search would last until Kony was caught", after which the task force would be disbanded. The effort is Ugandan-led and backed by the US with the 100 advisers already there, who are offering advice, intelligence and training, along with equipment. The brigade established its headquarters in Yambio, South Sudan, close to the border with the DRC, and was commanded by a Ugandan officer; while, a Congolese officer had oversight of intelligence operations.

On 12 May 2012, Ugandan soldiers with the African Union brigade captured a senior LRA leader in the Central African Republic (CAR), Caesar Achellam, a veteran rebel commander with the rank of Major General. Because he was a leading military strategist for the LRA, Achellam's arrest signified a considerable setback for Joseph Kony's fight to evade capture.

On 6 June, the UN secretary-general, Ban Ki-moon, released an initial report covering the activities of the LRA from 2009 to 2012. The report itself stated that "at least 45 children have been killed and maimed" during this time period and at least "591 children, including 268 girls have been abducted". Though it was noted by Radhika Coomaraswamy, the UN special representative on children and conflict, that the "actual numbers of abductions are much higher, these are just the ones we are aware of". The report also stated that the LRA is currently made up of between 300 and 500 fighters, with around half of them being children.

The LRA was reported to be in the East CAR town of Djema in 2012 but forces pursuing the LRA withdrew in April 2013 after the government of the CAR was overthrown by the Séléka Coalition rebels. In November 2013, Kony was reported to be in poor health in the East CAR town of Nzoka and Michel Djotodia, president of the CAR, claimed he was negotiating with Kony to surrender. US officials doubted that Kony genuinely wanted to surrender.

In early November 2013, suspected LRA militants attacked five villages in the Western Equatoria region of South Sudan. Three people were killed and one wounded, aside from looting the rebels also set fire to several houses.

On 4 December 2013, 13 LRA militants including senior commander Samuel Kangu were killed in the aftermath of a UPDF ambush in CAR. The rebels were reportedly tracked with the aid of US-provided intelligence.

On 11 December 2013, 19 LRA guerrillas surrendered to African Union troops in Zembio, CAR.

According to UN estimates, at least 65 LRA attacks took place in CAR and DRC during the first quarter of 2014 during which 93 people were reportedly abducted and two killed.

On 7 May 2014, United Nations secretary-general Ban Ki-moon stated that senior LRA commanders were stationed in South Sudan's border areas with Sudan and the Central African Republic.

On 20 May 2014, delegates from Uganda, DRC, South Sudan and CAR held a three-day conference in South Sudan regarding the LRA insurgency.

On 13 August 2014, LRA insurgents launched attacks on villages in the vicinity of Billi, DRC, killing 4 people and injuring 2. FARDC troops clashed with the militants before the latter retreated.

On 23 August 2014, 13 LRA hostages escaped from captivity, six days later 12 more hostages followed suit. The escapees were abducted between 2004 and August 2014, and managed to reach Digba and Ango, DRC, respectively, following a FARDC offensive.

Between 28 and 31 December 2014, LRA perpetrated three attacks in the area of Dungu, DRC. Two people were wounded in the aftermath of an attack on Faradje, the village of Mangasaba was looted, and a merchant from Kiliwa was also robbed by the guerrillas.

On 9 January 2015, LRA's second in command Dominic Ongwen surrendered to US troops stationed in CAR. He claimed to have defected from the Ugandan rebellion. U.S. State Department spokeswoman Jennifer Psaki commented saying, " his defection would be a historic blow to the LRA's command structure."

On 15 January 2015, LRA rebels conducted a number of kidnappings in the villages of Bulumasi and Pangali, Bondo territory, DRC. A total of 10 people were taken hostage during the incident.

On 21 January 2015, LRA militants killed three FARDC soldiers in the aftermath of an ambush conducted at the town of Nangume in the vicinity of Wando, DRC. Dozens of civilians were wounded, three were abducted and two hundred families were also displaced from the area following raids by LRA militants.

On 5 February 2015, a band of twenty suspected LRA guerrillas abducted eight people and engaged in looting in the villages of Dizaga and Digba, DRC.

On 16 February 2015, LRA guerrillas killed three people and injured four others, on Road IV, located in the Dungu territory, DRC.

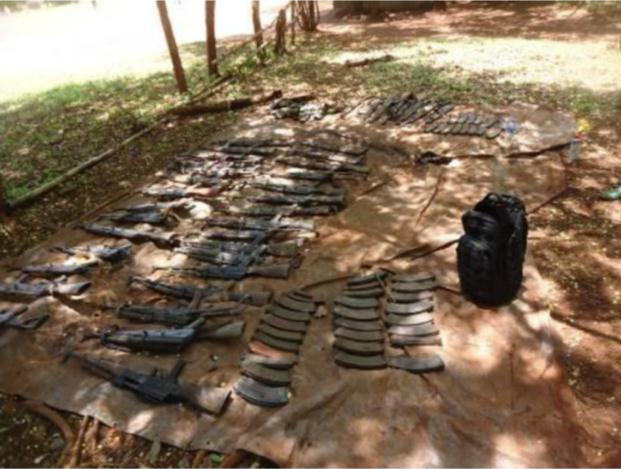
Weapons and ammunition surrendered by LRA defectors in Obo, September 2015

On 12 April 2015, a total of 8 FARDC soldiers went missing in action, following a LRA ambush outside the Mangbangu village, DRC. An unidentified corpse was found in the area, a day after the incident.

On 30 March 2017, the United States military announced that it was ending its anti-LRA campaign, Operation Observant Compass.

On an unspecified date in April 2017, a United States special forces soldier shot and killed an LRA fighter who drew a weapon on the American. The American had been escorting an African Union peacekeeper when the incident occurred.

On 19 April 2017, Uganda announced that it would begin withdrawing forces from the Central African Republic where it had been trying to hunt down Joseph Kony in the country for nine years.

On 6 May 2021, LRA commander Dominic Ongwen was sentenced to 25 years in Ugandan prison over war crimes and crimes against humanity in Uganda.

On 7 April 2024 Russian mercenaries from the Wagner Group conducted an operation in the Haute-Kotto prefecture near the town of Sam Ouandja to apprehend the leader of the Lord's Resistance Army, Joseph Kony. While managing to kill some fighters, the operation failed to find the group leader due to him earlier leaving for another base.

Between June and September 2026, 26 incidents in the southeast of the Central African Republic were attributed to the LRA, including rape, sexual slavery, and the abduction of children.

== Impact ==
War violence experienced by abductees
Witnessed a killing	78%
Tied or locked up	68%
Severely beaten	63%
Forced to steal or destroy property	58%
Forced to abuse corpses	23%
Forced to attack a stranger	22%
Forced to kill a stranger	20%
Forced to kill an enemy soldier in battle	15%
Forced to attack a relative or friend	14%
Forced to kill a relative or friend	8%

The insurgency was historically confined to the region known as Acholiland, consisting of the districts of Kitgum, Gulu, and Pader, though since 2002 violence has overflowed into other Ugandan districts. The LRA also operated across the porous border region with Southern Sudan and most recently into the north-eastern Ituri Province of the Democratic Republic of the Congo. The plight of the affected people has received little media coverage in the developed world. Not until April 2004 did the UN Security Council issue a formal condemnation. A 2005 poll of humanitarian professionals, media personalities, academics and activists identified the conflict in the north of Uganda as the second worst "forgotten" humanitarian emergency in the world, after the conflicts of the neighbouring DRC.

The US government estimates that up to 12,000 people have been killed in the violence, with many more dying from disease and malnutrition as a direct result of the conflict. Nearly two million civilians have been forced to flee their homes, living in internally displaced person (IDP) camps and within the safety of larger settlements, sleeping on street corners and in other public spaces. The problems of the camps have been expatiated by the government ordering villagers into the camps on pain of being classified as rebels and on occasion shelling those villages who refused to relocate.

The insurgency had a severe humanitarian impact in northern Uganda and surrounding areas. A 2006 United States Congressional Record stated that the conflict had resulted in the deaths of approximately 200,000 people from violence and disease.

While many are taken to carry items looted from raided villages, some are also used as soldiers and sex slaves. The group performs abductions primarily from the Acholi people, who have borne the brunt of the 18-year LRA campaign. The United Nations estimated in the mid-2000s that around 25,000 children have been kidnapped by the LRA since 1987. However, several pieces of research have concluded that the figure was significantly higher. In June 2007, UC Berkeley's Human Rights Center researchers worked with reception centers in northern Uganda to compile a database of 25,000 former abductees that went through reception centers.

By triangulating data from different sources on the number of former abductees, the research conservatively estimates that the LRA has abducted 24,000 to 38,000 children and 28,000 to 37,000 adults as of April 2006. The research further found that while women represented only about a third of all the abductees, they tended to stay longer with the LRA compared to men. Women are forced to serve as sexual and domestic servants. According to a survey of 750 youth in Kitgum and Pader, at least 66,000 youth between the ages of 13 and 30 have been abducted. One-third of all boys and one-sixth of all girls had been taken for at least one day.

Of these, 66% of males were taken for longer than two weeks, while the equivalent number for females was 46%. If a female was gone for more than two weeks, there was a one in four chance that she had not returned. Males were again found to be taken for longer periods of time on average, with two in five males that were abducted for more than two weeks not having returned. The number of abductions was greatest in 2002 and 2003, perhaps in retaliation for Operation Iron Fist. However, the average age of abductees has risen from about 13 in 1994 to nearly 18 in 2004, coinciding with the rise in number, and fall in length, of abductions.

While the LRA now appears to consist of less than two thousand combatants that are under intense pressure from the Ugandan military, the government has been unable to end the insurgency to date. Ongoing peace negotiations are complicated by an investigation and trial preparation by the International Criminal Court. Meanwhile, military operation is going on. The conflict continues to slow down Uganda's development efforts, costing the poor country's economy a cumulative total of at least $1.33 billion, which is equivalent to 3% of GDP, or $100 million annually.

=== "Night commuters" ===
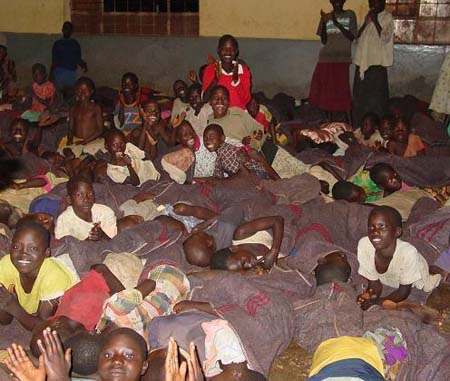
A room of child "night commuters"

At the height of the conflict, each night, as many as 40,000 children between the ages of 8 and 14, referred to as "night commuters" or "night dwellers", would walk up to 20 kilometres (12 mi) from IDP camps to larger towns, especially Gulu, in search of safety and to avoid abduction by the LRA. Refuge was offered at churches, hospitals, bus stations and temporary shelters before the children returned home again each morning. Because of this phenomenon, religious leaders from different denominations staged a one-week solidarity demonstration by sleeping in the streets with the children, which generated further attention of the conflict from the world.

=== Awareness ===
Initiatives to raise international awareness for these children included the "GuluWalk" and the work of the Resolve Uganda. Night commuters are also the subject of documentaries such as Stolen Children, War/Dance, and Invisible Children.

The Invisible Children documentary sponsored the Global Night Commute, an event similar to GuluWalk. On 29 April 2006, over 80,000 youths from around the world converged on urban centers in 130 major cities around the world in solidarity with displaced Ugandan children. The Invisible Children organization also raised awareness for those in the Internally Displaced Camps (IDPs) through its "Displace Me" event held in 15 cities across the US on 28 April 2007. Over 68,000 people participated in the event which required participants to sleep outside in "homes" made out of cardboard, similar to those in the IDPs.

Another program, The Name Campaign, asks people to wear nameplate necklaces imprinted with the first name of one of the thousands of abducted children as a means of raising public awareness.

Danny Glover and Don Cheadle have both been vocal advocates on behalf of the children of Northern Uganda.

On 5 March 2012, the Invisible Children organization posted the Kony 2012 video on YouTube which was widely seen. As of 22 March 2023, the film had over 103 million views on video-sharing website YouTube.

== See also ==
- List of ongoing military conflicts
- List of conflicts in Africa
- Child soldiers in Africa

== Sources ==
- Allen, Tim."Trial Justice: The International Criminal Court and the Lord's Resistance Army", African Arguments Series, Zed Books, London, 2006. ISBN 1-84277-737-8
- Behrend, H. (M. Cohen, trans.) Alice Lakwena and the Holy Spirits: War in Northern Uganda, 1985–97, James Currey, 2000. ISBN 0-8214-1311-2. (Originally published as Behrend, H. 1993. Alice und die Geister: Krieg in Norden Uganda. Trickster, Munich.)
  - "War in Northern Uganda: The Holy Spirit Movements of Alice Lakwena, Severino Lukoya and Joseph Kony (1986–1997)", in Clapham, C. ed. African Guerrillas. James Currey, Oxford, 1998.
- De Temmerman, E. Aboke Girls: Children Abducted in Northern Uganda, Fountain, 2001. ISBN 9970-02-256-3. (Originally published as De Temmerman, E. De meisjes van Aboke: Kindsoldaten in Noord-Oeganda. De Kern, 2000. ISBN 90-5312-146-3.)
- Doom, R. and K. Vlassenroot. "Kony's message: a new koine? The Lord's Resistance Army in Northern Uganda", African Affairs 98 (390) 1999: 5 to 36
- Eichstaedt, Peter. First Kill Your Family: Child Soldiers of Uganda and the Lord's Resistance Army. Lawrence Hill Books. 2008. ISBN 978-1-55652-799-9
- Gingyera-Pincywa, A.G. "Is there a Northern Question?" in K. Rupesinghe, ed. Conflict Resolution in Uganda, International Peace Research Institute, Oslo, 1989.
- Jackson, P. "The March of the Lord's Resistance Army: Greed or Grievance in Northern Uganda?" Small Wars and Insurgencies 13, no. 3 (Autumn 2002): 29 to 52.
- Ofcansky, T. "Warfare and Instability Along the Sudan-Uganda Border: A Look at the Twentieth Century" in Spaulding, J. and S. Beswick, eds. White Nile, Black Blood: War, Leadership, and Ethnicity from Khartoum to Kampala. Red Sea Press, Lawrenceville, New Jersey: 195–210, 2000.
- Pham PN, Vinck P, Stover E. "The Lord's Resistance Army and Forced Conscription in Northern Uganda.", Human Rights Quarterly 30:404–411, 2008
- Vinck P, Pham PN, Weinstein HM, Stover E. Exposure to War Crimes and its Implications for Peace Building in Northern Uganda. Journal of the American Medical Association (JAMA) 298 (5): 543–554, 2007
- Ward, K. "'The Armies of the Lord': Christianity, Rebels and the State in Northern Uganda, 1986–1999", Journal of Religion in Africa 31 (2), 2001.
- AL JAZEERA AND NEWS AGENCIES "LRA commander Dominic Ongwen sentenced to 25 years in prison" Al Jazeera news | Lords Resistance Army
- UNITED STATES CONGRESS "Congressional Record" Congressional Record | Lord's Resistance Army
