= Caesar Achellam =

Ugandan LRA general (born 1963)

Ceaser Achellam
- Born: Possibly 1963 (aged 61); Likely Uganda
- Years active: 1980–2012

Caesar Achellam (claims to be born in 1963) is a former major general in the Lord's Resistance Army until his capture in 2012.

== Affiliation with the LRA ==
Achellam joined the LRA voluntarily in the late 1980s after fighting for the Uganda People's Democratic Army (UPDA), a rebel group in northern Uganda that preceded the LRA. He had formal military training and periodically served as an instructor in military training drills for LRA combatants. Achellam spoke Arabic, a skill he used to help manage the LRA’s strategic relationship with the Sudanese government in Khartoum.

Before Achellam's capture, his relationship to Joseph Kony was uncertain. For years, Achellam's group operated in close proximity to Kony's group, but Kony placed Achellam under house arrest in mid-2007 because of his opposition to seriously engaging the Juba peace negotiations. Achellam had instead urged Kony to reconnect with the Sudanese military officers in South Darfur. Vincent Otti, then Kony's ranking deputy, convinced Kony to pursue the peace talks and openly accused Achellam of having received money from the Sudanese without disclosing it to Kony. However, following Otti's execution in late 2007, Kony exonerated Achellam and reinstated his status as a senior commander.

Achellam was taken into custody by Ugandan military forces near the CAR-Congo border in May 2012.

According to Howard Buffett in his 40 Chances book, he met Achellam. Achellam according to him, has hunted children to convert them into child soldiers and sex slaves under Joseph Kony.

== See also ==
- Joseph Kony
- Raska Rukwiya
