= James Obita =

Ugandan politician

James Alfred Obita
- Occupation: Biochemist

James Alfred Obita is a Ugandan politician. By profession, he is an industrial biochemist and serves as the Secretary for External Affairs and Mobilization, as well as the Leader of Delegation for the Lord’s Resistance Army.

== Early life and education. ==
James Obita holds a PhD from the School of Industrial Chemistry, University of New South Wales, Australia.

== See also ==
- Francis Kitaka
- Hakim Sendagire
- Okot Odhiambo
- Justine Odong Latek
- Dominic Ongwen
