= Operation Observant Compass =

Military operation

- Part of Lord's Resistance Army insurgency and War on Terror
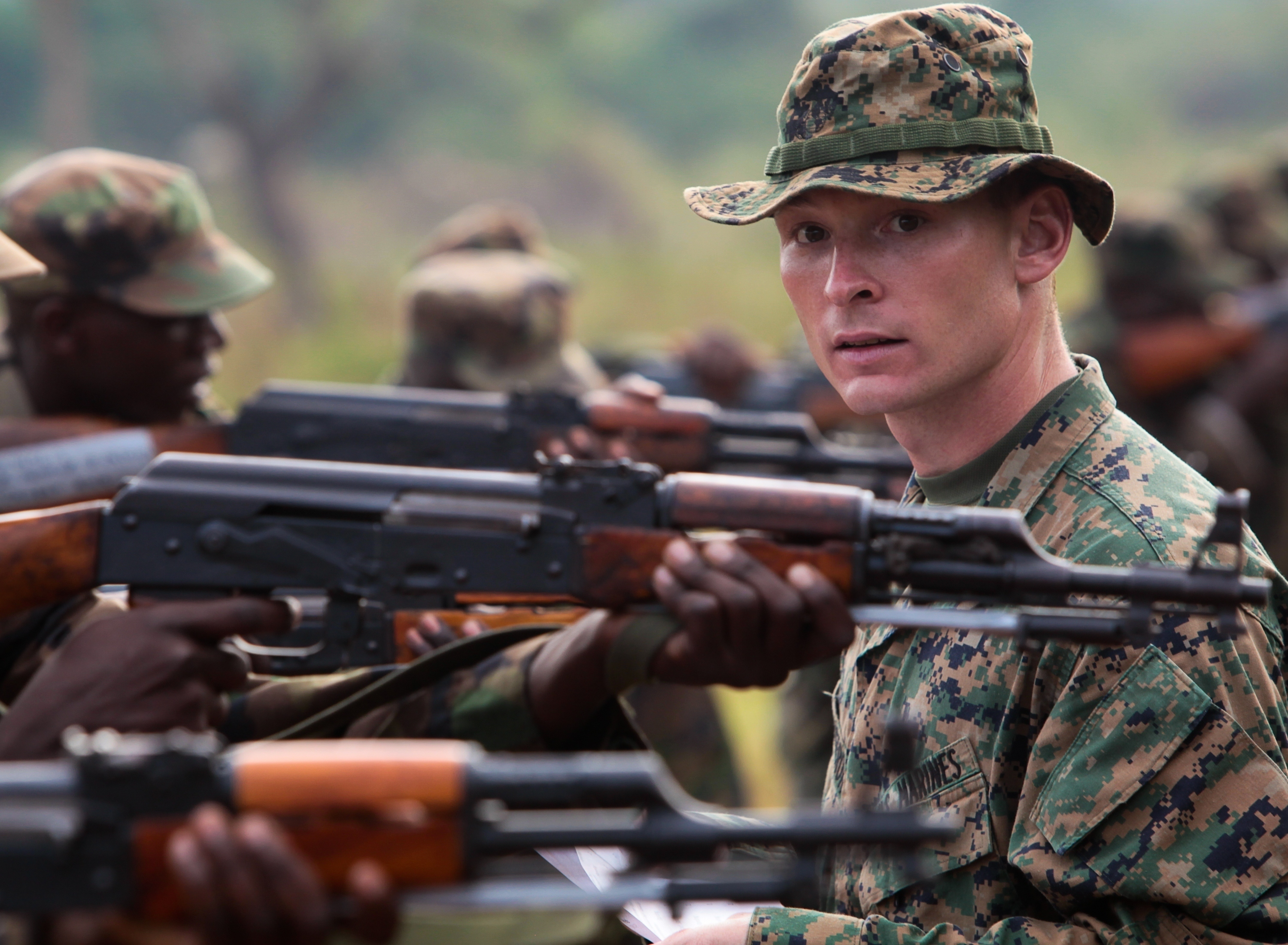
- U.S. Marine Sgt. Joseph Bergeron, a task force combat engineer, explains combat marksmanship tactics to a group of Ugandan soldiers.
Date	2011 – 2017 (6 years)
Location	Uganda, with spillovers in the Democratic Republic of the Congo, South Sudan & the Central African Republic.
Status	American victory: Founder and leader of the LRA Joseph Kony goes into hiding; Senior LRA commander Dominic Ongwen surrenders to American forces in the Central African Republic and is tried at the Hague; Majority of LRA installations and encampments located in South Sudan and Uganda abandoned and dismantled; Small scale LRA activity continues in eastern DR Congo, and the Central African Republic

Belligerents
United States: U.S. Army; U.S. Marine Corps; U.S. Air Force; U.S. Navy; U.S. Africa Command; Uganda; Democratic Republic of the Congo; South Sudan; Central African Republic	Lord's Resistance Army

Commanders and leaders
(United States) Barack Obama (United States) Donald Trump (United States) Robert Gates (United States) Leon Panetta (United States) Chuck Hagel (United States) Ash Carter (United States) Jim Mattis (Uganda) Yoweri Museveni (Democratic Republic of the Congo) Joseph Kabila (South Sudan) Salva Kiir (Central African Republic) François Bozizé (Central African Republic) Michel Djotodia (Central African Republic) Alexandre-Ferdinand Nguendet (Central African Republic) Catherine Samba-Panza (Central African Republic) Nicolas Tiangaye (Central African Republic) Faustin-Archange Touadéra	Joseph Kony

Operation Observant Compass was an American military operation initially focused on apprehending Joseph Kony and the Lord's Resistance Army in Central Africa. It was overseen by United States Africa Command. NBC News wrote in March 2017 that "The area of operations is the size of California, with about 80 military personnel and several dozen support personnel tasked with finding around 150 fighters with Kony's Lord's Resistance Army, operating across portions of four countries in some of the world's most inaccessible terrain."

In 2017, with around $780 million spent on the operation, and Kony still in the field, the United States wound down Observant Compass and shifted its forces elsewhere. But the operation didn't completely disband, according to the Defense Department: “U.S. military forces supporting Operation Observant Compass transitioned to broader scope security and stability activities that continue the success of our African partners."
