= Lamola =

Lamola is a surname. Notable people with the name include:

- Alphonse Lamola (born c. 1971), South Sudanese soldier
- Lerato Lamola (born 1986), South African footballer
- Ronald Lamola (born 1983), South African lawyer and politician
- Vusi Lamola (born 1950), South African footballer
