= Lukodi Massacre =

Attack on the Lukodi Village in Northern Uganda on May 19 2004

- Part of Lord's Resistance Army insurgency (2002–2005)
- Monument commemorating the victims of the Lukodi Massacre. 45 Names of the victims are engraved on the stone.
- Location: Lukodi village, Gulu District, Acholi sub-region, northern Uganda
- Date: May 19, 2004
- Deaths: 60 civillians
- Perpetrator: Lord's Resistance Army

The Lukodi Massacre refers to the Attack on the Lukodi Village in Northern Uganda on May 19 2004 by the Lord's Resistance Army (LRA). The attack killed "over 60 Lukodi residents". The Massacre played a crucial rule in the eventual judicial case against Dominic Onwgen by the International Criminal Court.

== The Massacre ==
At about 6 pm, the IRA had advanced towards Lukodi. Once they had partly surrounded the village, the IRA opened fire. Out of the 38 Home guards that were appointed to guard the village, less than 10 stood to fight back. Once the guards were defeated, the IRA started to massacre the civilian population with no interference. Some civilians were able to find shelter in the nearest IDP camp.

By 9 pm, the Army sent a helicopter to scare off the IRA. By then However, the rebels were gone taking with them an unspecified amount of prisoners. As a result, 60 civilians had been brutally killed with a number of abducted men still not returning.

== Aftermath ==
The Massacre was blamed onto Dominic Onwgen as a commander of the LRA. He was later tried and found guilty by the ICC for 61 crimes committed in Northern Uganda, and sentenced to 25 years in prison.

The ICC ruled that victims of Onwgen's crimes are entitled to compensation. This included the residents of the Lukodi. However, to this day no compensation came to the victims of Lukodi.
