= Child soldiers in Uganda =

Child soldiers in Uganda are members of the Lord's Resistance Army, a rebel group that has been abducting young people since 1987 to fill out their ranks. Children and youth (both boys and girls) are usually abducted from their homes, often with one or more others, and in characteristically violent ways. New abductees are subjected to an intense period of integration and homogenization. Once indoctrinated, recruits are retained by threats of violence, cultivation of an intense in-group identity, and a belief in spiritual monitoring and punishment.

During captivity, abductees are subjected to harsh living conditions, victimization and abuse. Most older males receive military training while females are often assigned as sexual partners to commanders. Almost all abductees witness acts of violence and most are forced to commit atrocities targeting civilians.

Once liberated, former abductees display physical, psychological, and social problems. Many are rejected by their families and communities, and are considered evil and diseased. Traditional beliefs about cen, a kind of malevolent spiritual force or vengeful ghost, contributes to villagers perceiving former abductees as socially polluting and potentially dangerous. However, some families are able to support their children's return to the family and engage in cleansing rituals to help the child reintegrate into the community.

== Origin of child soldiers in Uganda ==
The Lord's Resistance Army is an armed rebel group based in Uganda that has abducted over 67,000 youth and 30,000 children for use as child soldiers and sex slaves since its inception in 1987. The Lord's Resistance Army began as an extension of the Holy Spirit Movement, which was a rebellion against President Museveni's oppression of the Northern region of Uganda in addition to being a religious sect. This movement was led by Alice Lakwena, however when Lakwena fled from Uganda after suffering horrifying defeat in battle in November 1987, her cousin Joseph Kony took her place. In doing so he changed the name of the group to the Lord's Resistance Army. By May 1988 Kony truly established himself as the new leader of the rebel army which consisted of a force of a thousand seasoned fighters. When the LRA began to lose popular support and soldiers, Kony devolved to tactics that have come to characterize the group such as stealing supplies and abducting children in order to have soldiers to fill the ranks.

== The process of recruiting child soldiers ==
In Northern Uganda, the Lord's Resistance Army (LRA) had been relying on forced recruitment at a rate of 90% for over two decades. According to former soldiers, the group had almost no material resources and no one in the organization is paid, but it persists by persuading a good share of the recruited or abducted soldiers to remain as a part of the group. Cleansing or rebirth are emphasized as fundamental to the recruit being inducted into the group. Violence, often committed in a new recruit's home village, makes the possibility of deserting and returning home more difficult. These violent acts work to create an insider vs. outsider identity designing an incentive for those in the group to remain in the group. According to researchers, the strongest mechanism to retain recruits to the LRA is a belief in spiritual monitoring and punishment, which effectively deters desertion. This tactic raises costs of an outside option, while training and an organization structure based on small groups work together with the LRA belief system to create an intense in-group/out-group identity. While they do have some soldiers that desert the LRA, they can retain a significant portion of those forced to join the group. Most former child soldiers in this study were abducted at a young age, mainly from their homes. Half of them were abducted together with one or several relatives. The abductions were conducted violently, especially for males and older children. Not only the abductees were victimized, as many witnessed atrocities against others at the moment of abduction. Once abducted by the LRA, children are told to commit atrocious acts such as being compelled to kill or maim their own family members or other children. In doing so, the LRA uses the ensuing fear of punishment for these acts as a tool to dissuade the children from returning home. The abductees then go through an intense period of integration and homogenization, during which they are trained to wage war and forced to participate in frequent killings.

== Life of a child soldier ==
According to interviews from former child soldiers, life as a child soldier in the LRA in Uganda can vary depending on age and gender. According to sampling from former child soldiers at the Rachele Rehabilitation Center in Uganda, the former child soldiers in this study spent on average 1 1/2 years in captivity, ranging from half a day to 6,009 days. During captivity in the LRA, the former child soldiers in this study were directly exposed to warfare, as all of them reported at least one of the sixteen recorded war-related experiences. Those that survive integration and are able to "prove themselves" are eventually assigned to a variety of positions within the army, including carrying supplies, participating in armed hostilities, or, for girls, watching over other children, or becoming sexual beings for Kony's favored commanders. Nearly all former child soldiers reported living conditions that they were subjected to as being harsh and that they themselves were victimized by violence by other soldiers in the LRA. The harsh living conditions include lack of access to food and water, jobs and income, and medical attention and education. Eighty-eight percent of the sample have also witnessed atrocities against other abductees, civilians, or soldiers, and seventy-six percent admitted to having committed atrocities, most of which were targeting civilians. Sixty-two percent of the child soldiers, who were mostly older males, in this study went through military training, where they learned how to use weapons and organize attacks. Fifty-six percent of females were assigned a rebel soldier as their husband and were subjected to extensive sexual abuse. The study also concluded that the older a child was when captured or the more time they served in the LRA the more likely they were to experience war.

== Life after being a child soldier ==
Interviews with former child soldiers show that thousands of former abductees were plagued by physical, psychological, and social problems. Many were rejected by their families, villages, and the community at large because of what they had done and been forced to become. They were tainted, damaged, and many feared they brought an evil with them out of the bush that would infect the community. These same victims of the LRA abductions again became victims in the communities they returned to. They were labeled as child soldiers from the LRA and treated as if they were diseased. Most liberated child soldiers were sent back into society by means of reception centers—largely triggered by the visit to the area by the UN Secretary General for Humanitarian Affairs in 2003, the referral of the situation to the International Criminal Court in 2004 and the successful publicity campaign launched by Invisible Children the same year. However, in these rehabilitation centers they focused on reintegration by way of cultural reintegration, not taking into account that the families of many of the children were burdened by their returns.

The workers at the reception centers interviewed the children after they returned home and began to realize that within a few weeks or months, the children were having significant problems at home. The children felt that their family members were afraid of them and no longer wanted them. Neighbours were additionally prone to abusing or shunning them. They told workers that their neighbors had been calling them names, including references to where a returned child had spent time and received support. Almost all of the children who were being interviewed reported examples of being stigmatized. The interviewers also said that some of the children felt oppressed by what they knew their neighbours thought about them because many of those who had killed or witnessed terrible events with the LRA continued to be disturbed by their memories.

The community members also raised concerns about cen, a kind of malevolent spiritual force or vengeful ghost. According to African legend, cen is possessed by those that have "witnessed or perpetrated violence, or been in physical contact with a dead body, and is perceived and experienced as socially polluting and potentially dangerous". Fear of cen was often mentioned specifically in connection with the LRA, because of the level of violence that was perpetuated, and those who had spent time in the bush could not have escaped it. Cen was viewed as something that those returning, including children, might bring with them to the home without wanting to do so.

It was also apparent that not all child soldiers had the same experiences. Some parents stated that they were happy to be reunited and were adamant that their children had been taken by force. When this happened, the community accepted the children and sometimes did cleansing rituals on the child. However, only 69 people in the sample (less than 30 percent of those interviewed) stated that they had been involved in any cleansing rites. It was also apparent to the interviewers that, even where families seemed to be welcoming back their loved ones and purportedly viewed them as blameless victims who had suffered, it was known that those who spent time with the LRA were likely to have survived by being willing to witness or to perform atrocious acts. There were those whose detailed accounts of life with the LRA were narrated as if they were entirely passive. However, other children were able to understand the fact that they had to make a choice to survive, and were open to now re-learning how to live in society.
