= UNight =

uNight: For the Children of Uganda is a non-profit organization founded in 2005 to support and advocate for the two million internally displaced victims of the conflict in Northern Uganda. Operating networks in both the US and UK, uNight works with grassroots, faith-based, student and private organizations to promote an immediate, peaceful end to the region's decades-long civil war.

== Positions ==
According to the organization's website, uNight's constituent's work includes efforts to:

Petition the White House to appoint a special envoy for northern Uganda to oversee a successful peace negotiation to end the civil war, the dismantlement of the camps, the resettlement and rehabilitation of the displaced population, and a comprehensive program of reconstruction, youth education, and training, especially for young girls.

Petition Congress to convene a special hearing on the humanitarian crisis in northern Uganda.

Mobilize humanitarian relief, especially medicine, clothing, and school supplies, for the victims of this vicious war.

== Programs ==
The organization promotes awareness of the strife existent among 1.6 million people living at present in over three hundred dangerous and disease-ridden government-run camps in Northern Uganda. It has organized the New York City contingent of "Gulu Walk", a global event, run in approximately 40 cities across the globe to protest atrocities committed by both the Lord's Resistance Army and the Ugandan Army.

uNight is currently developing programs in collaboration with the Acholi Religious Leaders Peace Initiative and local political leaders in the Acholi region to create education programs for the region's night commuters, as well as to provide clothing collected in chapters across the US and UK for distribution to those presently living in the government camps. The organization's longer-term vision in Northern Uganda is for the development of a series of holistic educational centers for youth.

== Chapters ==
- Harvard University, Cambridge, MA
- The Ross School, East Hampton, NY
- University of North Carolina Wilmington (UNCW), NC
- Williams College, Williamstown, MA
- CUNY, New York, NY
- Cardiff University, Wales, Britain
- Lester B. Pearson United World College of the Pacific, British Columbia, Canada
