= Lukwiya =

Lukwiya is a surname. Notable people with the surname include:

- Matthew Lukwiya (1957–2000), Ugandan physician
- Raska Lukwiya (died 2006), Ugandan rebel
