= Kpanga =

Kpanga is a village in the north-east of the Democratic Republic of the Congo, near the borders with the Central African Republic and Southern Sudan. In May 2010 it was reported that a senior United Nations official is investigating a massacre of over 100 people that took place in February 2010. The massacre was carried out by Ugandan rebels from the Lord's Resistance Army.

== See also ==
- List of cities in the Democratic Republic of the Congo
