= Betty Oyella Bigombe =

Ugandan politician (born 1952)

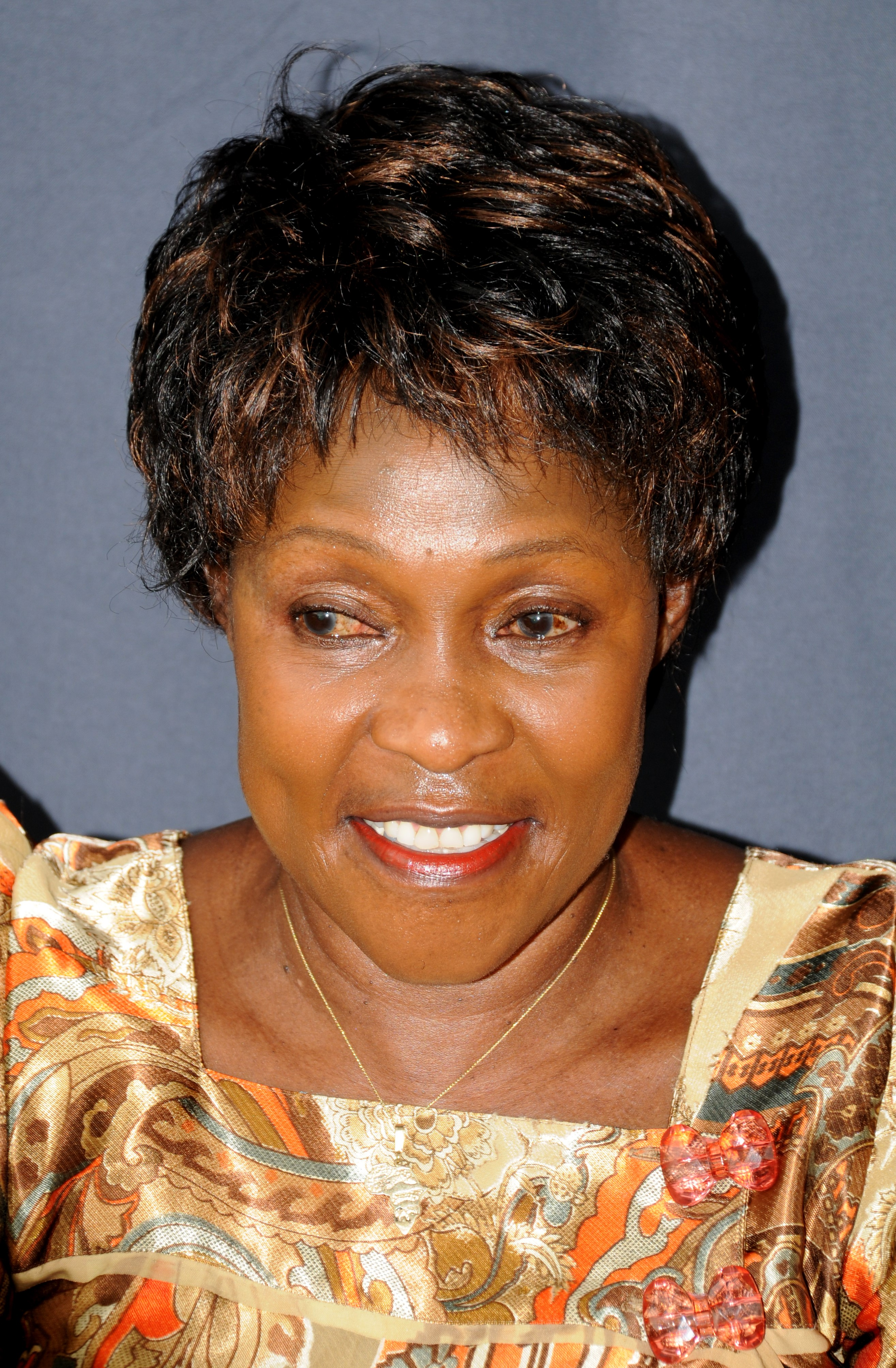
- Born: 21 October 1952 (age 73); Amuru District, Uganda
- Citizenship: Uganda
- Education: Gayaza High School; Trinity College Nabbingo; Makerere University (Bachelor of Arts in Social Science); Harvard Kennedy School at Harvard University (Master of Public Administration); Cambridge, Massachusetts ( Master of Public Administration)
- Occupations: Social Scientist, Public Administrator and Politician
- Years active: 1986 – present
- Known for: Peace Efforts & Politics
- Title: Senior Director; World Bank
- Children: 2

Betty Oyella Bigombe, also known as Betty Atuku Bigombe (born 21 October 1952), is a Ugandan politician who served as the Senior Director for Fragility, Conflict, and Violence at the World Bank from 2014 to 2017. She was appointed in June 2014. From May 2011 until June 2014, she was the State Minister for Water Resources in the Uganda Cabinet. She was appointed on 27 May 2011. She concurrently served as the elected Member of Parliament (MP), representing Amuru District Women's Constituency. She resigned from the two appointments on 1 June 2014.

== Background and education ==
Betty Bigombe was born on 21 October 1952 in Uganda's Amuru District, formally known as Acholi District. She is one of eleven children by her father, who was a nurse. She is an ethnic Acholi. Bigombe attended Gayaza High School for her O-Level studies, graduating in 1968 and Trinity College Nabbingo for her A-Level education, graduating in 1970. She entered Makerere University, Uganda's oldest public university, graduating with the degree of Bachelor of Arts in Social Science, in 1974. Later she attended Harvard Kennedy School at Harvard University, in Cambridge, Massachusetts in the United States. She graduated with the degree of Master of Public Administration. Her studies at Harvard were sponsored by a Fellowship from the Harvard Institute for International Development.

== Career ==
From 1981 until 1984, she worked as the Company Secretary of the Uganda Mining Corporation, a government parastatal company. From 1986 until 1996, she served in the Ugandan Parliament as a Member of Parliament. In 1988, she was appointed State Minister for Northern Uganda, which required her to take up residence in Gulu, the largest city in the Uganda's Northern Region. She was tasked with convincing the Lord's Resistance Army (LRA) guerilla rebels to lay down their arms, following the failure of military efforts to defeat the rebels. Bigombe initiated contact with the LRA leader Joseph Kony in June 1993. In 1993, she was named Uganda's Woman of the Year for her efforts to end the violence. Despite meeting with Kony, the talks collapsed in February 1994. Soon afterward, the insurgency intensified and no significant efforts towards peace would be made for the next decade.

Following a ten-year stint in the Uganda Parliament from 1986 until 1996, she failed to win the parliamentary seat for Gulu Municipality in 1996 and left government service. In 2011, fifteen years later, she bounced back by winning the parliamentary seat of Amuru District Women's Constituency, on the National Resistance Movement party ticket.

In 1997, following her graduation from Harvard, she took up employment with the World Bank in Washington, DC, as a Senior Social Scientist with the Post-Conflict Unit. Later, she served as a Consultant to the Bank's Social Protection and Human Development Unit. In 1999 and 2000, Bigombe provided technical support to the Carter Center in a successful mediation effort between the governments of Uganda and Sudan.

Following the February 2004 Barlonyo massacre, Bigombe took a leave of absence from the World Bank and flew to Uganda to attempt to restart the peace process. From March 2004 to 2005, Bigombe was the chief mediator in a new peace initiative with the Lord's Resistance Army, personally financing much of the logistics of bringing Ugandan government ministers and rebel leaders together. The last meeting on 20 April 2005, fell through. However, the failure of the Bigombe mediation is seen as laying the groundwork for the 2006–2007 Juba talks, which were mediated by the government of South Sudan. Those talks collapsed at the last minute when Joseph Kony refused to sign the peace agreement.

In 2006, she returned to the United States and served as a Senior Fellow at the US Institute of Peace in Washington, D.C. Later, she was appointed a Distinguished African Scholar at the Woodrow Wilson International Center for Scholars, also in Washington, D.C. In 2007, she received the Peacemakers in Action Award from the Tanenbaum Center for Interreligious Understanding.

She was appointed the chairman of the National Information and Technology Authority in Uganda (NITAU) in 2009. In May 2011, she was appointed by President Yoweri Museveni as State Minister for Water Resources, a position that she held until June 2014, when she resigned to take up her assignment at the World Bank. In 2021, she was appointed as Uganda's Ambassador to Malaysia. Additionally, she is a member of the Women Mediators across the Commonwealth, a network comprising women with a keen interest and expertise in mediation. On 29 January 2024, during Makerere University's 74th Graduation Ceremony, she was awarded an Honorary Doctor of Laws Degree, Honoris Causa of Makerere University.

== Other considerations ==
Betty Bigombe was at one time married to Uganda's then ambassador to Japan. She is the mother of two children; Pauline and Emmanuel. In addition to Acholi and English, she speaks Swahili and Japanese.

== See also ==
- Acholiland
- Acholi sub-region
- Cabinet of Uganda
- Lord's Resistance Army Conflict
- Robert Carmona-Borjas
