= Raska Lukwiya =

Ugandan revolutionary

- Died: 12 August 2006
- Military career
- Commands: Lord's Resistance Army

Raska Lukwiya (died on 12 August 2006 in Kitgum district) was the third highest-ranking leader of the Lord's Resistance Army (LRA) rebel group that was founded in northern Uganda. LRA was a rebel group that conducted a long-term insurgency in northern Uganda. He is believed to be a native of Uganda's northern Gulu District.

== Career ==
Lukwiya Raska served successively as Brigade General, Deputy Army Commander and Army Commander of the LRA, the last being the highest LRA rank after those held by Joseph Kony and Vincent Otti.Throughout Lukwiya's career, he held various leadership positions, including Brigade General and others while serving in the LRA.

He was one of five LRA leaders for whom the International Criminal Court issued their first ever warrants in June, 2005. Raska was charged with three counts: one of enslavement constituting a crime against humanity and one count each of ruthless and cruel treatment and attacks on the civilians of northern Uganda constituting war crimes.

== Death ==
He was killed in fighting with the government of Uganda People's Defence Force(UPDF) while peace negotiations brokered by the government of Southern Sudan were still underway.

== See also ==
- James Obita
- Okot Odhiambo
- Justine Odong Latek
- Dominic Ongwen
- Vincent Otti
