= 2008–2009 Garamba offensive =

Attack on the Lord's Resistance Army insurgency

- Part of the Lord's Resistance Army insurgency
Date	14 December 2008 – 15 March 2009 (3 months and 1 day)
Location	North-Eastern DR Congo
Result	Unclear

Belligerents
Uganda; South Sudan; DR Congo	Lord's Resistance Army

Commanders and leaders
(Uganda) Yoweri Museveni	Joseph Kony

Strength
1,300 troops	Unknown

Casualties and losses
Unknown	Estimated 146+ rebels killed

The 2008–2009 Garamba offensive (codenamed Operation Lightning Thunder) started on 14 December 2008, when joint Ugandan, DR Congolese and Southern Sudanese forces launched a botched military attack against the Lord's Resistance Army (LRA) in the Garamba region of DR Congo.

== Background ==
In June 2008, after the LRA had attacked and killed 23 people in Southern Sudan, including 14 soldiers, a Ugandan military spokesman said Uganda, DR Congo and Sudan would launch a joint offensive against the LRA if its leader, Joseph Kony, failed to commit to the Juba peace talks. Concurrently, the Southern Sudanese Information Minister, Gabriel Changson, declared that "The LRA have started war", and that "Southern Sudan will not be the place where they can wage this war". The same month, diplomats reported that the LRA had acquired new weapons and was forcibly recruiting new soldiers, adding 1,000 recruits to the 600 soldiers it already had.

An onslaught against the LRA by Ugandan forces in northern Uganda and across the border in Southern Sudan, led the rebels to relocate to the densely forested Garamba National Park in DR Congo – and when they attacked and killed civilians there, the Congolese government vowed to destroy the LRA.

== The operation ==
In November 2008, the US President George W. Bush personally signed the directive to the United States Africa Command to provide assistance financially and logistically to the Ugandan government during the offensive. The United States military helped in the planning stages of the operation, and also provided financial and technical support in the form of satellite phones and fuel.

On 14 December 2008, a statement announcing the operation was released in the Ugandan capital Kampala by the intelligence chiefs of the armed forces of the three countries: the Armed Forces of the Democratic Republic of Congo, the Uganda People's Defence Force (UPDF) and Sudan People's Liberation Army (SPLA). "The three armed forces successfully attacked the main body and destroyed the main camp of Joseph Kony, code-named Camp Swahili, setting it on fire," the statement said. The Ugandan government stated on 21 December 2008, that 70% of the LRA's camps had been destroyed so far. However it was also reported that these camps were already empty when they were attacked. On 24 December 2008 Uganda said one of its MiG-21 fighter aircraft crashed in the Democratic Republic of Congo. "The pilot, Bosco Opiyo, failed to recover the plane from diving and plunged into the ground, dying instantly, and the craft also caught fire. The accident is purely a technical accident", said Ugandan Army spokesman Paddy Ankunda.

By early January 2009, according to a Congolese official, the LRA was routed, had lost most of its food supply, and was on the run and very close to the border of the Central African Republic, which had reinforced troops at the border. However, other reports indicated that the LRA had split up into smaller units and, in reprisals against the offensive, the LRA attacked civilians they suspected of supporting the operation, raping, mutilating and killing villagers.

== Ugandan withdrawal ==
On 15 March 2009, Uganda abruptly ended its participation in the offensive and began withdrawing its troops from Garamba. The withdrawal, according to Lt. Gen. Ivan Koreta, the Deputy Chief of Defence Forces, was due to an agreement signed with DR Congo. During a handover ceremony in Garamba, the DR Congo Chief of General Staff, Gen. Didier Etumba Longila, said Congo would continue hunting the LRA until they were neutralised although one source described the Congolese army units allocated to the task as poorly trained and underpaid soldiers who often preyed on the villagers they were meant to be protecting. The LRA continued to terrorise areas in the Central African Republic, the Democratic Republic of Congo and Southern Sudan.
