= Atiak massacre =

1995 terrorist incident in Uganda

- Atiak (Uganda)
- Location: 03°15′00″N 32°07′12″E; Atiak, Amuru District, Uganda
- Date: April 20, 1995
- Target: Acholi people
- Deaths: c. 300
- Perpetrator: Lord's Resistance Army
- Defender: Uganda People's Defense Force

The Atiak massacre occurred on April 20, 1995, when a group of estimated 300 Lord's Resistance Army soldiers led by Vincent Otti entered the northern Ugandan town of Atiak, Amuru District. After routing the UPDF and rounding up hundreds of civilians, the LRA announced, "you Acholi have refused to support us. We shall now teach you a lesson." The LRA then handpicked young boys and young girls from the rest, in order to conscript into their ranks and to use as sex slaves, and marched them into the bush. Most of the remaining 200–300 captives were executed by gunfire.

The massacre scuppered the diplomatic relations between the governments of Uganda and Sudan, the LRA's primary sponsor. At the time the two had been in peace talks in Tripoli. Within days of Atiak, Uganda accused Sudan of an aerial bombardment within Uganda and broke off diplomatic relations entirely.
