= Doctor Achaye =

Central African militant

Ali Achaye
- Born: 1990 or 1991 (age 34–35) (Note: He was kidnapped in 1998 while attending second grade of primary school which is compulsory in Uganda from the age of 6); Pabbo
- Other name: Doctor
- Spouse: Two unnamed wives
- Children: Eight unnamed children
- Military career
- Allegiance: Lord's Resistance Army
- Service years: 1998 – 2023

Doctor Achaye (real name Ali Achaye) is a former Ugandan commander of Lord's Resistance Army.

== Life ==
He was born in Pabbo locality in Uganda, possibly from Dog Olinga. He was part of Joseph Kony's security detail for a long time. He was abducted in 1998 in Pabbo centre while in P2 at Agole primary school.

In 2013 he led around 50 fighters.

In late 2014, a group of Ugandan LRA officers, including Dominic Ongwen, began plotting to defect from the LRA. In November 2014, Achaye Doctor, a longtime LRA officer and one of Ongwen's co-conspirators, organized the escape of nine Ugandan fighters, while Ongwen remained in the Kony's group. Achaye's group established a camp in a remote forest region of Bas-Uélé province in northern Democratic Republic of Congo where he operated a splinter group. In 2016 he moved to the Central African Republic where they abducted dozens of civilians.

In early 2021 local authorities initiated trust building measures with Achaye group such as allowing armed group's children to attend local school and fighters to buy at markets. In February 2022 he began formal demobilization talks with authorities and in mid-April and turned in some of group's weapons.

On 22 July 2023 he returned to Uganda together with 13 other LRA fighters.

== Personal life ==
He has two wives, however in 2023 he returned to Uganda with only one wife and seven children, while the other one was left in the Central African Republic just day after delivering.
