= Atiak =

- Municipality
- Location in Uganda
- Coordinates: 03°15′33″N 32°07′23″E
- Country: Uganda
- Region: Northern Region of Uganda
- Sub-region: Acholi sub-region
- District: Amuru
- County: Kilak
- Elevation: 2,790 ft (850 m)

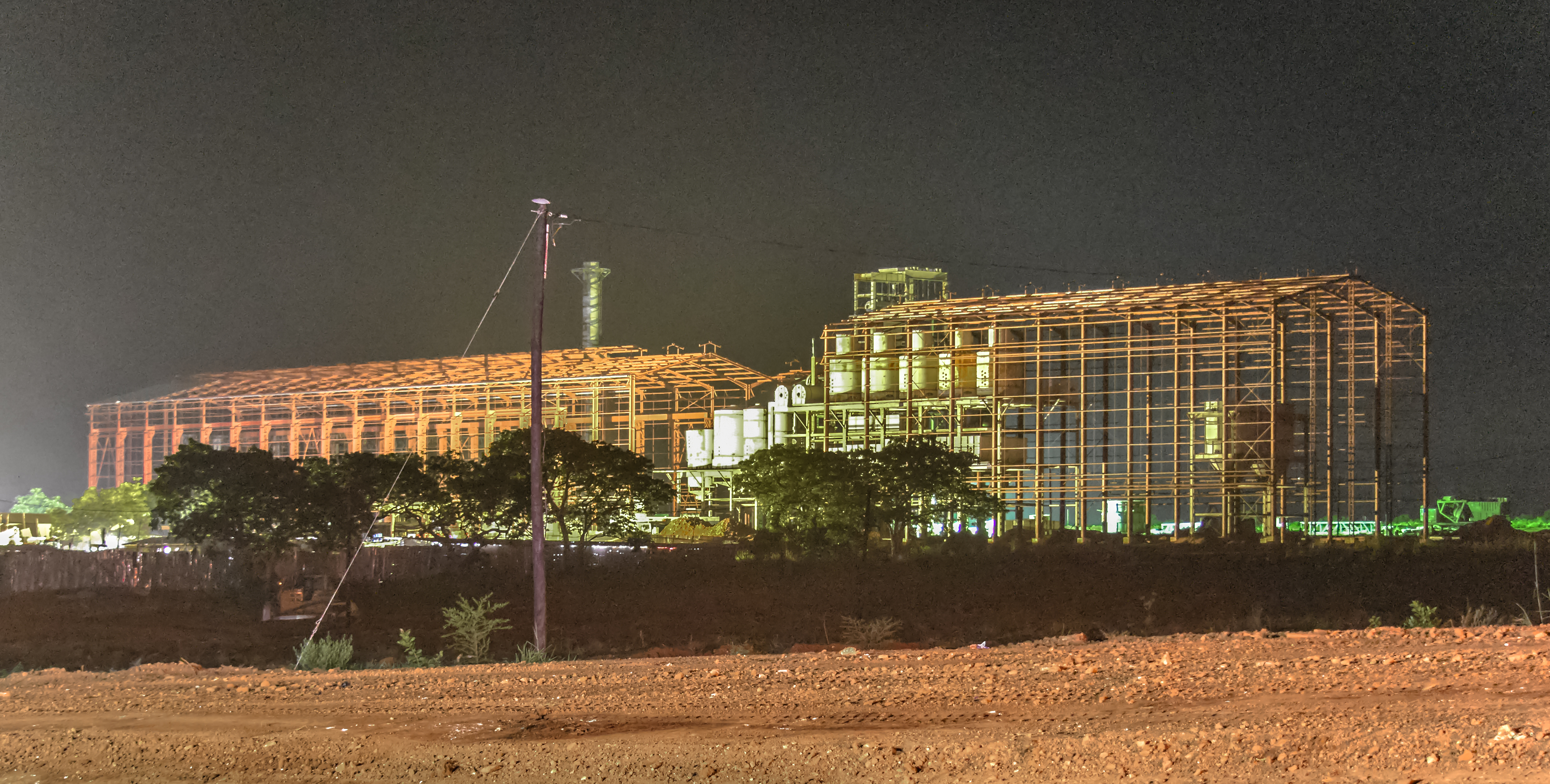
Atiak Sugar Factory.

Atiak is a town in the Northern Region of Uganda on the Gulu-Nimule Road, the primary trade route between Uganda and South Sudan.

== Location ==
Atiak is in Kilak County the Amuru District. It is approximately 71 kilometres (44 mi), by road, north of Gulu, the largest city in the Acholi sub-region. Atiak is approximately 35 kilometres (22 mi) south of the South Sudanese town of Nimule at the international border with Uganda. This is approximately 407 kilometres (253 mi), north of Kampala, Uganda's capital and largest city. The coordinates of the town are 3°15'33.0"N, 32°07'23.0"E (Latitude:3.259167; Longitude:32.123056).

== History ==
Atiak was the site of the 20 April 1995 Atiak massacre in which the Lord's Resistance Army executed an estimated 300 civilian men and abducted juveniles.

== Points of interest ==
The following additional points of interest lie within the town or close to its borders:

- offices of Atiak Town Council
- Atiak central market
- Gulu–Nimule Road, passing through the center of town in a general north/south direction.
- Atiak–Adjumani–Moyo–Afoji Road joins the Gulu–Nimule Road in the middle of town.
- Atyak Chiefdom Headquarters (Ker Kwaro Atyak)
- Tamarind Tree planted by Rwot Olya (1885 to 1923)

== See also ==
- List of cities and towns in Uganda
- List of roads in Uganda
