= Vusi Lamola =

South African soccer player

Personal information
- Full name: Zacharia Vusi Lamola
- Date of birth: 19 March 1950 (age 76)
- Place of birth: Soweto, South Africa
- Position: Midfielder

Youth career
- Germiston City
- Orlando Preston Brothers

Senior career*
| Years | Team | Apps | (Gls) |
| 1971–1980 | Kaizer Chiefs | 246 | (99) |
| 1980 | Edmonton Drillers | 7 | (0) |
| 1980–? | Makwane Computer Stars | | |

International career^{‡}
- SA Black XI
| 1977 | South Africa | | |
- * Club domestic league appearances and goals as of 30 May 2012 ‡ National team caps and goals as of 30 May 2012

Vusi "Computer" Lamola (born 13 March 1950) is a South African former soccer player who played in South Africa for Orlando Preston Brothers, Germiston City and Kaizer Chiefs.

He was nicknamed "Computer" during the 1973 Life Cup final against Orlando Pirates when he replaced Ace Ntsoelengoe in the 80th minute. Trailing 2-0 he set up two goals to send the game to extra time and setup five more to win 7-3. He was named "Computer" for his vision and fast thinking.

He joined Edmonton Drillers in 1980. He played 7 NASL matches and had two assists wearing jersey number 18.

== International career ==
Lamola represented South Africa in 1977 versus Rhodesia.
