= Central African Republic–Congo border =

Central African Republic–Congo border may refer to:

- Central African Republic–Democratic Republic of the Congo border
- Central African Republic–Republic of the Congo border.
