= Alphonse Lamola =

- Born: c. 1971
- Military career
- Allegiance: Lord's Resistance Army
- Rank: Colonel
- Conflicts: Lord's Resistance Army insurgency

Alphonse Lamola (born c. 1971 in Omeri, Gulu District, Northern Uganda) is a soldier in the Lord's Resistance Army of Joseph Kony operating in South Sudan and the Central African Republic.

Lamola was abducted in the mid-1990s, and had by 1999 risen to the rank of Lieutenant in the Army's Meno battalion in South Sudan, under the command of Owor Lakati. He later moved to the Safo battalion under Raska Lukwiya.

After serving as bodyguard to Kony for some time, Lamola rose to become his chief bodyguard when he moved to Garamba National Park in the spring of 2006. Later that year, he was placed in charge of the High Protection Unit (HPU), the main security group overseeing all the units tasked with protecting Kony and his families. He was later replaced by Otto Agweng, and given the leadership of a small unit (one of three composing the external wing of the HPU) tasked with protecting Kony's camp. Lamola was often selected to move with Kony to Nabanga and to establish a security perimeter before Kony's arrival.

Lamola appears to have had a falling-out with Kony in mid-2011 and thereafter placed under the supervision of younger commanders in their twenties, who both protect him and prevent his defection.

As of April 2013, Lamola's group was reportedly operating in the sparsely populated area north of the intersection of the Chinko and Vovodo rivers, in the Mbomou and Haute-Kotto prefectures of the Central African Republic. He reportedly holds the rank of Colonel.

== Actions after 2014 ==
It is believed that Lamola is operating in the Northern DRC as of 2016. On September 5, 2016, Lamola released four women and three children who had been held in long-term captivity by the LRA.
