= Holy Spirit Movement =

Ugandan militant religious group

Holy Spirit Mobile Force
- Leaders: Alice Lakwena (1986-1987); Philip Ojuk; Severino Lukoya (1987-1988)
- Founded: 1986
- Dates active: 1986 – 1988
- Split to: Lord's Resistance Army
- Headquarters: Opit
- Active regions: Northern Uganda
- Ideology: Christian Millenarianism

The Holy Spirit Movement (HSM) was a Ugandan religiously syncretic Christian militant rebel organization centered upon its founder, self-declared spirit medium and prophetess Alice Lakwena (Auma). Alice, an ethnic Acholi, was purportedly directed to form the HSM by Lakwena, one of her spirits, in August 1986. The movement grew to adopt a military wing and waged a major but short-lived rebellion as part of the insurgency (1986–1994). It may have inspired Joseph Kony to begin his Lord's Resistance Army.

Technically, the Holy Spirit Movement was the political wing of Alice's organization and the Holy Spirit Mobile Force (HSMF) was the military wing, but there was no real separation of functions and the titles were used interchangeably.

== Growth ==
The Holy Spirit Movement's approximate area of operation (shaded blue), and its later march into the south (blue arrows) in 1987

Following the collapse of Tito Okello's Uganda National Liberation Army (UNLA), several soldiers left to create a separatist guerilla movement headed by Odong Latek, the Uganda People's Democratic Army. This army fought for Acholi supremacy over regions historically belonging to the ethnic group.

In 1986, Holy Spirit Movement founder Alice Lakwena (at the age of 27) and her supporters were given weapons by former UNLA officers. She thus began commanding her own troops, which she called the Holy Spirit Battalion, one of four rebel groups seeking to gain control over the Gulu and Kitgum districts of Uganda. The Holy Spirit Battalion and the UPDA held a steady alliance until the Battle of Corner Kilak yielded a more contentious relationship. After an independent UPDA attack on Gulu on 20 April 1987, UPDA soldiers grew fearful of the Holy Spirit Battalion, leading to many defecting and joining Lakwena.

Independently in April 1987, another 'spiritual medium', Joseph Kony, held a Holy Spirit Army of his own, consisting of over 5,000 men, including defectors from the UPDA's Black Battalion. While Kony and his Holy Spirit Army was not affiliated with Lakwena and her Holy Spirit Battalion, the former was joined by Lakwena's father, Severino Lukwoya.

Lakwena launched an offensive in Southern Uganda in August 1987, as her numbers grew stronger and stronger. Lakwena was known to recruit disillusioned professional soldiers from the UDPA, and coerce young men from local villages to join her by killing their family members. After fighting a fairly successful campaign in Uganda, Lakwena and 118 followers crossed the Kenyan border, and were arrested as illegal immigrants, on 26 December 1987.

After Lakwena's arrest and detention in Kenya, several former rebels again took up arms and formed what was known as 'Lakwena Part Two'. 'Lakwena Part Two' was less of a unified rebel movement, and more broadly encompassed different rebel groups that operated under a spiritual medium. These mediums never engaged in physical combat, but were instead more influential in strategizing and creating the belief system of their armies.

== Beliefs ==
Alice Lakwena felt she was connected to the spiritual world, and could become possessed by spirits.

Alice was a spiritual medium and healer in her town of Gulu, which was a common role for women to hold. However, Alice claimed to be a nebi, which is the Swahili word for 'prophet' instead of ajwaka, the Swahili word for a normal medium. Alice followed Catholicism, but it is widely unknown if she converted because her spirits instructed her to, or if she converted before becoming 'possessed'.

Alice claimed to become possessed by spirits in either January or May 1985. According to reports, she grew numb and disappeared into the bush, where she claims she spent 40 days and 40 nights living off of the wilderness. She also claimed to be possessed by several ghosts, including a North Korean, Miriam, and Medina. Her 'chief spirit' was the one that communicated God's word directly to her. The 'chief spirit' was an Italian man who had died by drowning in the Nile at the age of 95; he was called 'Lakwena' which means 'the messenger' in the Acholi language.

Her main reason for violent war efforts was to 'purify the aggrieved Northern Acholi people'. Lakwena was repeatedly cited as telling Alice to cleanse tribes of their sins, and to eradicate "bad people", both within her ranks and outside of them. The men that fought for her were fully convinced they were fighting for God and proper judgement, not against an enemy. As such, she convinced her followers to take up arms against the National Resistance Army (NRA) under Yoweri Museveni and restore Acholi purity and supremacy. This goal slowly began to become more universal as time progressed, with Alice modifying her goals for Acholi purity to aim more for total African and global purity.

Rules for Alice's Holy Spirit Battalion (called Holy Spirit Safety Precautions) were biblical in format and unusual in content. Things such as sexual intercourse, alcohol consumption, tobacco usage, and certain foods were prohibited. It was also prohibited for followers to be angry, to eat food cooked in a saucepan, to have more or less than two testicles, to eat with people not anointed with oils, and to kill snakes. Oftentimes, soldiers would receive odd instructions, like reciting mantra-like phrases on the front lines before proceeding into battle, and sprinkling themselves with water before drinking after a battle. After being recruited as a follower, Alice would cleanse a person of their past sins, by placing her hands on their head. This signified her role as a spiritual elder of sorts.

In terms of weaponry, Alice Lakwena convinced her soldier followers that she gave them special weaponry that was enhanced by spiritual powers. For example, she told soldiers that rocks she gave them would turn into grenades when thrown, and if they drank water that had been blessed, then they would be immune to gunfire, as any bullets that they came into contact with would immediately turn into water. Alice also created charms and potions with snake-bone and beeswax that followers were told would turn into swarms of animals and insects when thrown at enemy troops.

The media (western and local) played a role in reporting about Alice's Holy Spirit Movement. This caused her to create a branch of the movement called the Department of Information and Publicity. This bureaucratic organization worked to create a softer image of the brutal practices of the HSM. Alice and Lakwena also gave an interview in October 1987 to try to clear the air about their motives and goals in fighting.
