= Alice Auma =

Ugandan Acholi spirit medium and revolutionary (1956–2007)

Heike Behrend – Alice Lakwena and the Holy Spirits. War in Northern Uganda 1986–97

Alice Auma (1956 – 17 January 2007) was a Ugandan spirit medium who, as the head of the Holy Spirit Movement (HSM), led a millennial rebellion against the government forces of President Yoweri Museveni from August 1986 until November 1987. The primary spirit she purportedly channelled was that of a dead army officer called Lakwena, meaning "messenger", who those from the Acholi ethnic group believe to be a manifestation of the Christian Holy Spirit. The combined persona of Alice Auma channelling the spirit Lakwena is often referred to as "Alice Lakwena". Auma's HSM was ultimately defeated in November 1987.

== Biography ==
=== Early life ===
Alice Auma was born in 1956, the daughter of Severino Lukoya, a self-proclaimed prophet and the founder of the Jerusalem Melter Church in Gulu, Uganda. The leader of the Lord's Resistance Army, Joseph Kony, previously claimed that he and Auma were cousins, though this seems to have been a ploy to garner support from her constituents. Auma herself always distanced herself from Kony and his views.

=== Mediumship ===
Remaining childless after two marriages, Auma moved away from her hometown. She eventually converted to Christianity, but, on 25 May 1985, she reportedly went insane, unable to either hear or speak, later claiming to have been possessed by the spirit Lakwena. Her father took her to eleven different witches, but none alleviated her condition. Auma claimed Lakwena then guided her to Murchison Falls National Park, where she disappeared for 40 days and returned a spirit medium, a traditional ethnic religious role.

Before the defeat of Tito Okello in the Ugandan Bush War, Auma was one of many spirit mediums working near the town of Gulu as a minor oracle and spiritual healer. She worked in the midst of the chaos of the anti-National Resistance Army (NRA) insurgency of the Uganda People's Democratic Army and the increasingly brutal counter-insurgency operations and tactics of the NRA. Later legend holds that on 6 August 1986, Lakwena ordered Auma to stop her work as a diviner and healer, which was pointless in the midst of war, and create the Holy Spirit Movement (HSM) to fight evil and end the bloodshed. This divine mission required the retaking of the capital of Kampala. Thus, the Acholi would redeem themselves from the violence they had collectively imposed on the civilians of the Luwero triangle and initiate a paradise on earth. A letter to local missionaries explained the transition:

The good Lord who had sent the Lakwena decided to change his work from that of a doctor to that of a military commander for one simple reason: it is useless to cure a man today only that he be killed the next. So it became an obligation on his part to stop the bloodshed before continuing his work as a doctor.Auma claimed that Lakwena required that she be possessed by numerous other spirits to achieve its goals. This was unusual in Acholi spirit behaviour.

At this time, there was a perceived spiritual crisis in the area, coinciding with the threat posed by soldiers from the NRA-led government. The increased level of societal tension and number of deaths were attributed to witchcraft.

After a series of victories, Auma led the HSM south out of the Acholi heartland of northern Uganda towards Kampala. There, she garnered much support from other ethnic groups who had grievances with Yoweri Museveni's government. However, subsequent military setbacks suffered by the HSM prompted some followers to accuse Auma of being a witch and of using spirits for destructive ends. As the HSM suffered its final defeat under artillery fire in the forests near Kampala, Auma fled and claimed that Lakwena had left her.

=== Later life and death ===
Auma lived in the Ifo refugee camp near Dadaab in northern Kenya for the remainder of her life. She claimed to have discovered a cure for HIV/AIDS and to have the ability to cure blindness and deafness. In 2004, the government of Uganda offered to repatriate her, which she refused. Auma died on 17 January 2007, after having been sick for about a week with an unknown illness.

== In media ==
In her book Alice Lakwena and the Holy Spirits. War in Northern Uganda 1986–97, the German social anthropologist Heike Behrend analysed Auma's life and the history of the Lord's Resistance Army in Uganda from anthropological perspectives.
