= Lord's Resistance Army =

Christian extremist organization in Africa

- The coat of arms of the LRA in 2006, drawn by Vincent Otti. For details on the logo, see below.
- Leaders: Joseph Kony (believed to be in hiding in Darfur or Central African Republic); Vincent Otti (executed); Caesar Achellam (POW); Raska Lukwiya †; Okot Odhiambo †; Dominic Ongwen (POW); Odong Latek †; Alphonse Lamola; Nixman Oryanga †; Doctor Achaye (surrendered)
- Dates active: 1987–present
- Headquarters: Believed to be South Sudan or Central African Republic (2014)
- Active regions: Uganda; South Sudan; Sudan; Democratic Republic of the Congo; Central African Republic
- Ideology: Acholi nationalism Christian fundamentalism Dominion theology
- Size: 500−3,000 (2007); 300–400 (2011); 100 (2017); 200−1,000 (2022); 71 (2024) (excluding women and children)
- Wars: Lord's Resistance Army insurgency; Second Congo War; Second Sudanese Civil War

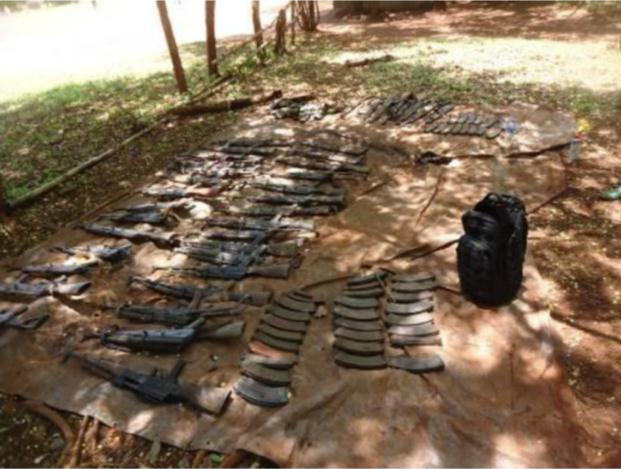
LRA weapons taken by the United Nations

The Lord's Resistance Army (LRA) is a Christian extremist and Acholi nationalist organization operating in Central and East Africa. Its origins were in the Ugandan insurgency (1986–1994) against Yoweri Museveni, during which Joseph Kony founded the LRA in 1987. The group relied heavily on the abduction of pre-teens to fill its ranks, utilizing child soldiers as both frontline combatants and forced porters.

The group is active in northern Uganda, South Sudan, Sudan, the Central African Republic, and the Democratic Republic of the Congo. Its stated goal is the fight against internal oppression under successive regimes, notably Uganda's President Museveni's. Movements like the LRA have articulated demands that include President Museveni's immediate resignation, the dissolution of the National Resistance Army (NRA) and Uganda People's Defence Force (UPDF), and the establishment of an independent government reflecting ethnic diversity and democratic principles. The LRA exhibits a syncretic blend of Christianity, traditional African spiritualism, and other religious elements. This complex combination reflects influences from Acholi culture and African mysticism.

This struggle has exacted a heavy humanitarian toll, with widespread displacement, loss of life, and atrocities against civilians, devastating northern Uganda, particularly Acholiland. Despite allegations of brutality, groups like the LRA seek international recognition, framing their actions as self-defense and resistance against government injustices. The conflict has also profoundly impacted Acholi society, disrupting education, fracturing traditional family structures, and precipitating forced migration, contributing to a cultural erosion. Amid complex geopolitical dynamics and international scrutiny, these groups wish to move toward a future marked by stability and autonomy within a multi-party democracy in a new Ugandan state bound by the Ten Commandments.

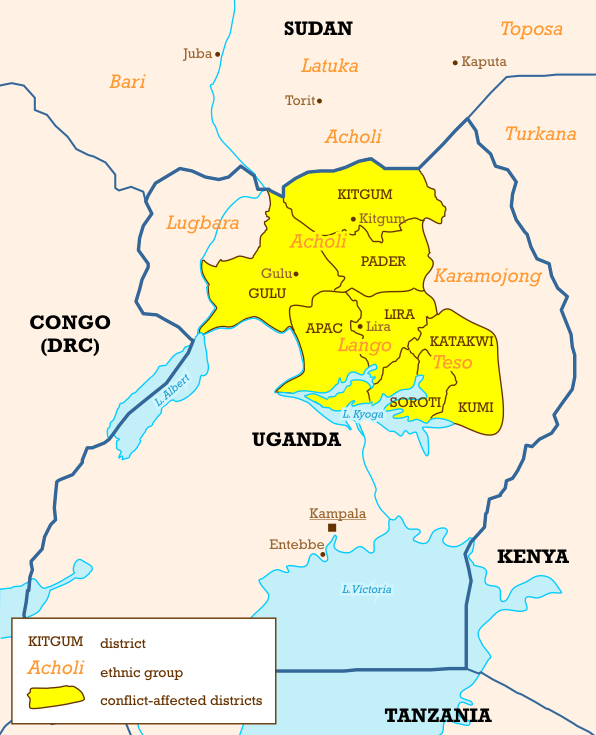
Ugandan districts affected by the Lords Resistance Army

In 2001, the LRA was listed as a terrorist group by the United States, but it has since been removed from the list of designated active terrorist groups. It has been accused of widespread human rights violations, including murder, abduction, mutilation, child sex slavery, and recruitment of child soldiers.

== History ==
Uganda's north and south are politically divided. The south and east are largely inhabited by Bantu-speakers, such as the Baganda people, who were historically agriculturists. Uganda's north is largely inhabited by the Nilotic-speaking Acholi, who had engaged in hunting, farming, and livestock herding in the past. The ethnic and cultural tensions within Uganda grew with time following the creation of the Protectorate of Uganda in 1894. While the agricultural Baganda people worked closely with the British, the Acholi and other northern ethnic groups supplied much of the national manual labor and came to comprise a majority of the military.

The southern region became the center of commercial development. The livestock-raising Acholi from the north of Uganda were resented for dominating the army and police. Following the country's independence in 1962, Uganda's ethnic groups continued to compete with each other within the bounds of Uganda's new political system.

=== 1986–2000 ===
In 1986, the armed rebellion led by Yoweri Museveni's NRA won the Ugandan Bush War and took control of the country. The victors sought vengeance against ethnic groups in the North of Uganda. Their activities included Operation Simsim, which engaged in burning, looting, and killings of locals.

Such acts of violence led to the formation of rebel groups from the ranks of the previous Ugandan army, the Uganda National Liberation Army. Many of those groups made peace with Museveni. The southern-dominated army, however, did not stop attacking civilians in the north of the country. Therefore, by late 1987 to early 1988, a civilian resistance movement led by Alice Auma was formed.

Auma did not pick up arms against the central government; her members carried sticks and stones. She believed she was inspired by the Holy Spirit, portraying herself as a prophet who received messages from the Holy Spirit, and expressed the belief that the Acholi could defeat the Museveni government. She preached that her followers should cover their bodies with shea nut oil as protection from bullets, never take cover or retreat in battle, and never kill snakes or bees.

Joseph Kony would later preach a similar superstition, encouraging soldiers to use oil to draw a cross on their chest as protection from bullets. During a later interview, however, Auma distanced herself from Kony, claiming that the Holy Spirit did not want soldiers to kill civilians or prisoners of war.

Kony sought to align himself with Auma and, in turn, garner support from her constituents, even going so far as to claim they were cousins. Meanwhile, he gained a reputation as having been possessed by spirits and became a spiritual figure or a medium. He and a small group of followers first moved beyond his home village of Odek on 1 April 1987. A few days later, he met a group of former Uganda National Liberation Front soldiers from the Black Battalion whom he managed to recruit. They then launched a raid on the city of Gulu.

By August 1987, Auma's Holy Spirit Mobile Force scored several victories on the battlefield and began a march toward the capital, Kampala. In 1988, after the Holy Spirit Movement was decisively defeated in the Jinja District and Auma fled to Kenya, Kony seized the opportunity to recruit the Holy Spirit remnants. The LRA occasionally carried out local attacks to underline the inability of the government to protect the population. The fact that most NRA government forces, in particular former members of the Federal Democratic Movement (FEDEMO), were known for their lack of discipline and brutality meant that the civilian population was accused of supporting the rebel LRA; likewise, the rebels accused the population of supporting the government army.

In March 1991, the Ugandan government started Operation North, which combined efforts to destroy the LRA, while disrupting popular support for the group through heavy-handed tactics. As part of Operation North, the army created the "Arrow Groups", village guards mostly armed with bows and arrows. The creation of the Arrow Groups angered Kony, who began to feel that he no longer had the support of the population. After the failure of Operation North, Betty Oyella Bigombe initiated the first face-to-face meeting between representatives of the LRA and the NRA government.

The rebels asked for a general amnesty for their combatants and to "return home", but the government's stance was confused by disagreement over the credibility of the LRA negotiators and political infighting. At a meeting in January 1994, Kony asked for six months to regroup his troops, but by early February, the negotiations became increasingly bitter and the LRA broke off negotiations, accusing the government of trying to entrap them.

Starting in the mid-1990s, the LRA was strengthened by military support from the government of Sudan, which was retaliating against Ugandan government support for rebels in what would become South Sudan. The LRA fought the NRA, leading to mass atrocities such as the killing or abduction of several hundred villagers in Atiak in 1995 and the kidnapping of 139 school girls in Aboke in 1996 that were forced to become soldiers and also sex slaves to the soldiers. The government created the so-called "protected camps" beginning in 1996. The LRA declared a short-lived ceasefire for the duration of 1996 Ugandan presidential election, possibly in the hope that Yoweri Museveni would be defeated. Based on 1999 UNICEF data, over 6,000 children were held by LRA rebels in Northern Uganda.

=== 2001–2006 ===
In March 2002, the NRA, now the UPDF, launched a massive military offensive code-named Operation Iron Fist against LRA bases in southern Sudan, with agreement from the National Islamic Front. In retaliation, the LRA attacked the refugee camps in northern Uganda and the Eastern Equatoria in southern Sudan (now South Sudan), brutally killing hundreds of civilians.

By 2004, according to the UPDF spokesperson Shaban Bantariza, mediation efforts by the Carter Center and Pope John Paul II had been spurned by Kony. In February 2004, the LRA unit led by Okot Odhiambo attacked the Barlonyo internally displaced person camp, killing over 300 people and abducting many others.

In 2006, UNICEF estimated that the LRA had abducted at least 25,000 children since the conflict began. In January 2006, eight Guatemalan Kaibiles commandos and at least 15 rebels were killed in a botched United Nations special forces raid targeting the LRA deputy leader Vincent Otti in DR Congo.

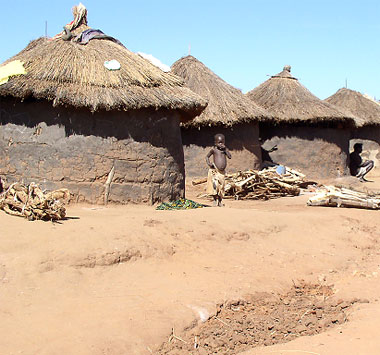
The conflict forced many civilians to live in internally displaced person (IDP) camps, such as this Labuje IDP camp near Kitgum, Uganda, in 2005.

According to the UN Office for the Coordination of Humanitarian Affairs (OCHA), the LRA attacks and the government's counterinsurgency measures resulted in the displacement of nearly 95 percent of the Acholi population in three districts of northern Uganda. By 2006, 1.7 million people lived in more than 200 IDP camps in northern Uganda. These camps had some of the highest mortality rates in the world. The Ugandan Ministry of Health and partners estimated that, through the first seven months of 2005, about 1,000 people were dying weekly, chiefly from malaria and AIDS. During the same time period of January–July 2005, the LRA abducted 1,286 Ugandans (46.4 percent of whom were children under the age of 15 years), and violence accounted for 9.4 percent of the 28,283 deaths, occurring mostly outside camps.

=== 2007–present ===
In 2006–2008, a series of meetings were held in Juba, Sudan, between the government of Uganda and the LRA, mediated by the south Sudanese separatist leader Riek Machar. The Ugandan government and the LRA signed a truce on 26 August 2006. Under the terms of the agreement, LRA forces would leave Uganda and gather in two assembly areas in the remote Garamba National Park in the northern DR Congo that the Ugandan government agreed not to attack.

Between December 2008 – March 2009, the armed forces of Uganda, DR Congo, and South Sudan launched aerial attacks and raids on the LRA camps in Garamba, destroying them. The efforts to inflict a military defeat on the LRA were not fully successful. The US supported Operation Lightning Thunder against the LRA. There were brutal revenge attacks by scattered LRA remnants, with over 1,000 people killed and hundreds abducted in DR Congo and South Sudan. Hundreds of thousands were displaced while fleeing the massacres. The military action did not result in the capture or killing of Kony, who remained elusive.

During December 2008, the LRA massacred at least 143 people and abducted 180 at a concert celebration sponsored by the Roman Catholic church in Faradje in DR Congo. The LRA struck several other communities in near-simultaneous attacks: 75 people were murdered in a church near Dungu, at least 80 in Batande, 48 in Bangadi, and 213 in Gurba.

By August 2009, the LRA attacks in DR Congo resulted in displacing as many as 320,000 Congolese, exposing them to famine and disease, according to UNICEF director Ann Veneman. Also in August 2009, the LRA attacked a Catholic church in Ezo, South Sudan, on the Feast of the Assumption, with reports of victims being crucified, causing Ugandan Archbishop John Baptist Odama to call upon the international community for help in finding a peaceful solution to the crisis.

In December 2009, the LRA forces under Dominic Ongwen killed at least 321 civilians and abducted 250 others during a four-day attack in the village and region of Makombo in DR Congo. In February 2010, about 100 people were killed by the LRA in Kpanga, near DR Congo's border with the Central African Republic and Sudan. Small-scale attacks continued daily, displacing large numbers of people and worsening an ongoing humanitarian crisis, which the UN described as one of the worst in the world.

By May 2010, the LRA killed over 1,600 Congolese civilians and abducted more than 2,500. Between September 2008 and July 2011, the group, despite being down to only a few hundred fighters, had killed more than 2,300 people, abducted more than 3,000, and displaced over 400,000 across DR Congo, South Sudan, and the Central African Republic.

In March 2012, Uganda announced it would head a new four-nation African Union military force (a brigade of 5,000, including contingents from DR Congo, the Central African Republic, and South Sudan) to hunt down Kony and the remnants of the LRA, but asked for more international assistance for the task force.

In 2012 the LRA was reported to be in Djema, Central African Republic, but forces pursuing the LRA withdrew in April 2013 after the government of the Central African Republic was overthrown by the Séléka Coalition rebels.

The UPDF rescued more than 15,000 people that were abducted since 1986. It is estimated that in the 20 years of activity over 50,000 children were captured in Northern by the LRA.

As of 2022, it was reported that the LRA consisted of splinter groups, totaling 1,000 members altogether and was militarily very weak. It acted more like a criminal gang than an army, smuggling ivory and arms across the DR Congo border. In 2024, LRA officer Thomas Kwoyelo was tried in Uganda on charges including rape, murder, kidnapping, and enslavement of civilians. He was sentenced to 40 years in prison.

== Causes of the LRA conflict ==
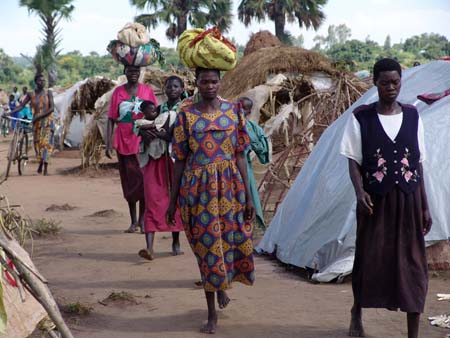
Displaced people seek refuge from the LRA in Uganda.

=== Ethnicity, stereotypes, hate, and enemy images ===
Part of the structural causes of the LRA conflict has been explained as rooted in the "diversity of ethnic groups which were at different levels of socio-economic development and political organization", leading to ethnic strife. Enemy images have instilled insensitivity to the extent that people perceived as enemies can be deemed inconsequential. A former Cabinet minister, a key figure in the Presidential Peace Team, warned elders in Lango of atrocities committed by the NRA in the northern districts of Gulu, Kitgum, Lira, Apac, and Teso, telling them that "they did not matter as long as the south was stable". This sense of betrayal of the northerners led to a groundswell of mistrust by the population against virtually any overtures from the government to the rebels.

This strategy, some argue, was deeply rooted and employed in the Luwero triangle by the National Resistance Movement (NRM) rebels during their five-year bush war in order to garner popular support, with an underlying drive of "unique greed for absolute political power" in total abhorrence of democratic means.

=== Economic disparity and marginalization ===
The strong imbalance in the level of development and investment between Eastern and Northern Uganda on the one side, and Central and Western Uganda on the other perceived as wealthy, is a manifestation of the economic marginalization of the region, in spite of the fact most of the top leadership in Uganda hailed from the north between 1962 and 1985. This marginalization, along with the consequences of wars, has resulted in varying poverty levels in northern Uganda, for most of the NRM's rule. Although poverty at times may be treated as an escalating factor which creates resentment in society, its role in the conflict in northern Uganda is part of the underlying structural factors. The Poverty Status Report, 2003, indicates that "one-third of the chronically poor (30.1%) and a disproportionate number moving into poverty are from northern Uganda".

=== Contributing factors ===
The LRA is believed to be a consequence of an ethnic-oriented war initiated by the NRM in the Luwero Triangle against the residents of northern Uganda. This was fueled by the belief on the part of the leadership of the NRM that Ugandan politics had, since independence, been dominated by northerners because of their heavy presence in the armed forces. This led to the belief that the domination of politics in Uganda by northerners was no longer acceptable and had to end, suggesting that until this had been achieved and all threats from northerners removed, the war had to continue.

In 2012, scholar Mahmood Mamdani argued that "[t]he reason why the LRA continues is that its victims—the civilian population of the area—trust neither the LRA nor government forces". He believes that "a Ugandan political solution" ("political process"), rather than "military mobilisation" and international "escalation", was what was needed to resolve this conflict.

== Ideology ==
The LRA's ideology is disputed among academics. In practice, "the LRA is not motivated by any identifiable political agenda, and its military strategy and tactics reflect this". It appears to largely function as a cult of personality of its leader, Joseph Kony. Although the LRA has been regarded primarily as a Christian militia, the LRA reportedly evokes Acholi nationalism on occasion; many observers doubt the sincerity of this behaviour and the loyalty of Kony to any ideology.

The original aims of the group were more closely aligned with those of its predecessor, the Holy Spirit Movement. Protection of the Acholi population was of particular concern because of the genuine reality of ethnic purges in the history of Uganda. This created a great deal of concern in the Acholi community, as well as a strong desire for formidable leadership and protection.

As the conflict has progressed, fewer and fewer Acholi offered sufficient support to the rebels in the eyes of the LRA. This led to an increased amount of violence toward the non-combatant population, which further alienated them from the rebels. This self-perpetuating cycle led to the creation of a strict divide between Acholis and rebels—a divide that was previously not explicitly present.

Robert Gersony, in a report funded by the US embassy in Kampala in 1997, concluded that "the LRA has no political program or ideology, at least none that the local population has heard or can understand". The International Crisis Group has stated that "the LRA is not motivated by any identifiable political agenda, and its military strategy and tactics reflect this".

IRIN comments that "the LRA remains one of the least understood rebel movements in the world, and its ideology, as far as it has one, is difficult to understand". During an interview with IRIN, LRA commander Vincent Otti was asked about the LRA's vision of an ideal government. He responded:

Lord's Resistance Army is just the name of the movement because we are fighting in the name of God. God is the one helping us in the bush. That's why we created this name, Lord's Resistance Army. And people always ask us, are we fighting for the Ten Commandments of God. That is true—because the Ten Commandments of God is the constitution that God has given to the people of the world. All people. If you go to the constitution, nobody will accept people who steal, nobody could accept to go and take somebody's wife, nobody could accept to kill the innocent, or whatever. The Ten Commandments carries all this.

Norwegian scholar Knut Holter has argued that what the LRA means by the "Ten Commandments" is somewhat loosely associated with the Ten Commandments as found in the Biblical text. Holter notes that the LRA have created new commandments that help propagate their ideology under the term the "Ten Commandments". One such example is the LRA's commandment given as "Thou shalt not smoke."

In a speech, James Obita, a former secretary for external affairs and mobilisation of the LRA, adamantly denied that the LRA was "just an Acholi thing" and stated that claims made by the media and Museveni administration asserting that the LRA is a "group of Christian fundamentalists with bizarre beliefs whose aim is to topple the Museveni regime and replace it with governance based on the Bible's ten commandments" were false. In the same speech, Obita also claimed that the LRA's objectives are:

1. To fight for the immediate restoration of competitive multi-party democracy in Uganda.
2. To see an end to gross violation of human rights and dignity of Ugandans.
3. To ensure the restoration of peace and security in Uganda.
4. To ensure unity, sovereignty, and economic prosperity beneficial to all Ugandans.
5. To bring to an end to the repressive policy of deliberate marginalization of groups of people who may not agree with the NRA's ideology.

=== Symbols and flags ===
The LRA is known to have used several flags and logos over the course of its insurgency. During peace talks in 2006, LRA commander Vincent Otti sketched the official LRA coat of arms, providing it to academic Mareike Schomerus: The emblem consisted of Uganda's national animal, the crested crane, standing atop two palm fronds forming a circle. Within the circle there is a star, a crescent moon, and a heart containing the Ten Commandments. Over and below the palm fronds the group's name can be found on two small banners.

At the time, Otti stated that crane signified pride in Uganda, the palm fronds stood for peace, the Ten Commandments for the group's commitment to Christianity, and the crescent for the oneness of God regardless of religion. Otti claimed that the symbol adorned every LRA uniform, and that he had designed it. It is unclear whether the group continued to use the symbol after Otti's alleged execution by Kony.

By 2010, the LRA no longer used standardized uniforms, instead plundering clothing. Its troops often adorned their uniforms with the flags of enemy states to confuse their opponents, for instance using the regular flag of Uganda and the flag of the Netherlands. The U.S. Director of National Intelligence also attributed a red-black-blue flag to the LRA.

Symbol of the LRA, painted by Vincent Otti in 2006

Red-black-blue flag often attributed to the LRA

Regular flag of Uganda, also used by the group

Flag of the Netherlands, adorning the uniform of a slain LRA militant (possibly senior commander Opiyo Sam) in 2010.

== Strength ==
In 2007, the government of Uganda claimed that the LRA had only 500 or 1,000 soldiers in total, but other sources estimated that there could have been as many as 3,000 soldiers, along with about 1,500 women and children. By 2011, unofficial estimates were in the range of 300 to 400 combatants, with more than half believed to be abductees. The soldiers are organized into independent squads of 10 or 20 soldiers.

By early 2012, the LRA had been reduced to a force of between 200 and 250 fighters, according to Ugandan defence minister Crispus Kiyonga. Abou Moussa, the UN envoy in the region, said in March 2012 that the LRA was believed to have dwindled to between 200 and 700 followers, but still remained a threat: "The most important thing is that no matter how little the LRA may be, it still constitutes a danger [as] they continue to attack and create havoc."

Since the LRA first started fighting in the 1990s, they may have forced well over 10,000 boys and girls into combat, often killing family, neighbors, and school teachers in the process. Many of these children were put on the frontlines, leading to high casualty rates for these children. The LRA often used children to fight because they are easy to replace by raiding schools or villages. According to Livingstone Sewanyana, executive director of the Foundation for Human Rights Initiative, the government was the first to use child soldiers in this conflict.

Although unproven, there have been rumors that Sudan may have provided military assistance to the LRA, in response to Uganda lending military support to the Sudan People's Liberation Army (SPLA). According to Matthew Green, author of The Wizard of the Nile: The Hunt for Africa's Most Wanted, the LRA was highly organised and equipped with crew-operated weapons, VHF radios, and satellite phones. In 2001, it was also reported that the LRA targets Sudanese refugees.

== International Criminal Court investigation ==
The International Criminal Court (ICC) issued arrest warrants on 8 July and 27 September 2005 against Joseph Kony, his deputy Vincent Otti, and the three LRA commanders Okot Odhiambo and Raska Lukwiya, deputy army commanders, and Dominic Ongwen, brigade commander of the Sania Brigade of the LRA. The five LRA leaders were charged with crimes against humanity and war crimes, including murder, rape, and sexual slavery. Ongwen was the only of the five not charged with recruiting child soldiers. The warrants were filed under seal; redacted versions were released to the public on 13 October 2005.

These were the first warrants issued by the ICC since it was established in 2002. Details of the warrants were sent to the three countries where the LRA is active: Uganda, Sudan (the LRA was active in what is now South Sudan), and DR Congo. The LRA leadership has long stated that they would never surrender unless they were granted immunity from prosecution; so the ICC order to arrest them raised concerns that the insurgency would not have a negotiated end.

The indictments received warm praise within the international community. However, the Acholi people showed mixed reactions. Many felt that amnesty for the LRA soldiers and a negotiated settlement was the best hope for the end of the war. In the end, the court's intent to prosecute the leaders of the LRA reduced the army's willingness to cooperate in peace negotiations.

On 30 November 2005, the LRA deputy commander, Vincent Otti, contacted the BBC announcing a renewed desire among the LRA leadership to hold peace talks with the Ugandan government. The government expressed skepticism regarding the overture but stated their openness to a peaceful resolution of the conflict.

On 2 June 2006, Interpol issued five red notices to 184 countries on behalf of the ICC, which has no police of its own. Kony had been previously reported to have met the vice president of South Sudan, Riek Machar. The next day, Human Rights Watch reported that the regional government of Southern Sudan had ignored previous ICC warrants for the arrest of four of LRA's top leaders and instead supplied the LRA with cash and food as an incentive to stop attacking southern Sudanese citizens.

At least two of the five wanted LRA leaders have since been killed: Lukwiya in August 2006 and Otti in late 2007 (executed by Kony). Odhiambo was rumoured to have been killed in April 2008. In February, 2015, UPDF forces found the body of an unidentified person. In April, DNA tests established that the body was that of Odhiambo.

In July 2011, South Sudan seceded from Sudan, cutting the LRA off geopolitically from its former allies in Khartoum.

In January 2015, Ongwen was reported either to have defected or been captured and held by the Ugandan forces. He was successively transferred from Ugandan forces to Central African Republic forces before ultimately entering into ICC custody. Ongwen made his first appearance before the ICC on 26 January 2015. In a trial that lasted between 6 December 2016 to 12 March 2020, 4,095 victims were granted the right to participate and represented in court. In February 2021, the ICC found him guilty of 61 crimes including war crimes, crimes against humanity, and the crime of forced marriage.

== Foreign involvement ==
=== United States ===
After the September 11 attacks, the United States declared the LRA to be a terrorist group. On 28 August 2008, the US Department of State sanctioned Kony as a Specially Designated Global Terrorist under Executive Order 13224 "Specially Designated Global Terrorists", a designation that carries financial and other penalties.

In November 2008, U.S. President George W. Bush personally signed a directive to the US Africa Command to provide assistance, financially and logistically, to the Ugandan government during the unsuccessful Garamba Offensive. No U.S. troops were directly involved, but 17 U.S. advisers and analysts provided intelligence, equipment, and fuel. The offensive pushed the LRA from its jungle camp, but Kony was not captured. One hundred children were rescued.

In May 2010, U.S. President Barack Obama signed into law the Lord's Resistance Army Disarmament and Northern Uganda Recovery Act, aimed at stopping Kony and the LRA. The bill passed unanimously in the Senate on 11 March 2010, with 65 senators as cosponsors, then passed unanimously in the House of Representatives on 13 May 2010, with 202 representatives as cosponsors. On 24 November 2010, Obama delivered a strategy document to Congress, asking for money to disarm Kony and the LRA.

On 14 October 2011, Obama announced that he had ordered the deployment of 100 U.S. military advisors with a mandate to train, assist, and provide intelligence to help combat the LRA, reportedly from the Army Special Forces, at a cost of approximately $4.5 million per month. Human Rights Watch welcomed the deployment, which they had previously advocated for.

Obama said that the deployment did not need explicit approval from Congress, as the 2010 Lord's Resistance Army Disarmament and Northern Uganda Recovery Act already authorized "increased, comprehensive U.S. efforts to help mitigate and eliminate the threat posed by the LRA to civilians and regional stability". The military advisors would be armed and provide assistance and advice but "will not themselves engage LRA forces unless necessary for self-defense".

As of 2015, the U.S. provided support for military efforts, notably by the UPDF against the LRA. Some observers have reported that the U.S. has been involved for reasons other than the LRA.

In late 2013, Ugandan forces, alerted by U.S. troops, killed LRA chief planner Colonel Samuel Kangul, among others.

=== African Union ===
On 18 September 2012, the African Union (AU) launched an initiative in Nzara, South Sudan, to take control of the fight against the LRA. The goal of the project was to coordinate efforts against the group by the ongoing operations conducted by the states of Uganda, South Sudan, DR Congo and the Central African Republic. However, some fear that these armies are looting resources in the region. Civilians have reported rapes, killings, and looting by the Ugandan army.

In September 2012, at a ceremony to mark the handover of command in Yambio, the AU's special envoy on the LRA, Francisco Madeira, said that, while DR Congo had not sent supporting troops, it had made some other unnamed support. "We need more support, I don't have to elaborate on these because my predecessor has done this so well. We need support in terms of means of transport, communication, medicine, combat rations and uniforms for the troops tracking the LRA. This is particularly important and critical and most urgent for the central African troops who handed over their contingent despite the challenges facing them."

Ugandan Defence Minister Chrispus Kiyonga said: "We are yet to fully agree on how this troops will operate because now they are going to be one force, a regional task force with its commander. There are two concepts: There are people who think that the SPLA [Sudan People's Liberation Army] should only work on the side of Sudan, that the army of the Central African Republic should only work there [within its own borders ...] but there is the other concept that some of us support, [which is] that once there is one unified force, co-ordinated force then it should go wherever Kony is. We think that way, it will be more effective." He added that the newest intelligence reports at the time has suggested the LRA then had only 200 guns and numbered about 500 people, including women and children.

== See also ==
- Christian violence
- Christian terrorism
- Global Night Commute
- History of Christian thought on persecution and tolerance
- Resolve Uganda
- uNight
