= Okot Odhiambo =

Ugandan senior leader of the Lord's Resistance Army (died 2013)

- Born: Uganda
- Died: 27 October 2013
- Known for: Indicted by the International Criminal Court for war crimes and crimes against humanity
- Title: Major General
- Call sign: Two Victor

Okot Odhiambo (also known as Two Victor, his radio call sign) was a senior leader of the Lord's Resistance Army, a Ugandan militant group which operates from Garamba National Park in the Democratic Republic of the Congo. Odhiambo was one of five people for whom the International Criminal Court (ICC) issued its first ever arrest warrants in 2005, for alleged war crimes and crimes against humanity. In 2009, he announced his intention to defect from the LRA and return to Uganda if the government would agree not to surrender him to the ICC.

== Lord's Resistance Army ==
Odhiambo was reported to be the LRA's Deputy Army Commander and a member of the "Control Altar", the core leadership group responsible for devising and implementing LRA strategy. He is believed to have become deputy leader of the LRA following the (alleged) death of Vincent Otti in October 2007.

=== International Criminal Court indictment ===
On 8 July 2005, Odhiambo was one of five LRA commanders for whom the ICC issued its first ever arrest warrants. The court ruled that there were reasonable grounds to believe that Odhiambo had ordered the commission of war crimes and crimes against humanity. The prosecution alleges that Odhiambo led a number of massacres and commanded attacks against two internally displaced person camps in 2004, during which more than 300 people were burnt, shot and hacked to death and children were abducted. Odhiambo was charged with two counts of crimes against humanity (murder and enslavement) and eight counts of war crimes (murder, intentionally directing attacks against civilian populations, pillaging, and forced enlisting of children) in connection with the two attacks.

According to the ICC warrant for his arrest, Odhiambo is described by former LRA commanders and members as a "ruthless killer", as "the one who killed the most", and as "a 'bitter' man who will kill anyone".

=== Defection from the LRA ===
In April 2008, it was reported that Odhiambo and eight others had been killed by LRA leader Joseph Kony during a dispute over a proposed peace deal. However, on 29 January 2009, Odhiambo said he had suffered a serious gunshot wound during a clash with Ugandan forces and was defecting from the LRA. He told Agence France-Presse, "We have requested a safe corridor. I want to come out. I am tired of going up and down all the time." He contacted the International Organization for Migration seeking safe passage to Uganda, along with 45 other rebels and 10 abductees, but said he would not surrender unless he was given a guarantee that he would not be turned over to the ICC. The government of Uganda has indicated that it would try Odhiambo in a national court rather than surrender him to the ICC.

The Catholic Archbishop of Gulu, John Baptist Odama, said the defection could revive hopes of a peaceful end to the conflict. However, Amnesty International criticized the International Organization for Migration for agreeing to facilitate Odhiambo's transfer to Uganda instead of to the ICC.

An LRA spokesman dismissed the reports of Odhiambo's planned defection, claiming the story was invented by the Ugandan army "to create disharmony and danger to LRA fighters".

In February 2014, it was reported that Odhiambo had been killed on the 27th of October 2013. Odhiambo's body was found based on GPS coordinates provided by the man who buried him after his death and afterward defected to UPDF forces. His body was exhumed on 20 March 2015, and flown to Entebbe, Uganda for identity confirmation. The death of Odhiambo was confirmed, and the ICC dropped its proceedings against him in September of that year.
