= Justine Odong Latek =

Ugandan brigadier

Justine Odong Latek (died November 1989) was a Ugandan military officer and rebel leader who served in the Uganda National Liberation Army (UNLA) during the Ugandan Bush War and later led the Uganda People's Democratic Army (UPDA) during the 1986–1994 war in Uganda.

== Biography ==
Odong Latek was a veteran of Kikosi Maalum who continued his military service with the UNLA following the Uganda–Tanzania War. He rose to captain until President Milton Obote was overthrown by parts of the UNLA in the 1985 Ugandan coup d'état. Under the new President Tito Okello, Odong Latek was promoted to brigadier and put in charge of Gulu.

Following the victory of Yoweri Museveni's National Resistance Army (NRA) and the collapse of Okello's regime in 1986, Latek formed the UPDA. On 16 August 1986, the UPDA began attacks upon NRA units in Acholiland. However, the UPDA was unable to wrest control of the population centers from the NRA. Following a 21 March 1987 meeting with the NRA, General Salim Saleh flew to the UPDA base and met with Latek, who is reported to have stated his support for the peace agreement. However, in May the UPDA replaced Latek with Angelo Okello, who had been commander of the UPDA Division One in Gulu. Okello signed a peace agreement on 3 June 1988. A 1997 report states that Latek and several UPDA units loyal to him did not take place in the peace talks on the advice of the UPDA political wing in London.

Latek and his followers then joined the Lord's Resistance Army to continue fighting. According to the recollection of a captured LRA commander, in September 1987 Latek met with LRA leader Joseph Kony, who appointed Latek overall military commander. According to a former close confidant of Kony, however, Odong Latek and a group of his followers were relaxing in a secluded part of Kitgum District when they were surprised by Kony's forces. They were rounded up, whereupon Kony assured the ex-UPDA fighters that they would not be harmed. Odong Latek was then "invited" to join Kony's force.

In November 1989, Odong Latek was killed when the NRA stormed a rebel camp at Pawic in Palabek County, Lamwo District.
