= Vincent Otti =

Ugandan guerrilla militant (c. 1946–2007)

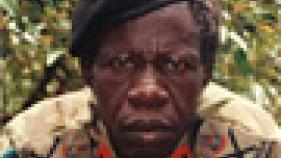
- Vincent Otti in Uganda; Image courtesy of the International Criminal Court
- Born: c. 1946; Atiak, Gulu District, Protectorate of Uganda
- Died: 2 or 8 October 2007 (aged 60–61)
- Military career
- Allegiance: Lord's Resistance Army
- Criminal information
- Criminal charges: 21 counts of war crimes, 11 counts of crimes against humanity (2005)
- Capture status: Dead or at large
- Wanted by: International Criminal Court
- Wanted since: 8 July 2005; 21 years ago

Vincent Otti (c. 1946 – 2 or 8 October 2007) was a Ugandan militant who served as deputy-leader of the Lord's Resistance Army (LRA), a rebel guerrilla army operating mainly in northern Uganda and South Sudan. He was one of the five people for whom the International Criminal Court (ICC) issued its first arrest warrants on 8 July 2005 during its investigation in Uganda. Rumours of his death began circulating in October 2007 and were substantiated in January 2008. On 17 November 2023, the ICC terminated proceedings against him, confirming his death.

== Early life ==
Otti was born around 1946 in the Atiak sub-county of Gulu District, Uganda. His parents died when he was young. He was working as a shopkeeper in Kampala when he joined the Lord's Resistance Army in 1987.

== Lord's Resistance Army ==
Vincent Otti joined the Lord's Resistance Army when it was founded in 1987. He rose to the rank of Lieutenant General and became the LRA's vice-chairman, second in command to Joseph Kony. He was reportedly a member of the "Control Altar", the core leadership group that devised the LRA's strategy.

In 1994, the LRA attacked Atiak, Otti's home town, killing more than 200 people. Otti's brothers reportedly fled the village after the family was accused of breeding a "killer". He is alleged to have led the Barlonyo massacre in February 2004, during which more than 300 villagers were shot, hacked and burned to death.

During the Juba peace talks, which began in July 2006, Otti emerged as the chief spokesperson for the LRA. According to LRA defector Sunday Otto, Otti was also the LRA's leading advocate of joining the peace talks. Otti's push to negotiate an end of the conflict led to tension with Kony and a growing split in the LRA.

== Indictment by the ICC ==
On 8 July 2005, a Pre-Trial Chamber of the International Criminal Court found that there were reasonable grounds to believe that Otti had committed war crimes and crimes against humanity, and issued a sealed warrant for his arrest. He was charged with 21 counts of war crimes (including murder, pillaging, inducing rape, forced enlisting of children, intentionally directing an attack against a civilian population, and cruel treatment of civilians) and 11 counts of crimes against humanity (including murder, sexual enslavement, and inhumane acts of inflicting serious bodily injury and suffering).

== Death ==
In October 2007, sources in the Ugandan military reported that "Otti was killed on or around 8 October 2007 during a high command meeting that Kony convened at his base camp in Garamba", following a disagreement with Kony over the peace process. LRA defector Sunday Otto, who claims to have been present during the execution, states that Otti was killed on 2 October, along with two other officers, and that Otti was the impetus behind the negotiations for peace, a view that is supported by the late conservationist Lawrence Anthony in his book The Last Rhinos (2012). Anthony writes that a few days before Otti was killed, Anthony had visited Otti in the bush to firm up an agreement that Anthony would help communicate the LRA's case at the 2005 round of peace talks, in exchange for the LRA's protection of endangered rhino species in the Congo. LRA spokesperson Martin Ojul has repeatedly denied that Otti was executed and claimed that Otti was simply suffering from cholera. On 7 November 2007, Kony told Gulu district chairman Norbert Mao that Otti was alive and had been detained for plotting to kill Kony and "conspiring with the enemies of the LRA". Kony also stated that Otti would not be allowed to speak with anyone until the LRA decided it was appropriate.

The President of Southern Sudan, Salva Kiir, said on 7 November 2007 that Otti's status remained unclear. The government of Southern Sudan has sent a team to the Congolese border to investigate Otti's fate.

The government newspaper New Vision reported on 22 November, based on statements from LRA defectors, that Otti had been executed by firing squad, along with "many others", on 2 October. Defectors said that he had asked Kony to allow him to speak to his son before his execution. "To strengthen Kony's spirit", Otti's body was said to not have been buried for three days after his death. Defectors also claimed Otti had been killed because of his enthusiasm for peace, thus raising questions about Kony's commitment to the peace negotiations. On 21 December 2007 a diplomatic briefing claimed that Otti was executed on 2 October 2007 at Kony's home. According to this account, when Otti arrived there he found that the home was surrounded by Kony's guards, and before entering he made a phone call to Kony due to his concern about this, but was reassured by Kony. Inside the house, however, LRA commanders held Otti at gunpoint and told him that he was arrested; he was then bound, blindfolded and taken outside, where he was shot, despite his pleas for mercy. Kony subsequently claimed that Otti had received foreign funds and was trying to kill him. On 23 January 2008, Kony stated that Otti was dead, without giving details.

On 17 November 2023, the ICC terminated proceedings against him, with the prosecutor stating “all available evidence indicates that Mr Otti was killed in a remote area of the Democratic Republic of Congo in October 2007."
