= Dominic Ongwen =

Ugandan rebel and convicted war criminal

- Born: Dominic Okumu Savio; 1975 (age 50–51); Coorom, Kilak County, Amuru district, Northern Uganda
- Other name: White Ant
- Known for: Former commander in the Lord's Resistance Army (LRA)
- Convictions: 6 May 2021
- Criminal charges: Crimes against humanity, war crimes
- Penalty: 25 years in prison

Details
- Date apprehended: 2014
- Imprisoned at: Unspecified Norwegian prison

Dominic Ongwen (born 1975) is a Ugandan former child soldier and former commander of one of the brigades of the Ugandan guerrilla group Lord's Resistance Army (LRA).

He was detained in 2014 and in 2021 the International Criminal Court convicted him of war crimes and crimes against humanity, including murder, rape, torture, and enslavement.

== Origins ==
Dominic Okumu Savio (his birth name) was born in the village of Choorum, Kilak County, Amuru district, Northern Uganda around 1975, the fourth son of Ronald Owiya and Alexy Acayo, two schoolteachers living in Paibona. His parents, like most others in Acoliland at the time, gave him a false name and trained him to use it if ever he was abducted, to protect the rest of the family. This name, Ongwen, means "born at the time of the white ant". It was later to become his nom de guerre.

== Abduction ==
Ongwen was abducted by the LRA as he walked to Abili Primary School in Koro. According to his own testimony this happened in 1988 when he was fourteen. However it has often been reported that he was nine or ten, and also that he was carried by other captives all the way up to the LRA's main military bases because he was 'too little to walk'.

When Ongwen's mother heard that he had been kidnapped, she refused to run away with the other villagers saying she was ready to face the rebels. On their return, some of Dominic Ongwen's family members found her dead and his father was later found dead too.

According to Private Eye, as a child Ongwen tried to escape; when caught he was forced to skin one of the others alive. Later, he had forced female prisoners to beat other prisoners to death, and he presided over death by stoning.

== Career ==
Once abducted, he underwent initiation ceremonies which included torture and being forced to watch violent rituals of people being killed. He was subsequently indoctrinated under the tutelage of Vincent Otti, while still a child, as an LRA fighter.

He then rose within the ranks becoming a major at the age of 18 and brigadier of the Sinia Brigade, one of the four LRA brigades, by his late twenties. Ongwen was a member of the "Control Altar" of the LRA that directs military strategy.

== Family ==
During his time with the LRA, Ongwen had multiple wives, including Jennifer, Santa (Min Tata), Margaret, Florence Ayot, Agnes Aber (Min Ayari), Fatuma and Nancy Abwot. It was in 1993 that Florence Ayot, herself an abductee, was "transferred" to Ongwen after her own husband died. He also fathered at least eleven children, four of them with Florence Ayot. Some sources claim he had "more than 20 children". Ayot later testified to the ICC that Ongwen, along with two other commanders and herself, had plotted to escape but their plan was discovered and Ongwen was demoted, disarmed and imprisoned for more than two weeks.

== Report of death ==
Ongwen was reported killed in combat with a unit of the Uganda People's Defence Force on 10 October 2005, and the identity of the body was confirmed by former LRA commanders. However, in July 2006, the ICC reported that genetic fingerprinting of the body confirmed that it was not Ongwen's. News reports of the time put Ongwen in southwest Equatoria, Southern Sudan, attempting to rejoin LRA head Joseph Kony in Garamba, Ituri Province, northeastern Democratic Republic of the Congo. Ongwen and a former wife featured in a film Picking up the Pieces by IRIN and released in October 2007. Uganda People's Defence Force spokesperson Maj. Felix Kulayije commented, "Unfortunately, the bastard is still alive."

== Charges ==
Ongwen was the lowest ranking of the five LRA leaders for whom the ICC issued their first ever warrants in June 2005. He is the only one whom the court succeeded in detaining, and, with the exception of the leader, Joseph Kony, is the only one now left alive. He was initially charged with four counts of war crimes (murder, cruel treatment of civilians, intentionally directing an attack against a civilian population and pillaging) and three counts of crimes against humanity (murder, enslavement, and inhumane acts of inflicting serious bodily injury and suffering). The crimes were allegedly committed on or about 20 May 2004 at the Lukodi IDP Camp in the Gulu District, Uganda. The charges all relate to an attack on a camp for internally displaced people in Uganda in 2004.

On 21 December 2015, the ICC charged Dominic Ongwen with crimes in addition to those set out in the warrant of arrest: a total of seventy counts. The additional charges related to attacks on the Pajule IDP camp, the Odek IDP camp and the Abok IDP camp. The counts brought against the suspect in the context of these attacks include attacks against the civilian population, murder, attempted murder, torture, cruel treatment, other inhumane acts, enslavement, outrages upon personal dignity, pillaging, destruction of property, and persecution. The expanded charges against Dominic Ongwen also include sexual and gender-based crimes committed from 2002 to 2005 in Sinia Brigade – forced marriage, rape, torture, sexual slavery, and enslavement – and the conscription and use of children under the age of 15 to participate actively in hostilities from 2002 to 2005, in Sinia Brigade.

The charges are based on evidence which included witness statements or transcripts of interviews of a total of 123 witnesses, records of intercepted LRA radio communications, and oral testimonies of seven witnesses in September and November 2015.

== Capture and arrest ==
In 2013, US offered a $5m (£3.3m) reward for information leading to his arrest. At the end of 2014, Ongwen escaped detention by Joseph Kony for having disobeyed Kony's orders and having refused to answer Kony's radio messages. Having escaped the camp near Songo, in Kafia Kingi, Ongwen came across nomadic cattle herders who took him to a Seleka rebel group near Sam Ouandja in CAR. The former Seleka group commander reached out to a merchant in Mboki, who in turn called an NGO worker in Obo. The latter reached out to the American Special Forces in Obo, CAR. An American helicopter dispatched to Sam Ouandja picked up Ongwen and brought him to Obo. The Seleka were initially unaware of Ongwen's identity but learned about it after the case became public in the media. The Seleka commander told the RFI he hoped to receive the promised reward of $5m. However, the reward was never paid, and the Americans never publicly acknowledged the Seleka rebels' role in the capture. Ongwen was then transferred successively to the Ugandan forces, the Central African Republic forces, and ultimately to the ICC.

During the time between his arrest and his transfer to the ICC Ongwen participated in several media activities including a radio broadcast, meetings with journalists and a video recording in which he claimed that he had surrendered because he had come to realize that he was "wasting his time in the bush" as "the LRA has no future". He urged other insurgents to resume their civilian lives.

== Detention and trial ==
On 26 January 2015, Ongwen made his first appearance before the ICC, but the commencement of the confirmation of charges hearing was postponed in order to allow the Prosecutor to prepare adequately for the hearing and to comply with the Chamber's instructions.

On 6 February 2015, ICC severed the proceedings against Dominic Ongwen from the case of The Prosecutor v. Joseph Kony, Vincent Otti, Okot Odhiambo and Dominic Ongwen. As the three other suspects in the case had not appeared or had not been apprehended, the Chamber deemed this necessary so as not to delay the pre-trial proceedings against Mr Ongwen.

The trial lasted from 6 December 2016 to 12 March 2020.

4107 victims were granted the right to participate in the proceedings though most chose to participate in the trial through legal representation.

On 26 January 2016, Ongwen appeared for a pre-trial hearing. On 23 March 2016, the ICC confirmed the 70 charges brought against him and committed him to trial. Ongwen denied all the charges against him.

During his detention, he has been visited by family members. He became father to another child following the visit of one of his wives. He has also been visited by four Acholi leaders, including the Paramount chief, His Highness David Onen Achana II, and the Archbishop of the Roman Catholic Archdiocese of Gulu John Baptist Odama. During this visit he asked for a rosary, a hymn book and a prayer book.

Ongwen's case is unique because he himself was abducted by the LRA and forced to be a child soldier before rising to leadership. So this is the first ICC case in which an inductee is being charged with the same crimes as those done to him. According to one commentator, "In no other ICC trial have case narratives been so opposite, morally complex and riddled with paradoxes".

=== Opposition to the ICC trial ===
On 20 January 2015, The Acholi Religious Leaders' Peace Initiative (ARLPI), an interconfessional organisation whose goal is to pursue peaceful resolution to the LRA conflict, issued a statement opposing Ongwen's detention and trial at the ICC. Seeing him as a victim, they recommend that he should be brought back to Uganda to undergo "the rituals of 'Mato Oput' (Reconciliation) for all that he went through during his time in "LRA captivity". The signatories contrast this traditional approach, which promotes restoration, transformation, healing and new life, with the ICC approach which they consider to be punitive and retributive. Geoffry Omony, programme director of YOLRED, an organisation that supports former soldiers, supports this point of view.

Other commentators consider that the ICC indictments directly contradict the Ugandan Parliament's blanket amnesty which has led to the demobilisation and reintegration of tens of thousands of rebels.

Family members, including his wife Florence Ayot and his brother Charles Ojar also pleaded for Ongwen not to be tried at the ICC.

Victims, however, have expressed hope in the ICC trial, claiming that without it there would be no justice in their lifetime for the grave violations they had endured during the conflict. Others have pointed to the failure of the Ugandan government to protect Ongwen from abduction when he was a child.

=== Sentence ===
On 4 February 2021, in a judgment of 1077 pages, Ongwen was convicted on 61 crimes, comprising both crimes against humanity and war crimes, including murder and attempted murder; rape; sexual slavery; forced marriage; torture; enslavement; outrage upon personal dignity; conscription and use of children under the age of 15 to participate actively in hostilities; pillaging; destruction of property and persecution. On 6 May 2021 the ICC pronounced a joint prison sentence of 25 years, taking into account the gravity of the crimes committed, as well as aggravating and mitigating circumstances.

The Defence filed appeals against the conviction (21 July 2021) and the sentence (26 August 2021). On 15 December 2022, the Appeals Chamber confirmed the decisions of the Trial Chamber on Dominic Ongwen’s guilt and sentence. On 18 December 2023, Ongwen was transferred to Norway to serve his sentence of imprisonment.

In February 2024, the International Criminal Court (ICC) awarded each victim of Dominic Ongwen, whose number is estimated at 49,772, symbolic individual compensation of 800 US dollars.

== See also ==
- Military use of children
- Lukodi Massacre
