= Post-presidency of Jimmy Carter =

Actions of U.S. President Jimmy Carter after leaving office

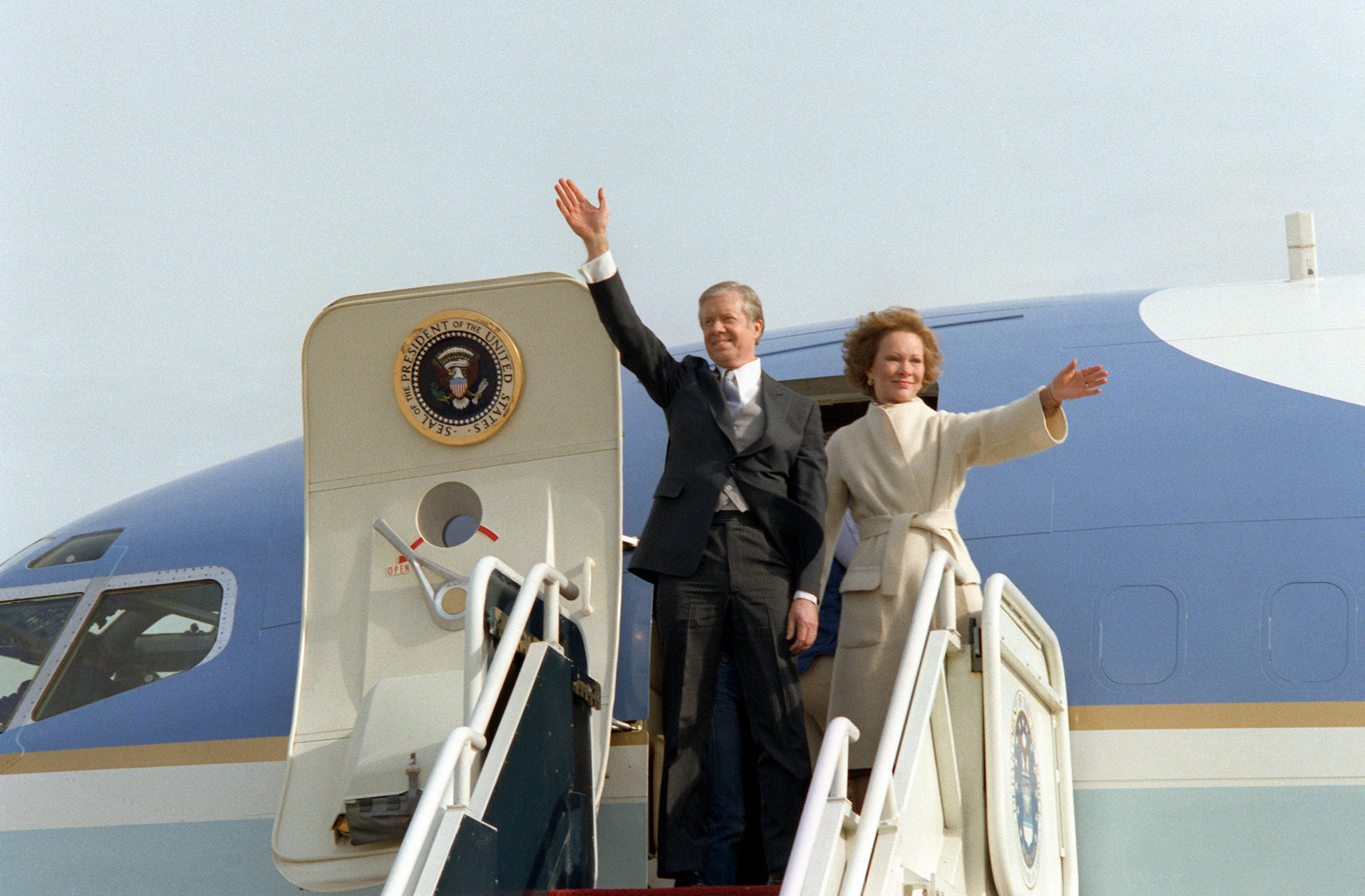
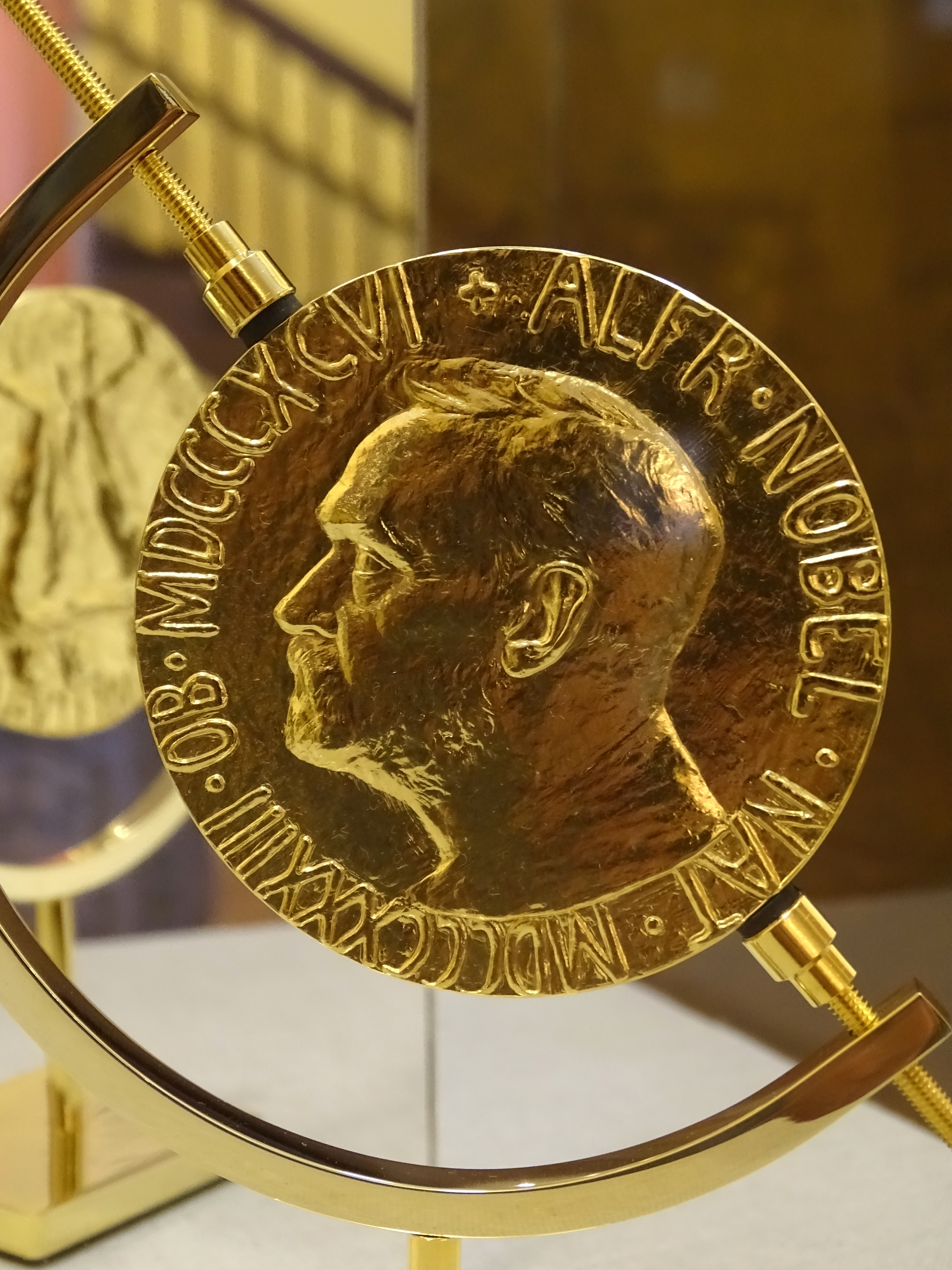
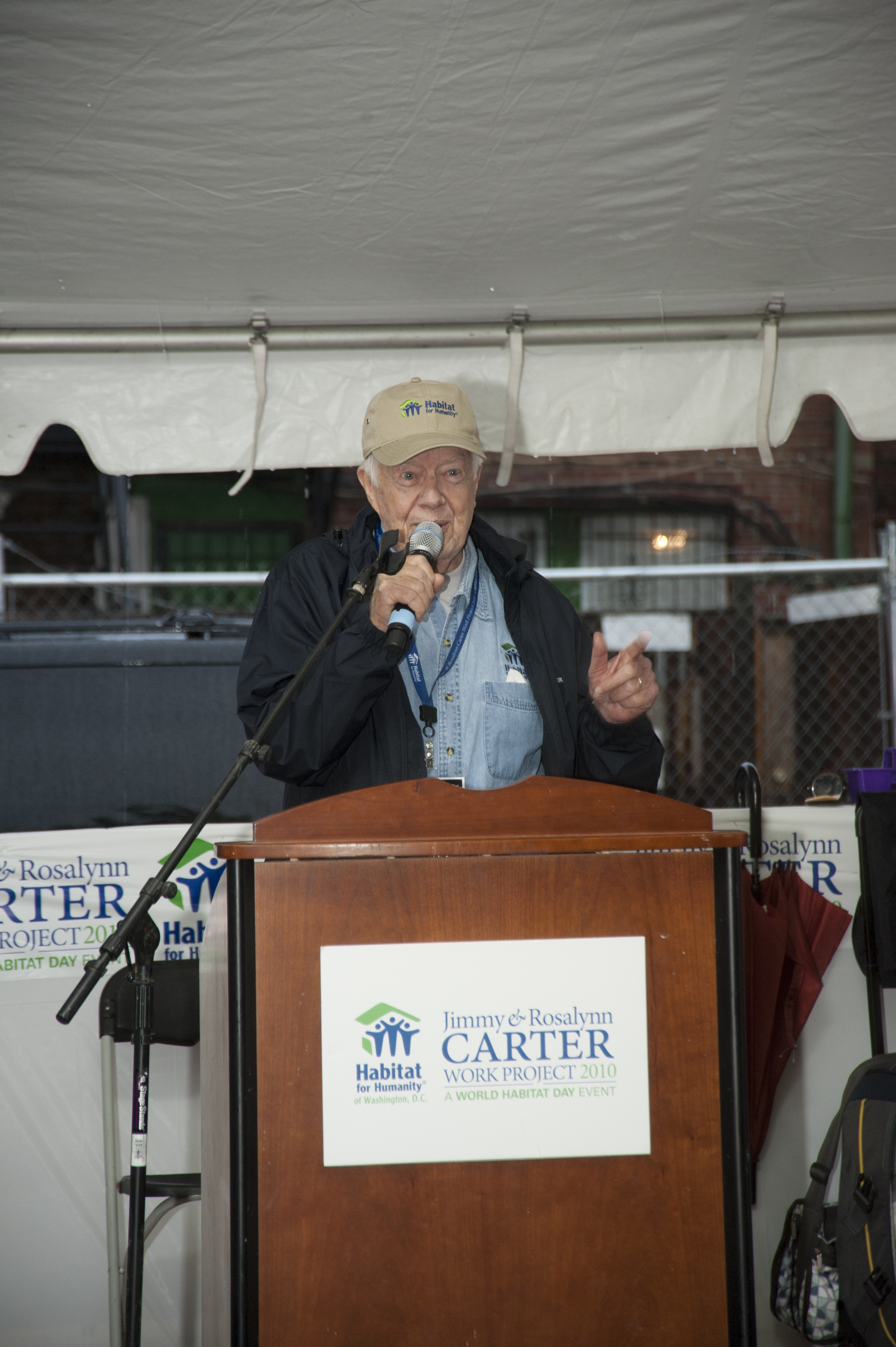
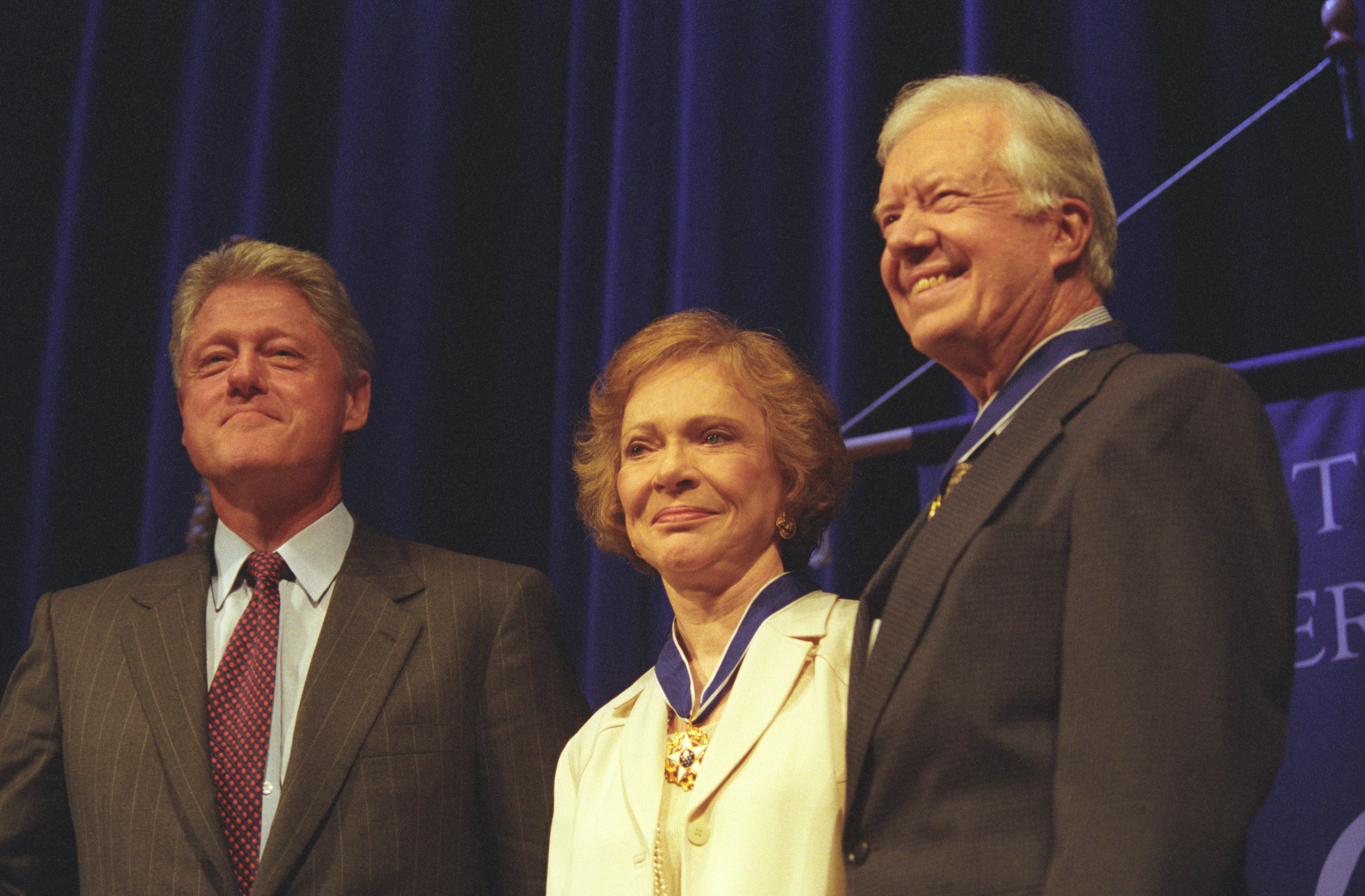
Clockwise from top:
Former President and former First Lady Carter wave from the departing aircraft after the inauguration of Ronald Reagan on January 20, 1981; Carter's 2002 Nobel Peace Prize; The Carters with President Bill Clinton after he presented the pair with Presidential Medals of Freedom, 9 August 1999; Carter speaking at a Habitat for Humanity event in 2010

Jimmy Carter was the 39th president of the United States, serving from 1977 to 1981. Carter's post-presidency, extending from 1981 until 2024, is widely considered by historians and political analysts to be one of the most accomplished of any former U.S. president. After leaving office, Carter remained engaged in political and social projects, establishing the Carter Center, building his presidential library, teaching at Emory University in Atlanta, and writing numerous books, ranging from political memoirs to poetry. He also contributed to the expansion of the nonprofit housing organization Habitat for Humanity.

After he left office, Carter returned to Georgia to his peanut farm, which he had placed into a blind trust during his presidency to avoid even the appearance of a conflict of interest. He found that the trustees had mismanaged the trust, leaving him more than one million dollars in debt. In 1982, he established the Carter Center to promote and expand human rights, which earned him a Nobel Peace Prize in 2002. He traveled extensively to conduct peace negotiations, monitor elections and further the eradication of infectious diseases. He and his wife Rosalynn were key figures in Habitat for Humanity. Carter wrote numerous books and continued to comment on global affairs, including two books on the Israeli–Palestinian conflict, in which he criticized Israel's treatment of Palestinians as apartheid. He and Rosalynn received the Presidential Medal of Freedom in 1999.

On February 18, 2023, it was announced that Carter was in home hospice care, which lasted 1 year, 315 days. Carter died on December 29, 2024, aged 100 years, 89 days. He was the oldest, longest-lived and longest-married president at 77 years, 135 days, and had the longest post-presidency, at 43 years, 344 days. He was the 4th-oldest living former state leader at the time of his death.

== 1980s and 1990s ==
=== Establishing presidential library ===
Shortly after losing his re-election bid, Carter told the White House press corps of his intent to emulate the retirement of Harry S. Truman and not use his subsequent public life to enrich himself. In February 1981, Carter toured Atlanta to pay courtesy calls to Georgia officials for the first time since leaving office and Atlanta university, and college presidents agreed on the compromise site of 219 acres of abandoned highway land.

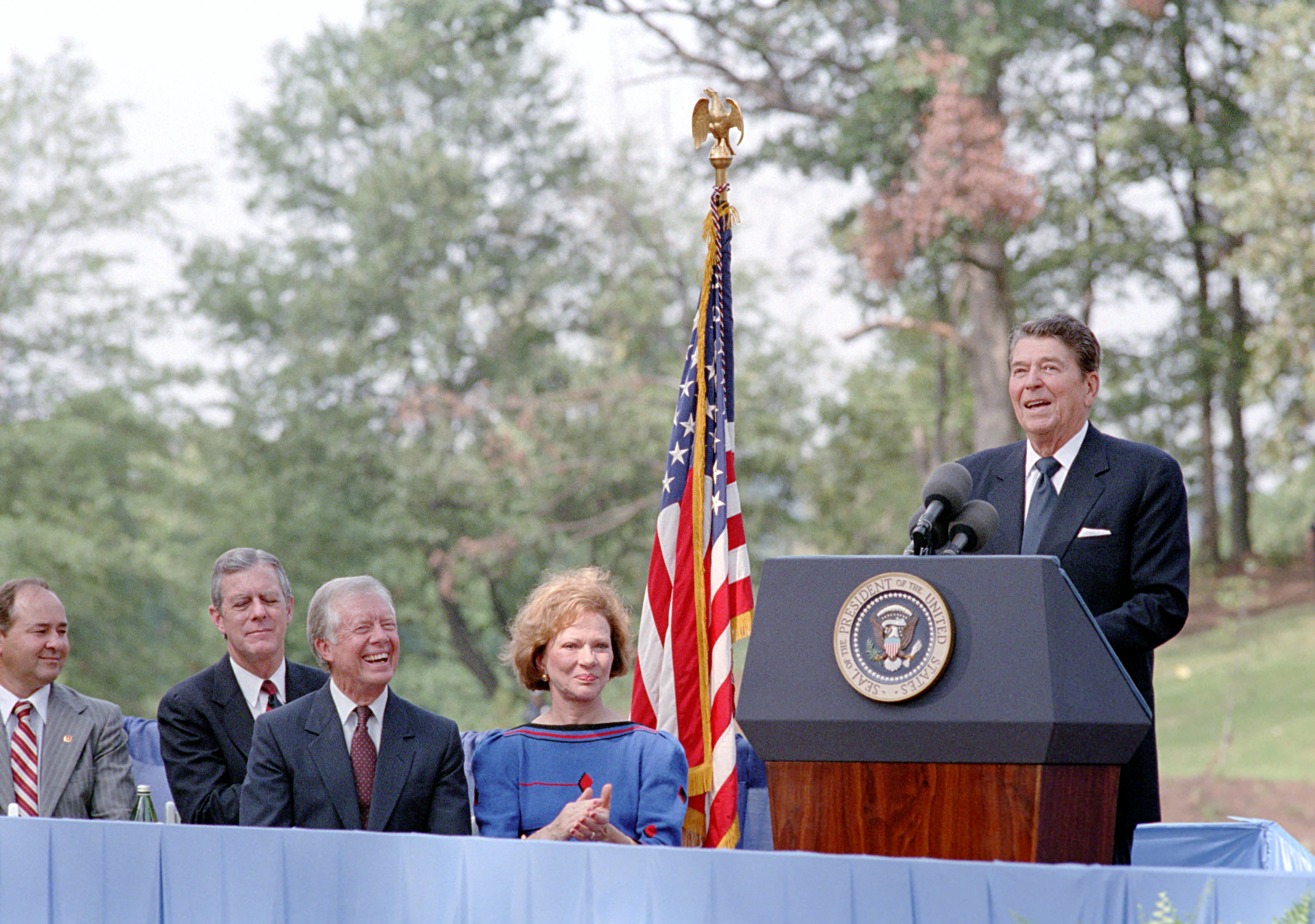
Ronald Reagan speaking at the dedication of the Jimmy Carter Presidential Library and Museum as the Carters look on, October 1, 1986

On September 22, 1983, at a ceremony attended by Mayor of Atlanta Andrew Young and Governor of Georgia Joe Frank Harris, Carter unveiled the model by an architect of his proposed Presidential Library and Museum as well as the Carter Policy Center. Carter said the policy center would allow freedom of expression as a non-official entity and that while he was not trying to copy Camp David, there should be a place where disputing countries can come in both absolute seclusion and secrecy. Dr. Steven Hochman served as Carter's assistant and they established an office for the Carter Center in the Emory University library. Construction on the library began in 1984. The landscape for the library called for the implementation of a parkway linking downtown Atlanta and the library. The Federal Highway Administration despite protests from residents who felt the road "could be redesigned to have less impact on historic areas". In July, Carter reported raising 23 million of the 25 million needed to begin construction on the library. Carter Presidential Library Inc. declined releasing the names of contributors, although Carter aide Dan Lee stated that half of the contributions came from Georgians.

On October 1, 1986, Carter's 62nd birthday, the Jimmy Carter Presidential Library and Museum was dedicated. Carter and his wife Rosalynn gave President Ronald Reagan and First Lady Nancy Reagan a private tour before Reagan delivered a speech praising Carter for "gracing the White House with your passion and intellect and commitment." Carter praised Reagan's remarks, saying he did not believe he had "ever heard (a speech) that was more gracious or more generous or more thoughtful" and that the address made him understand more clearly than ever why his re-election bid had been unsuccessful. It was the first meeting between Carter and Reagan in five years. The event was also attended by protestors of Reagan's arm control, South Africa, and economic policies.

=== First Reagan term (1981–1985) ===
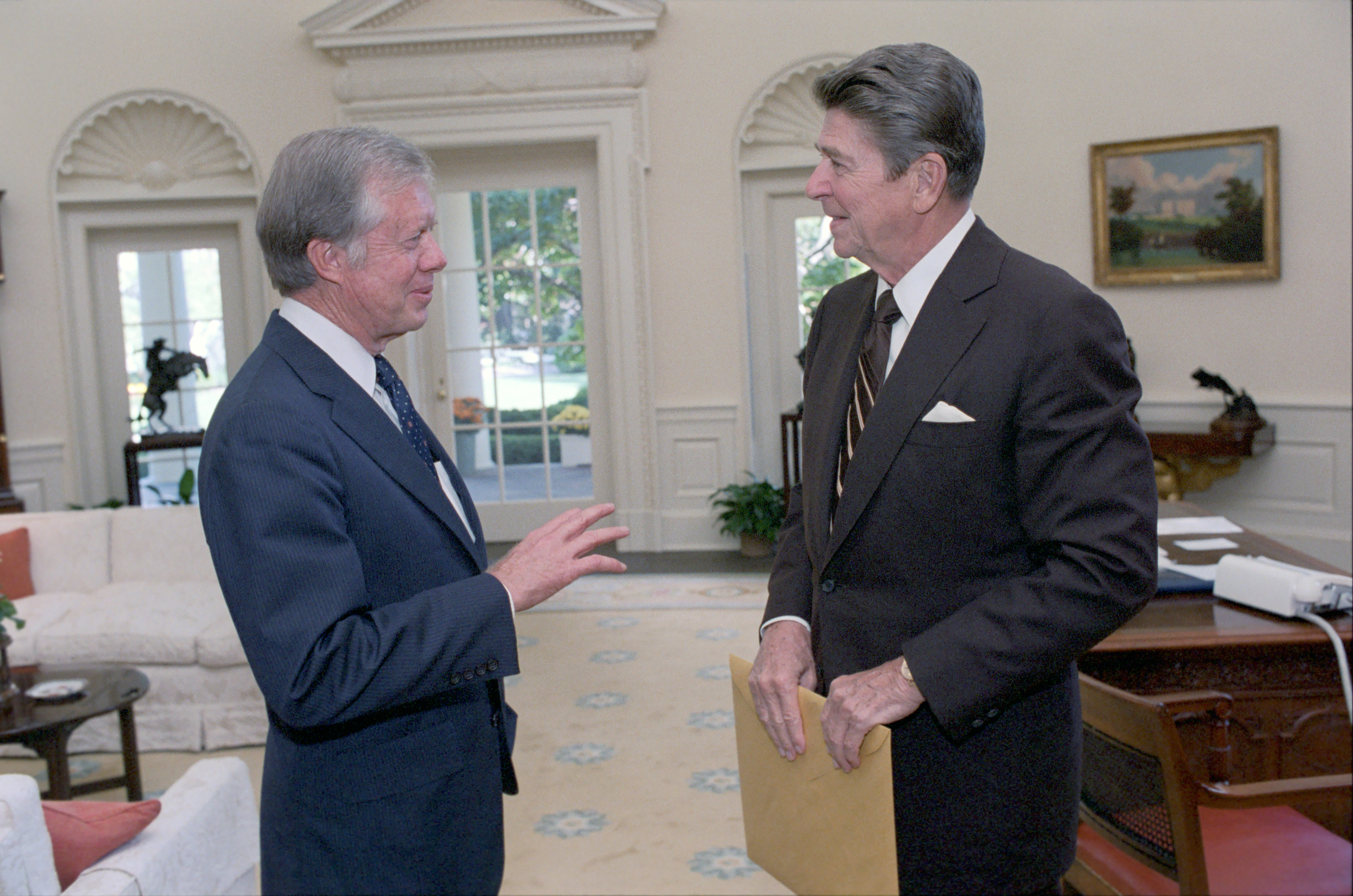
Carter meeting Ronald Reagan in the Oval Office, 1981

In March 1981, Carter cited his choice to refrain from critiquing Reagan was due to not enough time having passed within his tenure and predicted the "next few months" would see programs from his administration be viewed more favorably by the public. On March 31, after the attempted assassination, Carter said danger was a consistent part of being president and President Reagan's public appearances would not be curtailed. On May 8, while delivering a speech in Independence, Missouri, Carter critiqued "those who argue that the main business of government is to do nothing", the comment being seen as a reference to the Reagan administration. In a September 3 press conference, Carter confirmed that he was in agreement with Reagan on building neutron arms in the wake of the Soviet invasion of Afghanistan but said he hoped that when the Soviet Union "is willing to implement the termination of aggression and move towards peace and the control of nuclear weapons our country will be ready to cooperate with them completely as we have been in the past." In October, Carter traveled to Washington for the lobbying of senators in support of providing Saudi Arabia with Awacs radar surveillance aircraft and said he believed the Reagan administration was not doing enough in the Middle East.

During a May 1, 1982, fundraising dinner, Carter called on Democrats and Republicans to work together in solving America economic issues instead of the Democrats condemning the Reagan administration's budget for the fiscal year of 1983. On August 24, in a speech endorsing Charlie Rose in Fayetteville, North Carolina, Carter critiqued the Reagan administration for instituting radicalism in economic and social policies and administering "the highest tax cuts in history, primarily for the wealthy Americans, followed by the highest tax increase." On September 20, Carter stated more American involvement might have prevented the deaths in the Sabra and Shatila massacre and charged the Reagan administration with "belatedly ... playing its role as a strong mediator in bringing the parties together." On September 30, amid a fundraising dinner, Carter responded to criticism made by President Reagan during a news conference two days prior on his administration's handling of the economy by saying his administration "did not spend four years blaming our mistakes on our predecessors". On October 9, Carter expressed his distaste for his administration being blamed by President Reagan: "'When I became president, the responsibilities were mine. They were not Gerald Ford's, Richard Nixon's, they were not John Kennedy's, Dwight Eisenhower's or Harry Truman's -- they were mine." On October 26, Carter called on the Reagan administration to support the Camp David agreement during a news conference: "'Although it was tardy by about 18 months, I was very pleased by the speech President Reagan made recently about his intentions for a Middle East peace." While speaking at a news conference on November 10, Carter outlined his distaste with President Reagan shifting US foreign and domestic policy and said, "'There is always the temptation for an incumbent politician to blame all his mistakes on his predecessor. Most are willing to withstand the temptation. Mr. Reagan, apparently, is not."

In a January 1983 interview, Carter stated his belief that the Reagan campaign had convinced voters of an administration that would provide "simple answers to very complicated questions and simple and easy, magic solutions to intransigent problems." In February, Carter and Ford served as co-chairmen of a conference on public policy and communications at the Gerald R. Ford Presidential Library. They criticized Prime Minister of Israel Menachem Begin for his delays of Israeli troop withdrawing from Lebanon and for building Jewish settlements on the West Bank and endorsed the recommendations of Reagan's commission on Social Security reform. Carter specifically lamented public officials often only hearing the voices of "organized groups" who "speak much more narrowly and stridently than the people they represent, the doctors or the lawyers or the peanut farmers." During a June 1983 appearance at the Amnesty International conference on human rights at Emory University, Carter rebuked the Reagan administration for lacking an address on human rights violations. "The silence coming out of Washington these days, concerning these gross human rights violations, is very disturbing."

On October 9, 1984, while addressing a university group, Carter assessed Reagan with having characterized human rights as a sign of weakness during presidential debates four years prior and stated his disagreement with the view. "He's a Republican. I'm a Democrat. I can't swear that my policy is correct -- I think it is. I think in some ways our human rights policy was effective." In December 1984, during a press conference, Carter asserted that the Reagan administration was inactive in making rescue efforts to retrieve four American businessmen from West Beirut: "Our government is not making any effort to seek the return of the hostages. It is not a very publicized fact."

=== 1984 presidential election ===
The possibility of Carter running for a non-consecutive second term in 1984 was raised by commentators, and favored by his wife Rosalynn. Walter Mondale, Carter's former vice president who was mulling a presidential bid of his own, met with Carter ahead of the election year to confront him on whether he intended to run. On May 10, 1982, Carter stated he would support Mondale in the latter's presidential bid during a press conference. In June, Carter made an appearance at a dinner to raise funds for Democrats, offering praise of Mondale, who was also in attendance: "'A lot of people say Fritz has been going around the country and he hasn't mentioned me very often, but Fritz, tonight you outdid yourself and we're partners again."

On January 27, 1983, in interviews with the Houston Post and the Houston Chronicle, Carter stated his belief that President Reagan would lose his re-election bid due to Americans having been promised various solutions that Reagan was unable to keep and said he had disagreements with the administration "in human rights, arms control, environmental policies and the search for peace." On July 18, Carter said he believed President Reagan would still seek re-election despite a controversy over his campaign having had access to White House documents while in Japan. On August 30, Carter met with Mondale, telling reporters ahead of the meeting that Mondale had successfully distanced himself from the Carter administration to prevent the affiliation from being used against him.

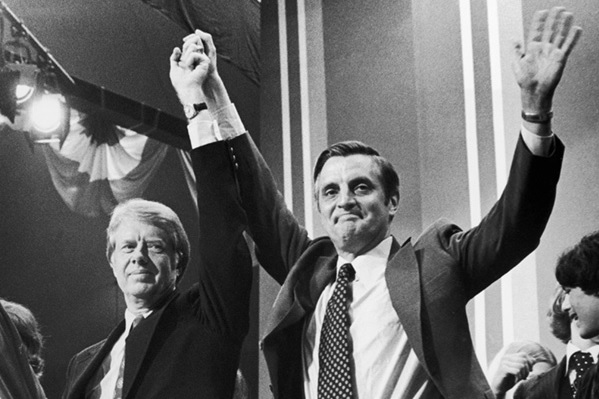
Carter and Mondale celebrating March 13th Democratic primary victories at Mondale campaign headquarters, 13 March 1984

During the 1984 Democratic presidential primary, Carter officially endorsed Mondale. According to Godbold, Jr., the former president felt he would best be aiding Mondale's presidential bid by working out of the spotlight. Mondale privately sought Carter's aid with the South and requested Carter approach the latter's 1976 rival George Wallace about endorsing the Mondale campaign. After Carter wrote a letter praising Wallace's management of Alabama and assuring him that Mondale "stood for the same Southern principles that he did", Wallace endorsed the former vice president. Carter backed out of giving Mondale advice on how to effectively campaign against Reagan. In a June 13, 1984 interview, Carter said he believed Reagan would back out of debating Mondale during the general election. On June 26, Carter announced that he would attend the 1984 Democratic National Convention and possibly speak but would hinder his remarks from taking Mondale, by then the presumptive Democratic Party presidential nominee, out of the spotlight. Carter also advocated Mondale hasten the process of selecting a running mate. National Democratic leaders were against Carter attending, but feared preventing him would attract more negative press, and their efforts to play down his role culminated in party chairman Charles Manatt placing him in a slot early in the convention that would be less televised than later portions.

While speaking at a news conference on November 7, after the election had taken place, Carter stated that Mondale's loss had been predictable due to the latter stating his intent to raise taxes. He added that he did not believe any Democrat could have won against Reagan's re-election bid.

=== Second Reagan term (1985–1989) ===
In a March 1985 interview with 60 Minutes, Carter contended that Reagan was at fault for a lack of progression in peace within the Middle East and charged Reagan with being "extremely successful in not being responsible for anything that's unpleasant". On April 11, Carter said that by supporting the Strategic Defense Initiative, the Reagan administration was "increasing misunderstanding between us and our allies" and giving the Kremlin an advantage in public relations. In July of that year, Carter expressed his disagreements with Reagan's claim of "an international conspiracy" on the issue of terrorism and with "some of the particular countries" Reagan asserted as supporting terrorism to the American Bar Association.

In February 1986, Carter traveled to Nicaragua for a three-day tour, being welcomed by Vice President of Nicaragua Sergio Ramírez who said Carter's visit was furthering "the policy of peace" as opposed to "the policy of war" carried out by the Reagan administration. In his talks with Tomás Borge, Carter secured the release of journalist Luis Mora and labor leader Jose Altamirano, saying during his departure that it was still possible for the US to "regain the path we envisioned in 1979." In December, Carter gave a speech at a fundraiser for his former White House chief Hamilton Jordan, assailing Reagan for not relating the facts of the Iran–Contra affair to the American people and predicted that various committees would conduct investigations "and it's all going to come out, which will be much more damaging to the institution of the Presidency than if the President had come out in the beginning."

In February 1987, while speaking to students, Carter differentiated his administration from Reagan's by saying his own did not adhere to demands from terrorists and it was a lesson the Reagan administration could learn. In March 1987, Carter traveled to Damascus, Syria, where he expressed his belief that the Reagan administration had not retained peace efforts in the Middle East. In September 1987, Carter announced his opposition to Supreme Court nominee Robert Bork over the latter's views on civil rights and associations in a letter to Senate Judiciary Committee Chairman Joe Biden. During a September 14 interview, Carter said the Iran-Contra Affair was of more seriousness than Watergate and the conflict has encouraged terrorists. In October 1987, Carter urged President Reagan to invoke the War Powers Resolution, arguing this would "help alleviate the worldwide belief" of Congress disapproving of the Persian Gulf's naval buildup. During an October 16 news conference, Carter said Reagan's policy in the Persian Gulf had been responsible for large increases in violence: "Almost inevitably and down through history, whenever a nation like ours injects itself into the military conflict or a civil war like in Lebanon or sectional war like between Iran and Iraq, we almost inevitably are destined to become involved as a belligerent."

=== 1988 presidential election ===
On March 19, 1987, Carter stated Vice President George H. W. Bush was the likely Republican nominee and ruled out that he would be a candidate himself during an appearance at the Egypt chapter of the American Chamber of Commerce. In June, after Senator Joe Biden announced his presidential campaign, Carter met with Biden as the latter visited the Carter Presidential Library. Carter admitted it would be hard not to endorse fellow Georgian Sam Nunn and his belief that Biden would have "good reception" in Georgia if Nunn did not run. On October 4, Carter stated Senator Paul Simon would be benefited by discussing his character and integrity and that following Reagan's tenure Americans would seek a candidate "who will tell them the truth and be competent and compassionate."

In June 1988, Carter met with Michael Dukakis in Boston; Dukakis said the meeting was pleasant and denied they discussed potential vice presidential candidates or future campaigning through the South by Dukakis. In July, tension broke out between Dukakis and fellow candidate Jesse Jackson over the selection of Lloyd Bentsen as the former's running mate, provoking concerns over a possible acrimonious national convention that would lessen the chances of a Democratic victory in November. Jackson suggested Carter as someone who could mediate the dispute and the former president expressed openness to the proposal. Dukakis campaign official Jack Corrigan responded that while they had "tremendous respect for President Carter", they believed direct communication would work better. As he toured the Omni Coliseum, Carter predicted Jackson would play a role in the decision making at the 1988 Democratic National Convention in a show of unity.

Carter addressed the Democratic National Convention, playing a much larger role than in 1984. Carter was less than enthusiastic about Dukakis, but nonetheless gave a speech praising him as well as his former Secretary of State Edmund Muskie. Carter also criticized Reagan's "wasteful" military spending. He spent little time on the campaign, partly out of a belief that Bush would win as he clung to Reagan's success and a desire to focus on his brother Billy after the latter's pancreatic cancer diagnosis. Carter tried to get his brother treatment at Walter Reed Army Medical Center. There was no cure and Billy died on September 26. On November 10, after Bush defeated Dukakis, Carter said the Republicans performed better than Democrats in marketing their candidates but stated President-elect Bush would have a more difficult time with lacking the popularity that President Reagan had.

=== George H. W. Bush term (1989–1993) ===
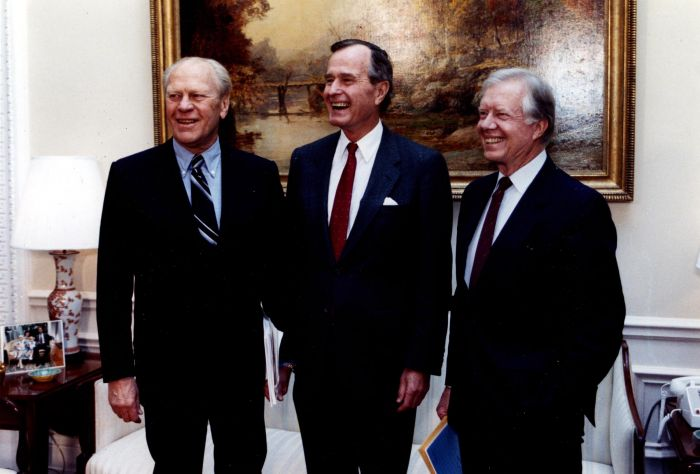
Former Presidents Carter and Ford with President-elect George H. W. Bush, 21 November 1988

In November 1988, Carter and Ford met with President-elect Bush to report their findings and state their support for a deficit-reduction plan combining higher levies on beer, wine, cigarettes and gasoline with domestic and military spending cuts to balance the federal budget by 1993. They urged the president-elect to renege on his pledge to not raise taxes and noted that while Bush had listened intently to their proposal, "he didn't make any promises or commitments and we didn't seek any."

On January 18, 1989, shortly before the inauguration of George H. W. Bush, Carter and Ford spoke informally at a symposium focused on presidential dealings with the press and participated in news conference at Columbia University, the two agreeing that President Reagan had enjoyed a press honeymoon that was not guaranteed to translate to his immediate successor when the latter took office, Carter adding that Reagan had gotten away with having fewer press conferences than his predecessors. Carter also stated his favoring of the policy by USA Today that barred unidentified sources being quoted in articles and advocated all media copy this pattern. In May, at the conclusion of Bush's first 100 days, Carter was asked about his performance. Carter admitted that as a Democrat he was "inclined to be critical, but compared to his predecessor he's done a rather beautiful job." In November 1989, Carter traveled to Washington for a reunion with two thousand members of his administration. In a speech at Georgetown University, Carter stated that if he had been president "for four more years, we wouldn't have had a resurgence of racism and selfishness" and the last administration was the first he could think of where the Attorney General "would go to court and take a stand against civil rights." Carter contrasted the relationship between the Carter Center and Bush, which he called "almost perfect", with the little support the organization received from Reagan. Carter praised Bush for his handling of the Chinese repression of students in the Tiananmen Square and criticized his response to the Soviet Union's initiatives.

On March 27, 1990, Carter met with President George H. W. Bush, United States Secretary of State James Baker, and National Security Advisor Brent Scowcroft in the Oval Office for a discussion on Carter's latest trip to the Middle East. Carter told reporters, "I believe that a comprehensive peace is both necessary and, I think, is inevitable. When it will come, remains to be seen."

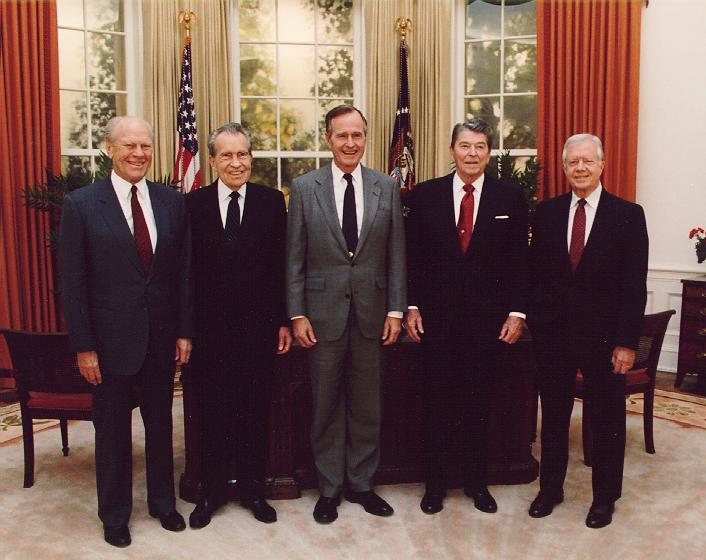
Carter (far right) in 1991 with President George H. W. Bush and former Presidents Gerald Ford, Richard Nixon, and Ronald Reagan at the dedication of the Ronald Reagan Presidential Library

As the Gulf War began, Carter praised Bush's initial handling of the conflict, but rejected arguments that jobs and oil were sufficient reasons to go to war, saying that he did not "believe that those are the kinds of reasons for us to sacrifice human life in the desert of Saudi Arabia and Iraq." In February 1991, Carter spoke to an audience at Purdue University, telling them that he hoped the United States would announce a cease-fire after crossing the Kuwait border and expressed his opposition to the US seeking to eliminate the Iraqi forces as he believed the strategy would result in a prolonged-war and larger casualties. Carter warned that bringing the war into Iraq could cause fervently religious Arabs to unite against the US, hoping that America and the Soviet Union should convene an international conference to resolve the Palestinian issue after the war's conclusion. Carter attended the November 4 dedication of the Ronald Reagan Presidential Library, the dedication ceremonies being the first time in United States history that five United States presidents gathered together in the same place: Nixon, Ford, Carter, Reagan himself, and Bush.

=== 1992 presidential election ===
On February 22, 1992, Carter met with Massachusetts Senator Paul Tsongas in Plains, Georgia, Carter advising Tsongas to have his allies in Massachusetts campaign for him with in-person appearances and thereby repeat the efforts of Carter's own supporters during his successful bid. Carter also stated that he would not make an endorsement ahead of the March 3 primary. On April 13, during a meeting in Tokyo, Japan, Carter told Prime Minister of Japan Kiichi Miyazawa that Governor of Arkansas Bill Clinton would be "very friendly toward Japan, and he will be a good president for the U.S.-Japan relationship." On May 20, Carter met with Clinton and afterward publicly praised him, labeling third-party candidate Ross Perot "right now as kind of, anybody-but-the-above". In August, Carter was joined by Democratic presidential nominee Clinton, vice presidential nominee Al Gore, and their wives Tipper Gore and Hillary Clinton in constructing a home for Habitat for Humanity in East Atlanta. Carter stated that he hoped the 1992 Republican National Convention had some discussion on the subject of assisting the poor before it concluded the following day and that he was not bothered by attacks against his presidency at the Democratic National Convention. During the month, Carter and Clinton spent a day campaigning together in Atlanta. After the election, Carter said he expected to be consulted by President-elect Clinton during his tenure and that he had advised him to form a bipartisan study group to address "most controversial issues".

=== First Clinton term (1993–1997) ===
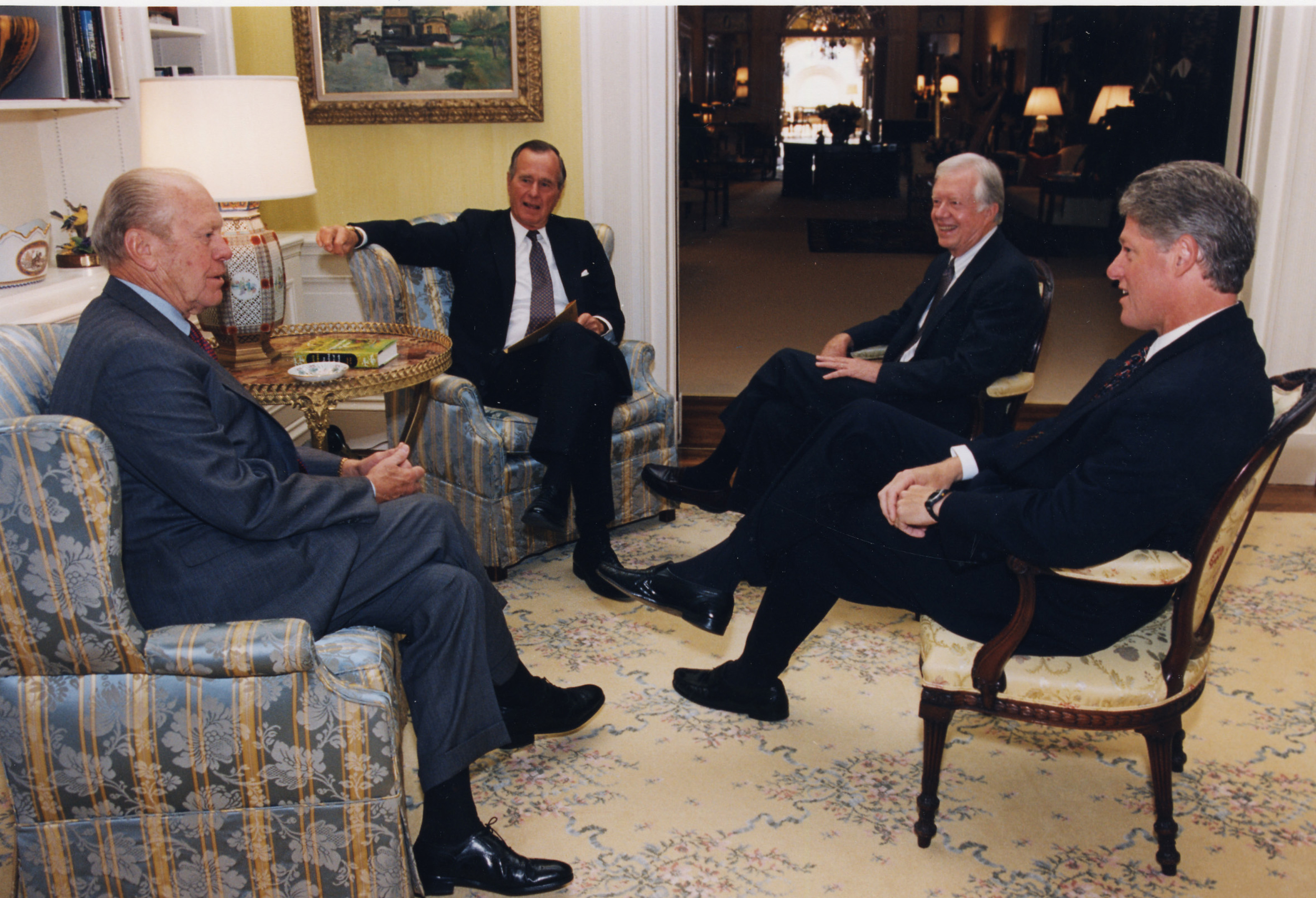
Former Presidents Ford, Bush, Carter meet with President Clinton, 14 September 1993

In September 1993, Carter and Bush appeared with President Clinton at a signing ceremony for the framework of a Middle East peace agreement between Israel and the Palestine Liberation Organization. Carter and Bush spent the night at the White House and were joined by Ford in attending a dinner hosted by Clinton. It was the first time a president had dinner with three former presidents in the White House. In October, U.N. Special Envoy Dante Caputo requested world leaders travel to Haiti as independent observers to both witness the region's legislative process and report its happenings to the world, specifically requesting Carter, Prime Minister of Canada Brian Mulroney, former Prime Minister of Jamaica Michael Manley, and former President of Argentina Raúl Alfonsín among other European and Latin American leaders. Clinton said he had only heard of the request that morning and would have to see what Carter's reaction was to comment further on the matter.

Carter attended the April 1994 funeral of former President Nixon with President Clinton, former Presidents Bush, Ford, Reagan and their wives.

Carter led a mission to Haiti in 1994 with Senator Sam Nunn and former chairman of the Joint Chiefs of Staff General Colin Powell to avert a US-led multinational invasion and restore to power Haiti's democratically elected president, Jean-Bertrand Aristide. After the trip, Carter met with Secretary of State Warren Christopher in Plains, a State Department official describing Christopher as having praised Carter "for his efforts to help negotiate the arrangements that allowed the U.S.-led force to land in Haiti without opposition."

In April 1995, as the ceasefire in Bosnia deteriorated, Carter confirmed he was in daily contact with the Clinton administration on Bosnia and willing to return but would need the approval of the Bosnian government.

==== North Korea ====
Starting in 1990, North Korea founder Kim Il Sung used representatives from his country to request Carter come to Pyongyang on the grounds of addressing the growing issue of "the DPRK's reprocessing of nuclear fuel rods removed from their antiquated power reactor". Aware of the former president's background in nuclear reactor design, they claimed to want to avoid a confrontation with the United States and other countries. In June 1994, the Carters and Marion V. Creekmore Jr. met with Ambassador Robert Gallucci for a three-hour briefing in which Gallucci told Carter that Clinton was committed to sanctions on North Korea due to their noncompliance with the Non-Proliferation Treaty. After weighing the consequences of going to North and South Korea as a representative of the Carter Center against the approval of his own government, Carter sent a letter to Clinton stating that he had decided to travel to Pyongyang and was approved by the president, who saw Carter as a way to let Kim Il-sung back down without losing face.

Leading up to the trip, the Carters met with National Security Adviser Anthony Lake, who the former president found to have little interest in spending "much time with us". The Carters arrived in Seoul and were greeted by James Laney. Laney gave an assessment for the reasons behind North Korea's policies. The Carters crossed the Panmunjom, the first persons permitted to cross the DMZ into Pyongyang since the 1953 armistice. The Carters stayed in a guesthouse adjacent to the Taedong River. Carter met with Kim Yong Nam, who took hardline responses to the former's proposals to end the impasse. Carter saw the North Koreans as not caring about the threat of sanctions, "except as a pending insult, branding North Korea as an outlaw nation and their revered leader as a liar and criminal." Carter met with Kim Il Sung, who he recalled as "eighty-two years old but vigorous, alert, and remarkably familiar with the issues", leaving Carter with no doubt that the North Korean leader was in full command of decision-making. Carter described his role, briefings, and visit with Kim Young Sam before making a presentation on North Korea nuclear policies. Kim Il Sung agreed to all of Carter's proposals with the requests that the United States back an acquisition of light water reactor technology by North Korea and a guarantee by the United States that there would be no nuclear attack on North Korea.

As Carter gave a CNN interview, he was informed that Tony Lake wanted to speak to him, Lake reporting to him that the other nations and the US had agreed to terms Carter had worked out. Carter went on a boat ride with Kim, the former's wife, and the CNN camera crew. Carter advocated for removing the remains of American soldiers buried during the Korean War, which Kim agreed to, and urged him to agree for a summit with South Korean President Kim Young-sam. Carter traveled from the DMZ to the American embassy in South Korea, where he learned of the negative reception in Washington to his actions. Carter spoke with Vice President Al Gore, who was opposed to him traveling to Washington. Carter went to Washington despite this, feeling "that either they did not understand what Kim and I had decided or their preference was some kind of further economic or military confrontation." After Carter held a press conference at the U.S. embassy to clarify that he was a private citizen not representing the federal government, Carter discovered an article from The Washington Post with negative quotes from Clinton administration officials about him.

Carter had a tense meeting with Bob Gallucci, Winston Lord, and Sandy Berger, informing the group that he was "well informed about the issues, not gullible, loyal to my president, and reasonably intelligent" before reading his trip report to them. The three all denied making the remarks themselves and claimed it was based on faulty information from Pyongyang, although Carter believed their comments were the result of their support for browbeating North Korea and seeking UN sanctions. President Clinton called Carter to tell him he was grateful for the trip and its results, and Carter quipped that he was the first in government to tell him this. Tony Lake then spoke to Carter to affirm his support for the former president's trip and deny he was behind the criticisms of him. Carter later sent Kim a letter enumerating the commitments made during their meeting and Kim confirmed their agreement. Carter called Clinton, who assured him that "there would be no need for sanctions" if the commitments were abided by. After Kim Il Sung's death in July, Kim Jong Il wrote Carter to confirm he would honor his father's commitments. The Agreed Framework was signed in October 1994.

Carter argued in his 2007 book Beyond the White House that the Carter Center's involvement in North Korea "was perhaps the most controversial and important of all its efforts."

=== 1996 presidential election ===
In 1996, Carter did not attend the Democratic National Convention. The media of the time speculated that this was because of the rough relationship between him and Bill Clinton, the incumbent president, and Democratic nominee.

=== Second Clinton term (1997–2001) ===
In September 1998, Carter gave his first public comments on the Lewinsky scandal in an address to Emory University students. Carter opined that Clinton "has not been truthful in the deposition given in the Paula Jones case or in the interrogation by the grand jury" and predicted the House would vote to impeach Clinton based on "the highly partisan alignment within the House of Representatives" but doubted the Senate would "marshal a two-thirds vote to remove President Clinton from office." Clinton was impeached by the House in December, and acquitted by the Senate in February 1999.

Carter played a key role in negotiation of the Nairobi Agreement in 1999 between Sudan and Uganda.

In March 1999, he visited Taiwan and met with President of Taiwan Lee Teng-hui. During his meeting with Lee, Carter praised the notable progress Taiwan made in democracy, human rights, economy, culture, science and technology.

In November 2000, Carter wrote an op-ed in The New York Times on HIV/AIDS in Africa at a time when AIDS overtook "malaria as the single leading cause of death on the continent, turning back the clock on hard-won gains in life expectancy achieved by many countries in recent decades." Carter called for heads of state and governments to address the gravity of the epidemic, for the African government and its international partners to work together to prevent new cases, and for broad partnerships between the Carter Center, Africa, and "national governments, volunteer health workers in villages, international and bilateral assistance agencies, foundations, other nongovernmental organizations and private corporations."

As the Clinton presidency neared its end, activists arranged for a letter to President Clinton urging him to declare a moratorium on federal executions before he left office. The Carters signed a separate letter in support of the activists, arguing the moral authority of the US would be diminished by a federal execution.

In 2001, Carter criticized President Bill Clinton's controversial pardon of Marc Rich, calling it "disgraceful" and suggesting that Rich's financial contributions to the Democratic Party were a factor in Clinton's action.

== 2000s and 2010s ==
=== 2000 presidential election ===
The 2000 Democratic National Convention gave Carter a prime-time tribute, the first convention to do this since he left the presidency. Carter's status as the first man from the Deep South elected president since Zachary Taylor in the 1848 election drew him closer to Vice President Gore, and the former president was closer to the incumbent vice president than he had been with the Clintons. On November 2, 2000, Carter endorsed Democratic nominee Gore, citing his character, and warned that Democratic voters turning away from Gore over minor differences could result in a repeat of Hubert Humphrey's loss in the 1968 election. In the turmoil following the presidential election, Carter stated his opinion that there should be a full recount by hand of all the votes in Florida. He suggested that a commission could propose this to both candidates, Gore and George W. Bush, and he stated that he would be willing to serve on such a commission.

=== First George W. Bush term (2001–2005) ===
In a July 2001 interview, Carter said of Bush, "I have been disappointed in almost everything he has done." Carter reflected that he had hoped after narrowly winning the 2000 election, Bush "would reach out to people of diverse views, not just Democrats and Republicans but others who had different points of view" and that Bush instead had "been very strictly conforming to some of the more conservative members of his administration" such as Dick Cheney and Donald Rumsfeld. Carter called for Bush to follow his father's policy of demanding Israeli settlements in the West Bank and Gaza be removed and to support the Kyoto protocol on global warming.

Carter visited Cuba in May 2002 and had full discussions with Fidel Castro and the Cuban government. He was allowed to address the Cuban public uncensored on national television and radio with a speech that he wrote and presented in Spanish. In the speech, he called on the US to end "an ineffective 43-year-old economic embargo" and on Castro to hold free elections, improve human rights, and allow greater civil liberties. He met with political dissidents; visited the AIDS sanitarium, a medical school, a biotech facility, an agricultural production cooperative, and a school for disabled children; and threw a pitch for an all-star baseball game in Havana. The visit made Carter the first President of the United States, in or out of office, to visit the island since the Cuban revolution of 1959.

In a March 2003 op-ed in The New York Times, Carter warned against the consequences of a war in Iraq and urged restraint in use of military force. On September 5, in Tokyo, Carter met with Prime Minister of Japan Junichiro Koizumi and said, in reference to North Korea's resuming of its nuclear program, "This paranoid nation and the United States now are facing what I believe to be the greatest threat in the world to regional and global peace." Later that month, Carter delivered a speech at the Woodrow Wilson International Center for Scholars where he referenced the Camp David Accords by insisting that it would be "impossible today for President Bush to go in immersion at Camp David with Israelis and Palestinians for 13 days to work out an agreement". Carter cited American involvement in Iraq, concerns over the nuclear designs of North Korea, the war on terror and nuclear arms proliferation as giving Bush "many foreign policy problems on his desk", concluding that a two-state solution would only happen after Israel "stopped its illegal settlement policies" and Arab countries recognized Israel's rights to exist and security.

In an October 2004 interview, Carter told The Guardian that the Iraq War was "a completely unjust adventure based on misleading statements" perpetuated by Bush and UK Prime Minister Tony Blair. Carter charged Bush with having exploited the September 11 attacks to elevate himself "in the consciousness of many Americans, to a heroic commander-in-chief, fighting a global threat against America" while also rebuking his "lack of effort" on the Israeli-Palestinian conflict and abandonment of nuclear non-proliferation initiatives undertaken by his predecessors. Carter attended the November 18 dedication of the Clinton Presidential Center with President Bush and former Presidents George H. W. Bush and Clinton.

==== Nobel Peace Prize ====
On October 11, 2002, the Norwegian Nobel Committee announced Carter as the winner of the Nobel Peace Prize, praising the former president's decades-long service of "untiring effort to find peaceful solutions to international conflicts, to advance democracy and human rights, and to promote economic and social development." Carter, who had been nominated for the prize multiple times prior, said that he was grateful for being chosen and that he believed "they've announced very clearly that the work of the Carter Center has been a wonderful contribution to the world for the last 20 years."

Palestinian Chief Negotiator Saeb Erekat recalled Carter's monitoring of the 1996 Palestine elections and called the former president "a man who has always stood for dialogue and for solving disputes through diplomacy and peaceful means, and not through the guns of war." Former Egypt Prime Minister Mustafa Khalil said that without Carter, "it would have been difficult to reach an agreement between Egypt and Israel. Mr. Carter played one of the most important roles in history in that agreement." Archbishop Desmond Tutu argued that the former president had "been a great deal more effective" since leaving office and President of Afghanistan Hamid Karzai, a fellow contender for the prize that year, admitted that Carter deserved it more than him.

Three sitting presidents, Theodore Roosevelt, Woodrow Wilson, and Barack Obama, have received the prize; Carter is unique in receiving the award for his actions after leaving the presidency. He is one of two Georgian laureates, along with Martin Luther King Jr.

==== Venezuela ====
Carter observed the Venezuela recall elections on August 15, 2004. European Union observers had declined to participate, saying too many restrictions were put on them by the Hugo Chávez administration. A record number of voters turned out to defeat the recall attempt with a 59 percent "no" vote. The Carter Center stated that the process "suffered from numerous irregularities," but said it did not observe or receive "evidence of fraud that would have changed the outcome of the vote".

On the afternoon of August 16, 2004, the day after the vote, Carter and Organization of American States (OAS) Secretary General César Gaviria gave a joint press conference in which they endorsed the preliminary results announced by the National Electoral Council. The monitors' findings "coincided with the partial returns announced today by the National Elections Council," said Carter, while Gaviria added that the OAS electoral observation mission's members had "found no element of fraud in the process." Directing his remarks at opposition figures who made claims of "widespread fraud" in the voting, Carter called on all Venezuelans to "accept the results and work together for the future".

A Penn, Schoen & Berland Associates (PSB) exit poll had predicted that Chávez would lose by 20 percent; when the election results showed him to have won by 20 percent, Douglas Schoen commented, "I think it was a massive fraud". US News & World Report offered an analysis of the polls, indicating "very good reason to believe that the [Penn, Schoen & Berland] exit poll had the result right, and that Chávez's election officials – and Carter and the American media – got it wrong." The exit poll and the Venezuela government's control of election machines became the basis of claims of election fraud. However an Associated Press report states that Penn, Schoen & Berland used volunteers from pro-recall organization Súmate for fieldwork, and its results contradicted five other opposition exit polls.

=== 2004 presidential election ===
Carter supported John Kerry and during an interview said of him, "I look on Kerry as one who has gotten through his lifetime of experience exactly what is needed in makeup and battleground and learning and determination, and his ideals to be the president we need now in this troubled time." Carter spoke at the 2004 Democratic National Convention.

=== Second George W. Bush term (2005–2009) ===
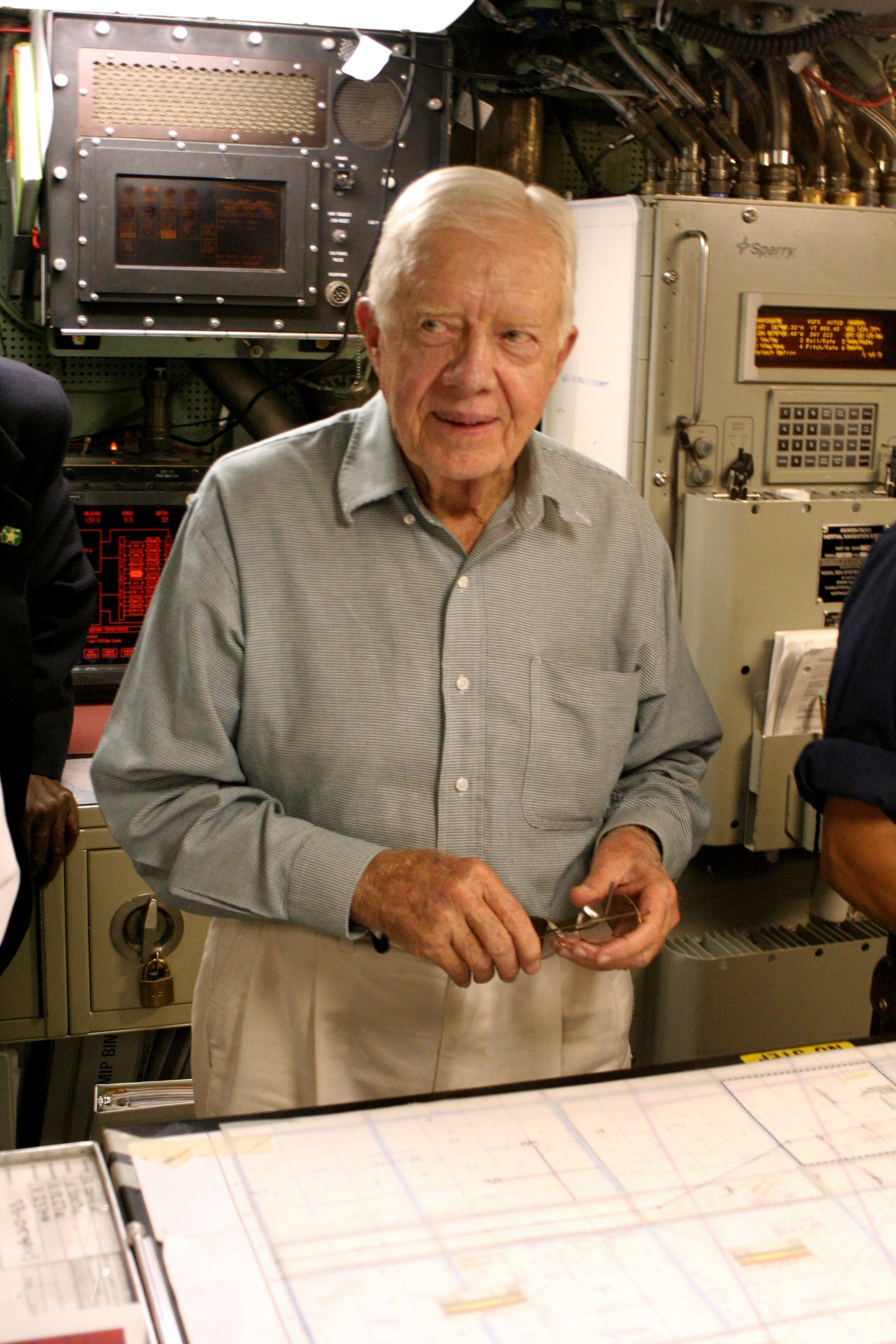
Carter looks over the navigation table in the control room of his namesake ship, 11 August 2005

Carter was not part of the American delegation to the April 2005 funeral of Pope John Paul II, which included President Bush and former Presidents Bush and Clinton. According to Peter Baker, the reason "touched off a classic Washington imbroglio fueled by suspicion, animosity and distrust, one that has reopened a rift between the camps of the former president and the current one." Carter Center spokesman Jon Moore said Carter declined going after learning that the Vatican had limited the number of delegation members to five and others were also "eager" to attend. White House Press Secretary Scott McClellan confirmed Carter declined attending after the White House reached out to him, saying they "would have been more than happy for him to be part of the delegation." In September, Carter criticized the response by the Federal Emergency Management Agency to Hurricane Katrina as "disgraceful" and said the US should focus on rebuilding New Orleans during an annual session at the Atlanta-based Carter Center.

In February 2006, Carter attended the funeral of Coretta Scott King. The Oklahoman criticized the remarks of Carter and Joseph Lowery, in which they rebuked President Bush, as "lacking grace" and wrote that the pair "chose the wrong time and place to make political statements." Later that year, Carter told Ron Claiborne that he thought "it was a horrible mistake to abandon Afghanistan and the war against al Qaeda and the effort to capture Osama bin Laden" to begin what he called an "unjustified war" in Iraq. While admitting his reluctance to critique Bush personally, Carter said the latter's administration "and particularly the vice president and the secretary of defense have, I think, quite often deliberately misled the American people about the danger in Iraq to begin with, the causes for going to war in Iraq, and they have also misled the American people about what is happening in Iraq since we invaded."

In April 2007, Speaker of the United States House of Representatives Nancy Pelosi traveled to Syria to open a dialogue with President Bashar al-Assad, a move the Bush administration opposed. Carter supported the trip, saying "the best way to help resolve the crisis is to deal with the people who are instrumental in the problem" and that her visit would not prevent the US from speaking to Syria with one voice. In a May interview with the Arkansas Democrat-Gazette, he said, "I think as far as the adverse impact on the nation around the world, this administration has been the worst in history," when it comes to foreign affairs. Two days after the quote was published, Carter told NBC's Today that the "worst in history" comment was "careless or misinterpreted," and that he "wasn't comparing this administration with other administrations back through history, but just with President Nixon's." The day after the "worst in history" comment was published, White House spokesman Tony Fratto said that Carter had become "increasingly irrelevant with these kinds of comments."

In October 2008, Carter attributed Bush's "atrocious economic policies" as the cause for the subprime mortgage crisis, specifically citing the president's "profligate spending" in addition to massive borrowing and dramatic tax cuts. Carter predicted it would "take years to correct what has been done economically", noting that the US had a budget surplus, low inflation and a stable economy before Bush's tenure.

==== The Elders ====
On July 18, 2007, Carter joined Nelson Mandela in Johannesburg, South Africa, to announce his participation in The Elders, a group of independent global leaders who work together on peace and human rights issues. The Elders work globally, on thematic as well as geographically specific subjects. The organization's priority issue areas include the Israeli–Palestinian conflict, the Korean Peninsula, Sudan, and South Sudan, sustainable development, and equality for girls and women.

Carter has been actively involved in the work of The Elders, participating in visits to Cyprus, the Korean Peninsula, and the Middle East, among others In October 2007, Carter toured Darfur with several of the Elders, including Desmond Tutu. Sudanese security prevented him from visiting a Darfuri tribal leader, leading to a heated exchange. He returned to Sudan with fellow Elder Lakhdar Brahimi in May 2012 as part of The Elders' efforts to encourage the presidents of Sudan and South Sudan to return to negotiations, and highlight the impact of the conflict on civilians.

In November 2008, President Carter, former UN Secretary General Kofi Annan, and Graça Machel, wife of Nelson Mandela, were stopped from entering Zimbabwe, to inspect the human rights situation, by President Robert Mugabe's government. The Elders instead made their assessment from South Africa, meeting with Zimbabwe- and South Africa-based leaders from politics, business, international organisations and civil society in Johannesburg.

In May 2016, The Elders announced Carter's retirement from his position in the organization. Elders Chair Kofi Annan praised Carter's contributions: "The Elders would not be the organisation it is today without his drive and vision, and he will stay an inspiration for all of us for many years ahead."

=== 2008 presidential election ===
In October 2007, Carter called for former Vice President Gore to run for president again, despite the latter's repeated insistences that he would not enter the race. Carter cited Gore as bringing "to the world's attention the serious problem of global warming" and that he hoped Gore's win of the Nobel Peace Prize would "encourage him to consider another political event."

In January 2008, during an interview with The Wall Street Journal, Carter praised Senator Barack Obama and the latter's presidential campaign, saying the Carter family and himself had been positively impacted by his candidacy and predicting Obama "will be almost automatically a healing factor in the animosity now that exists, that relates to our country and its government." In April, while in Abuja, Carter noted the support among Obama from those closest to him: "Don’t forget that Obama won in my state of Georgia. My town, which is home to 625 people, is for Obama, my children and their spouses are pro-Obama. My grandchildren are also pro-Obama." In a conversation with Jewish leaders, Obama criticized Carter for meeting with Hamas, insisting that the United States "must not negotiate with a terrorist group intent on Israel’s destruction. We should only sit down with Hamas if they renounce terrorism, recognize Israel’s right to exist and abide by past agreements." On May 25, Carter assessed that Senator Hillary Clinton would "give it up" after superdelegates voted following the conclusion of the June 3 primary. Due to his status as former president, Carter was a superdelegate to the 2008 Democratic National Convention. Carter announced his endorsement of Senator Barack Obama over Senator Hillary Clinton. Carter cautioned against Hillary Clinton being picked for the vice president slot on the ticket, saying "I think it would be the worst mistake that could be made. That would just accumulate the negative aspects of both candidates", citing opinion polls showing 50% of US voters with a negative view of Hillary Clinton.

In an August 2008 interview, Carter accused Republican presidential nominee John McCain of "milking every possible drop of advantage" in mentioning his status as a prisoner of war during the Vietnam War. McCain responded to Carter's comments during an appearance on Fox News: "I have great respect for former president Carter, but it's not first time we have disagreed. I don't think most Americans share that view. In fact, most of my supporters say talk more about your experiences, they were formative experiences."

=== First Obama term (2009–2013) ===
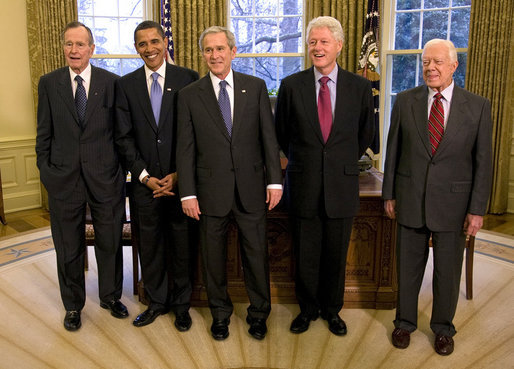
Former presidents Bush, Clinton, and Carter meet with President-elect Barack Obama and President George W. Bush in the Oval Office, 7 January 2009; Obama formally took office thirteen days later

In December 2008, former presidents Carter, Clinton, and Bush were announced as honorary co-chairs of the Obama inauguration, the inaugural committee describing the role as being filled by "prominent Americans from both sides of the aisle who have dedicated their lives to selfless service to their fellow citizens."

On January 28, 2009, a week after Obama's inauguration, Carter said he believed Obama would be "an outstanding president" during an interview with Charlie Rose. In September, Carter told Brian Williams that he believed "an overwhelming portion of the intensely demonstrated animosity toward President Barack Obama is based on the fact that he is a black man" and that inclinations of racism had "bubbled up to the surface because of the belief of many white people, not just in the South but around the country, that African-Americans are not qualified to lead this great country. It's an abominable circumstance, and it grieves me and concerns me very deeply." In response, White House Press Secretary Robert Gibbs espoused that Obama "does not think it is based on the color of his skin." Republican National Committee chairman Michael Steele called Carter's comments "flat out wrong. This isn’t about race. It is about policy." On November 18, Carter visited Vietnam to build houses for the poor. The one-week program, known as Jimmy and Rosalynn Carter Work Project 2009, built 32 houses in Dong Xa village, in the northern province of Hải Dương. The project launch was scheduled for November 14, according to the news source which quoted the Ministry of Foreign Affairs spokeswoman Nguyen Phuong Nga. Administered by the non-governmental and non-profit Habitat for Humanity International (HFHI), the annual program of 2009 would build and repair 166 homes in Vietnam and some other Asian countries with the support of nearly 3,000 volunteers around the world, the organization said on its website. HFHI has worked in Vietnam since 2001 to provide low-cost housing, water, and sanitation solutions for the poor. It has worked in provinces like Tiền Giang and Đồng Nai as well as Ho Chi Minh City.

In October 2010, Carter said Obama faced "an absence of any cooperation from the Republican Party" whereas he had bipartisan support during his own presidency. Carter predicted that after the 2010 elections, Obama would "still be president for two years, and I think he'll have a much more forceful presentation now that he's got, you know, a clearer picture of what the situation will be, and I believe he'll be successful." In November, Carter was supposed to meet with National Security Advisor Thomas E. Donilon when Obama requested Carter stop by for a visit. In a CBS interview, Carter stated that Obama "will be much more independent in fighting hard to prevail and not trying to reach out" in the next two years and that Republicans would "be responsible for a major element of the U.S. government" following their victory in the 2010 elections.

In March 2011, Carter traveled to Cuba, where they were received by Minister of Foreign Affairs Bruno Rodríguez Parrilla. The Carter Center described the trip as "a non-governmental mission at the invitation of the Cuban government" while some thought Carter's visit was meant to aid in securing the release of American contractor Alan Gross. Carter met with Gross, calling him "a man whom I believe to be innocent of any serious threat to the Cuban government or to the Cuban people". At the same conference, Carter stated his support for the US releasing the Cuban Five, opining that "the original circumstances of their trial" were dubious, and ending the United States's economic embargo on Cuba. On June 16, the 40th anniversary of Richard Nixon's official declaration of America's war on drugs, Carter wrote an op-ed in The New York Times urging the United States and the rest of the world to "Call Off the Global War on Drugs", explicitly endorsing the initiative released by the Global Commission on Drug Policy earlier that month and quoting a message he gave to Congress in 1977 saying that "[p]enalties against possession of a drug should not be more damaging to an individual than the use of the drug itself."

=== 2012 presidential election ===
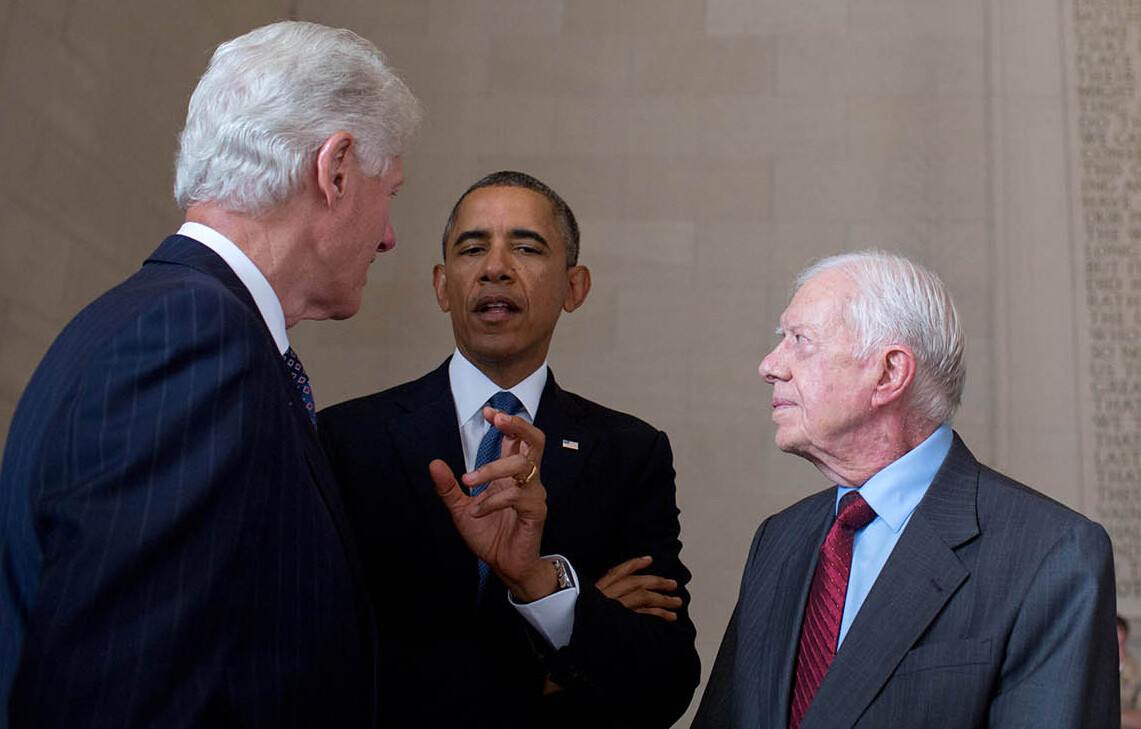
Former presidents Clinton and Carter, with President Obama at the 50th Anniversary of the March on Washington for Jobs and Freedom at the Lincoln Memorial, August 2013

Despite being a Democrat, Carter made the unusual decision to endorse former Massachusetts governor Mitt Romney in the Republican party 2012 Presidential primary in mid-September 2011, not because he supported Romney, but because he felt Obama's re-election bid would be strengthened in a race against Romney. Carter added that he thought Mitt Romney would lose in a match up against Obama and that he supported the president's re-election.

In an April 2012 interview, Carter admitted that he would rather have a Democrat in the White House, but that he would be comfortable with a Romney presidency because he thought "Romney has shown in the past – in his previous years as a moderate or progressive – that he was fairly competent as a governor and also running the Olympics." Romney repeatedly mentioned Carter on the campaign trail, hoping to invoke comparisons between the latter and Obama. In a series of appearances in May 2012, Romney said that "even Jimmy Carter would have given that order" when asked if he would have green-lighted the mission to kill Osama bin Laden and called Carter's presidency better for businesspeople than the Obama years have been. Carter addressed the Democratic National Convention in North Carolina by videotape, and did not attend the convention in person.

=== Second Obama term (2013–2017) ===
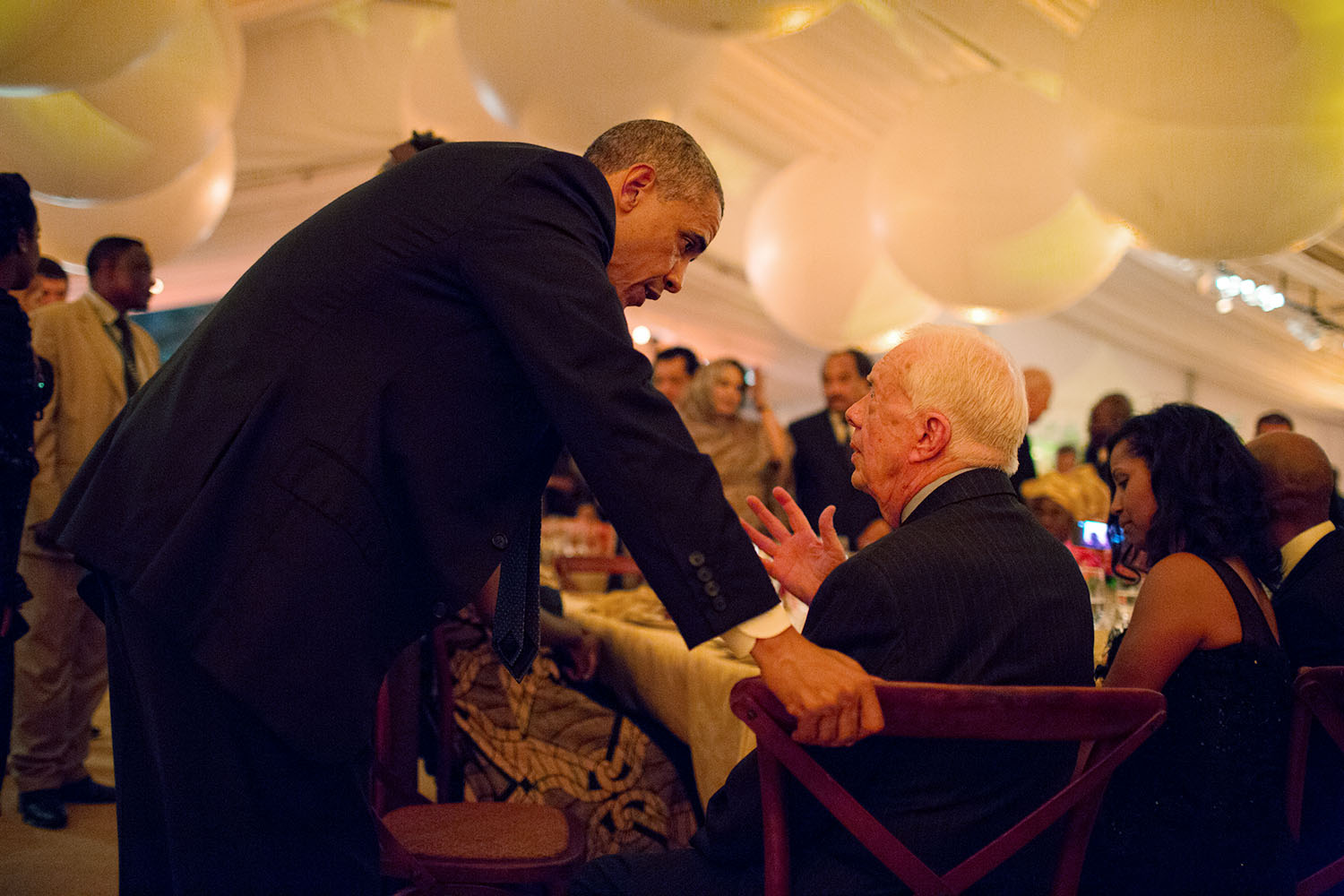
Obama talks with Carter during the U.S.-Africa Leaders Summit dinner on the South Lawn of the White House, Aug. 5, 2014.

In an early 2013 interview, Carter stated that while he had met with Obama early in the latter's administration, they "don’t really have any relationship" and that he wished they were closer. Carter added that Obama had not been able to accomplish much, attributing this to what he called "the “most uncooperative Congress" in history. In July, Carter expressed his criticism of current federal surveillance programs as disclosed by Edward Snowden indicating that "America has no functioning democracy at this moment." On August 28, Carter attended the Lincoln Memorial "Let Freedom Ring" ceremony commemorating the 50th anniversary of the March on Washington. Following Hurricane Sandy, Carter rebuilt homes in Union Beach as part of his affiliation with the Northeast Monmouth Habitat For Humanity, an area affected by the hurricane. As the 2013 United States federal government shutdown was underway, Carter stated that both parties in Washington needed to be flexible and the prospect of a government default would be a "tragedy unlike anything we've known financially in this country since the Founding Fathers created the Constitution." He admitted a short-term solution could merely delay another crisis and complimented Speaker of the House John Boehner as capable and courageous in spite of dealing with a difficult faction of his own party. Later that month, in an interview with Mark K. Updegrove, Carter said that Obama's major accomplishment was the Affordable Care Act, calling its implementation "questionable at best" and admitting that Obama has "done the best he could under the circumstances." Carter, as a former US president, was among past and present world leaders who attended the 2013 memorial service of Nelson Mandela in Johannesburg, South Africa.

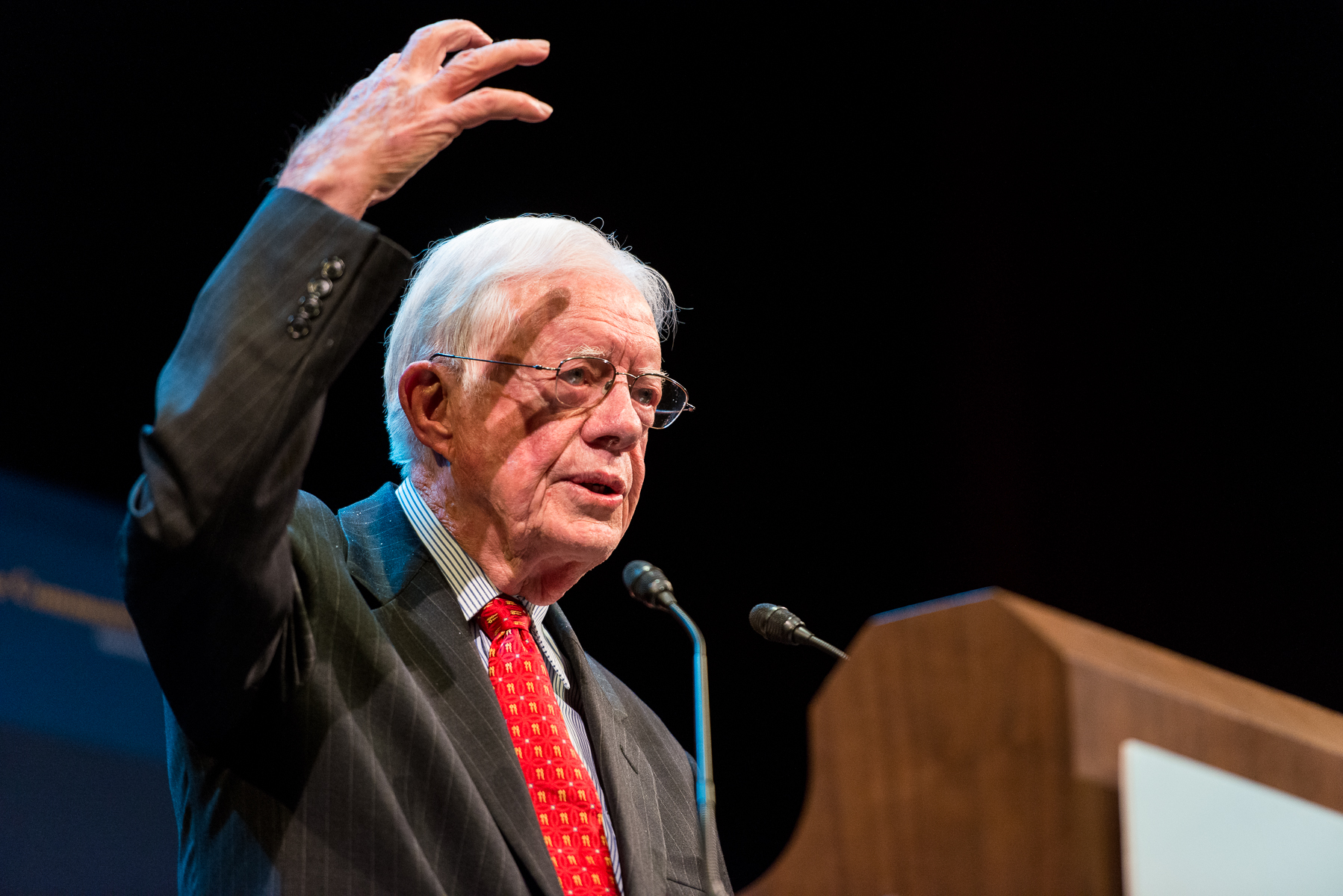
Carter in 2013

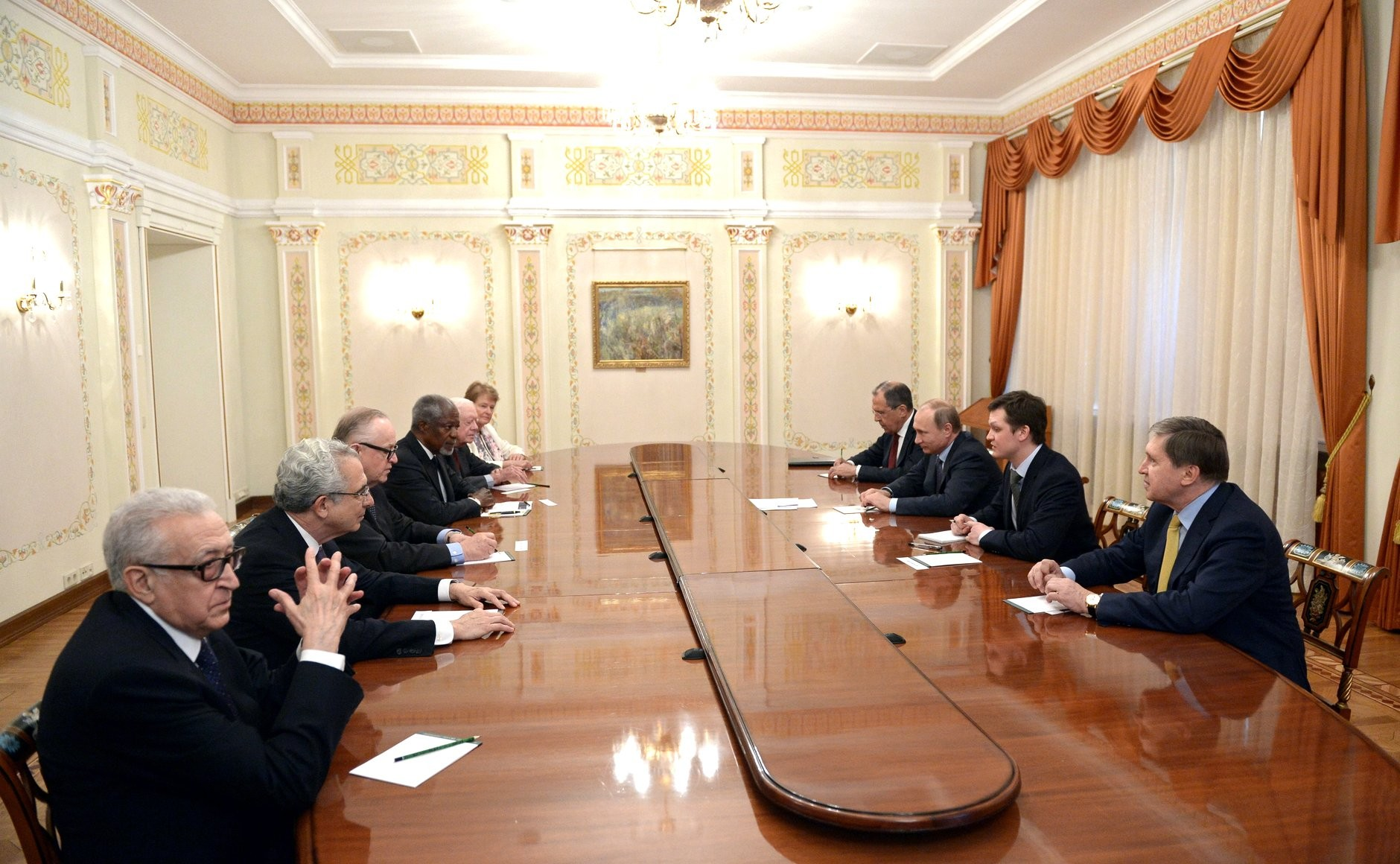
Carter and other members of The Elders with Russian President Vladimir Putin at his Novo-Ogaryovo residence outside Moscow, April 29, 2015

In March 2014, Carter reaffirmed his lack of relationship with Obama, noting to Andrea Mitchell that former Presidents Clinton, George W. Bush and Reagan had asked him for help when dealing with "unsavory characters" and speculating "the problem was that -- in dealing with the issue of peace in between Israel and Egypt -- the Carter Center has taken a very strong and public position of equal treatment between the Palestinians and the Israelis. And I think this was a sensitive area in which the president didn't want to be involved." During a phone interview a year after Hillary Clinton's tenure of secretary of state in the Obama administration ended and she was succeeded by John Kerry, Carter said, "In this occasion, when Secretary Clinton was Secretary of State, she took very little action to bring about peace. It was only John Kerry’s coming into office that reinitiated all these very important and crucial issues." In August 2014, Carter was joined by Mary Robinson during the 2014 Israel–Gaza conflict with the pair pressing for the inclusion of Hamas as an actor in peace talks with Israel, recognition of the group as a legitimate political entity, and the lifting of the siege of Gaza. The two Elders, in an op-ed article in Foreign Policy, noted the recent unity deal between Hamas and Fatah when Hamas agreed with the Palestinian Authority to denounce violence, recognize Israel and adhere to past agreements, saying it presented an opportunity. Carter and Robinson called on the UN Security Council to act on what they described as the inhumane conditions in Gaza, and mandate an end to the siege. In October, Carter stated that the United States "let the Islamic State build up its money, capability and strength and weapons while it was still in Syria" and a third of the territory in Iraq was abandoned after ISIS ventured into Iraq with no opposition from the Sunni Muslims. Carter broke with Obama further by stating there should be troops on the ground in Syria to help guide the air campaign and called the president's foreign policy lacking in "positive action."

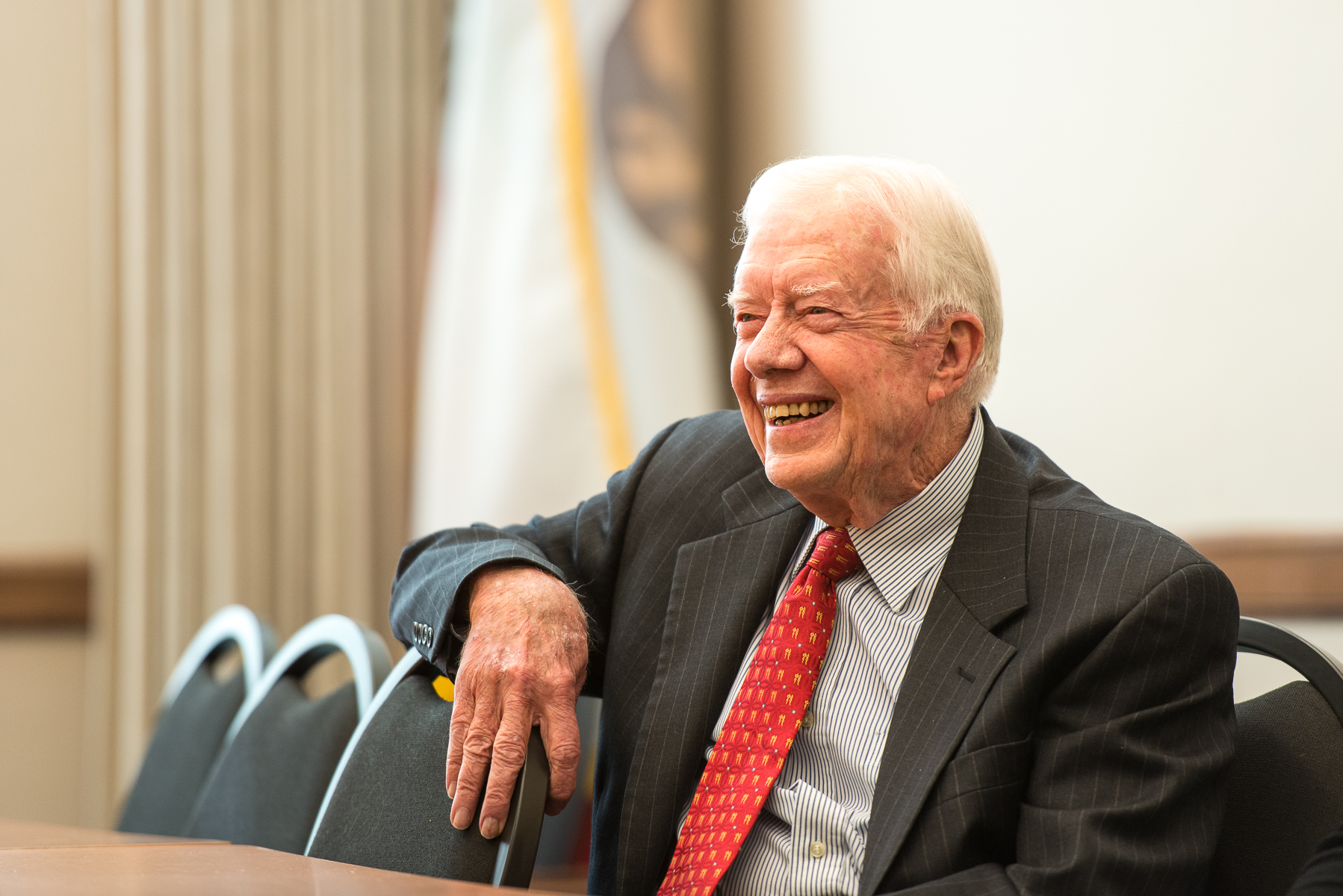
Carter in 2013 (sitting in the meeting room)

In July 2015, after Senator Bob Corker espoused that Iran had "fleeced" Secretary of State Kerry in negotiations over the Joint Comprehensive Plan of Action, Carter stated that he believed "Corker's comments were improper and a mistake" and that he was "wrong about the Iran nuclear deal, I think it's a very good one."

=== 2016 presidential election ===
On July 8, 2015, Carter said the statements made by Republican candidate Donald Trump on Mexican illegal immigrants were "very stupid" and "ill-advised". He predicted that while Trump would secure a small percentage of supporters in the primary, the latter was "a flash in the pan." In a November 1, 2015 interview, Carter noted the contrasts between his own experiences seeking the presidency and the current political climate: "I think it is different now in the nation. And I think it’s being caused by the fact that when people do get to Washington, quite often there’s a stalemate there and both parties kind of relish the fact that they don’t get along with the other side. It’s a different environment."

During a February 3, 2016 appearance at the House of Lords in London, Britain, Carter was asked whom he would support for the presidency between Trump and Ted Cruz, his main primary rival, Carter selecting Trump and explaining that he had "proven already that he's completely malleable. I don't think he has any fixed opinions that he would really go to the White House and fight for." During a May 23 interview, Carter said the Trump campaign had "tapped a waiting reservoir there of inherent racism." During his video message at the 2016 Democratic National Convention in July, Carter characterized Trump as seeming "to reject the most important moral and ethical principles on which our nation was founded."

In 2017, Carter disclosed that, in the 2016 Democratic primary for President, he had voted for Senator Bernie Sanders. In the general election, he voted for Hillary Clinton. During an interview, Carter stated he did not believe there had been Russian interference in determining the election results.

=== Trump term (2017–2021) ===
Carter attended Trump's inauguration, becoming, at age 92, the oldest president to attend an inauguration. On August 10, 2017, amid threats of weaponry by both North Korean and American leadership toward each other, Carter assessed the rhetoric as having "probably eliminated any chance of good faith peace talks between the United States and North Korea." In September 2017, in response to Hurricane Harvey, Carter wrote an op-ed for CNN in which he stated the virtuous side of Americans is demonstrated in the aftermath of disasters, and partnered with former Presidents George H. W. Bush, Bill Clinton, George W. Bush, and Barack Obama to work with One America Appeal to help the victims of Hurricane Harvey and Hurricane Irma in the Gulf Coast and Texas communities. Later that month, Carter said the publicity President Trump had brought to the Deferred Action for Childhood Arrivals program by giving Congress a six-month deadline to address the issue could result in comprehensive immigration reform not undertaken by both the Bush and Obama administrations while speaking to Emory University students. In October, Carter stated he believed President Trump was exacerbating racial divisions within the US due to his response to the U.S. national anthem protests, though possibly unknowingly, whilst stating he would rather see the players stand during the anthem. Speaking with Maureen Dowd that month, Carter stated his willingness to aid Trump with resolving growing tensions between the US and North Korea and confirmed he had notified National Security Advisor H. R. McMaster that he was open to serving as an American diplomatic envoy to North Korea.

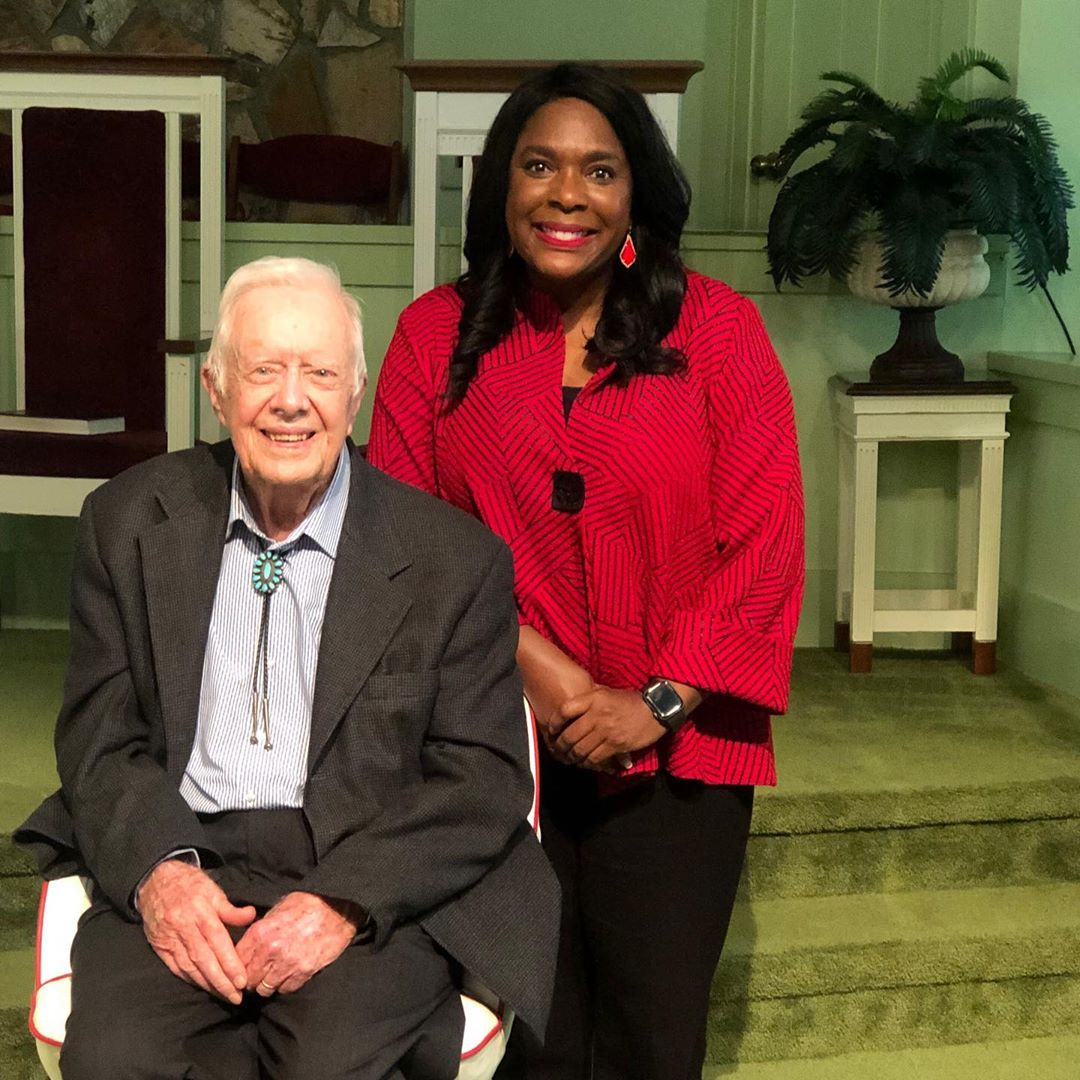
Carter with Terri Sewell in 2019

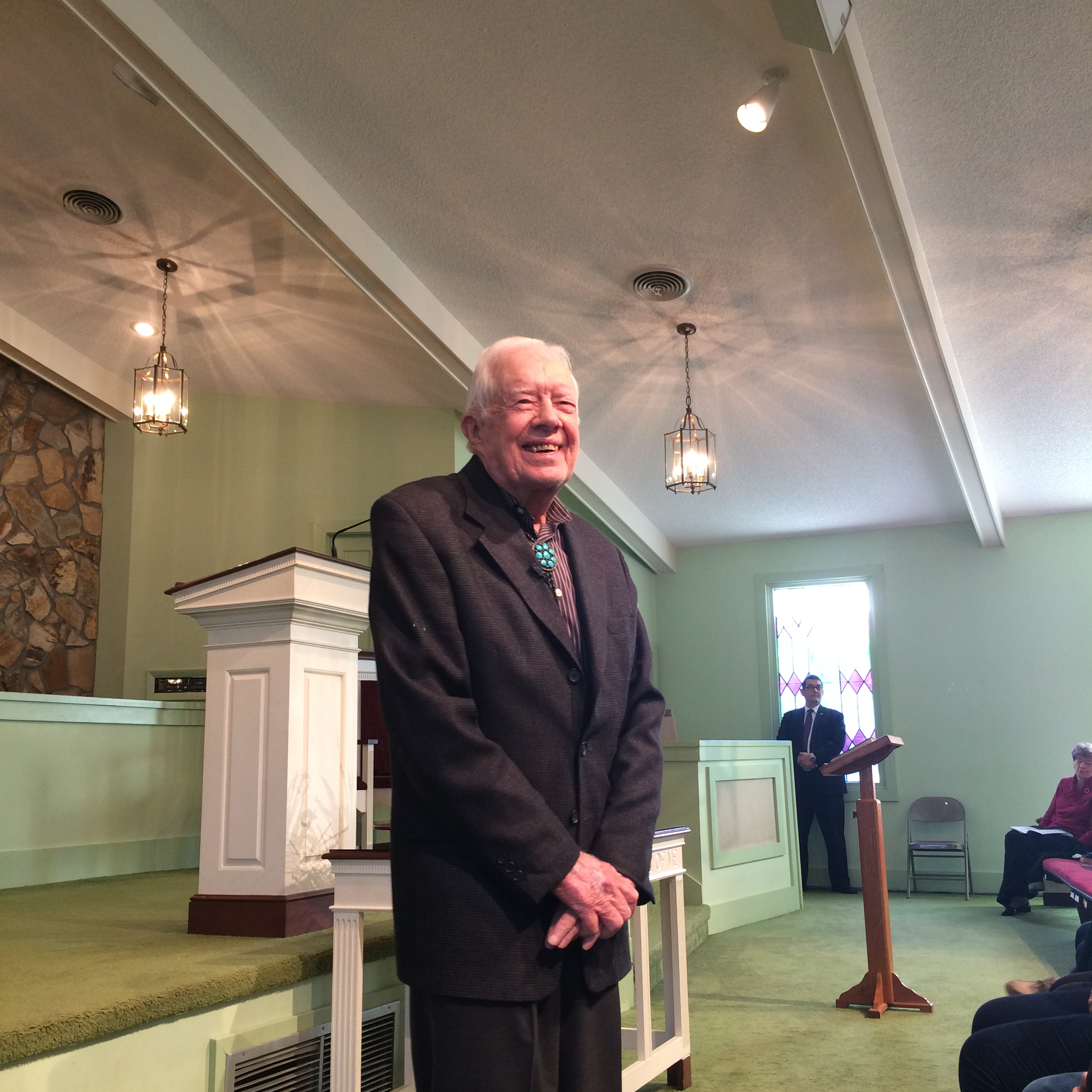
Carter in 2017

In March 2018, after President Trump agreed to a meeting with North Korea leader Kim Jong-un, Carter expressed his endorsement of the decision and said it would be "a wonderful achievement" if the US could avoid a nuclear confrontation with North Korea. Later that month, Carter stated his opposition to President Trump being impeached, believing that the oversight of both Congress and the Supreme Court was enough to keep him in check. Carter also expressed his belief that Trump wanted "to do a good job" and his willingness to assist him. In May, after Trump announced he was withdrawing from the Joint Comprehensive Plan of Action enacted by the Obama administration, Carter said the decision "may be the worst mistake Trump has made so far." Carter opined that an agreement signed by a president should be retained by his successors "unless the situation changes dramatically and it hasn’t changed" and the withdrawal "signals a message to North Korea that if the United States signs an agreement, it may or may not be honored." In November, after George H. W. Bush's death, Carter said the former's administration "was marked by grace, civility and social conscience" and that Bush had embraced "a uniquely American volunteer spirit and bipartisan support" through the Points of Light initiative. Carter attended Bush's funeral with all of the living former presidents.

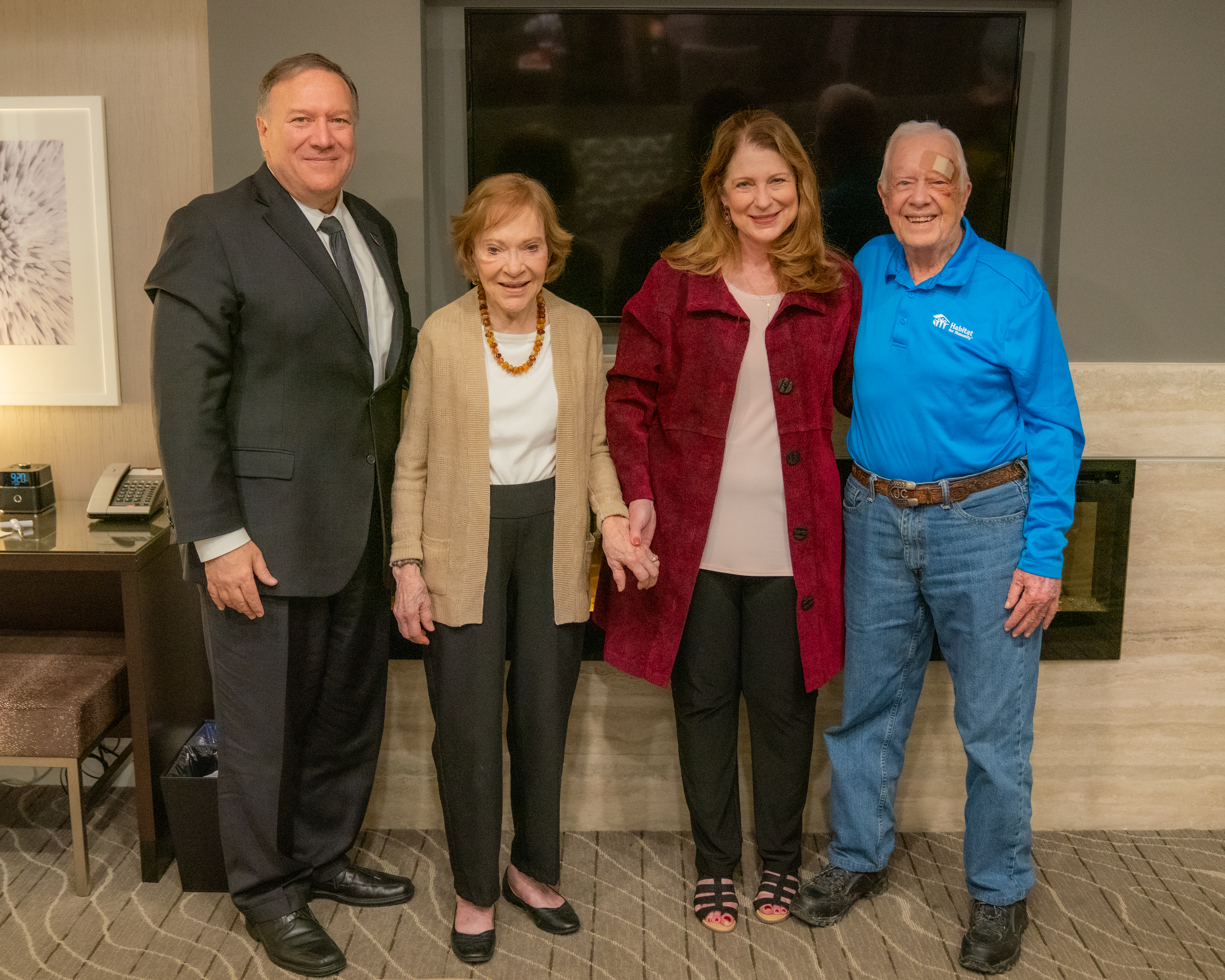
Carter with Secretary of State Mike Pompeo, October 2019

In January 2019, Trump claimed that he had received support from former presidents for building a wall along the U.S.-Mexico border and they had regretted not pursuing the same policy while incumbents. Carter was the last of the former presidents to deny this claim, releasing a statement confirming that he neither had spoken with Trump about the border wall nor supported the idea. In April, Carter received a phone call from Trump in which he expressed concern that China was "getting ahead" of the United States. Carter agreed, stating that China's strength came from their lack of involvement in armed conflict, calling the U.S. "the most warlike nation in the history of the world." In June, during a panel hosted by the Carter Center, Carter said that he believed "a full investigation would show that Trump didn’t actually win the election in 2016. He lost the election, and he was put into office because the Russians interfered on his behalf." Carter also called for Trump to condemn Russia for their meddling and acknowledge their interference. In October, as the Trump administration faced allegations that the president had abused his power to compel Ukraine to investigate Joe Biden, Carter told MSNBC that Trump was "stonewalling" by blocking witnesses and documents and warned that if facts "reveal an increasing number of things that he has actually done, then of course impeachment is possible and removal from office is possible."

In January 2020, after Trump unveiled his Middle East plan, Carter released a statement charging the plan with undercutting "prospects for a just peace between Israelis and Palestinian" and asserted it would doom the two-state solution. Carter advocated for the other member states of the UN "to adhere to UN Security Council resolutions and to reject any unilateral Israeli implementation of the proposal by grabbing more Palestinian land." In April 2020, after Trump announced the halting of funding of the World Health Organization to review its warnings about COVID-19 and China, Carter said he was "distressed" by this choice and called the WHO "the only international organization capable of leading the effort to control this virus." In June, as the United States experienced nationwide protests following the George Floyd, Carter released a statement calling for those in positions of power, privilege, and moral conscience to "stand up and say 'no more' to a racially discriminatory police and justice system, immoral economic disparities between whites and blacks, and government actions that undermine our unified democracy." Carter reflected on his 1971 inaugural address as Georgia governor in which he declared the time of racial discrimination had ended, lamenting that "with great sorrow and disappointment, I repeat those words today, nearly five decades later."

== 2020s ==
=== 2020 presidential election ===
In 2019 when asked about seeking non-consecutive second term and run in 2020, Carter commented that there should be an age limit for president, saying that he doesn't believe he could've handled the presidency at age 80. This was considered to discredit the 2020 Democratic frontrunners, who were ages 78 (Bernie Sanders), 70 (Elizabeth Warren), and 76 (Joe Biden, the eventual nominee). Carter was a late addition to speak at the 2020 Democratic National Convention, and endorsed Joe Biden in an audio message. On January 6, 2021, following the U.S. Capitol attack, along with the other three still living former presidents, Barack Obama, George W. Bush, and Bill Clinton, Jimmy Carter denounced the attack, releasing a statement saying that he and his wife were "troubled" by the events, also stating that what had occurred was "a national tragedy and is not who we are as a nation", and adding that "having observed elections in troubled democracies worldwide, I know that we the people can unite to walk back from this precipice to peacefully uphold the laws of our nation".

=== Biden term and final years (2021–2024) ===
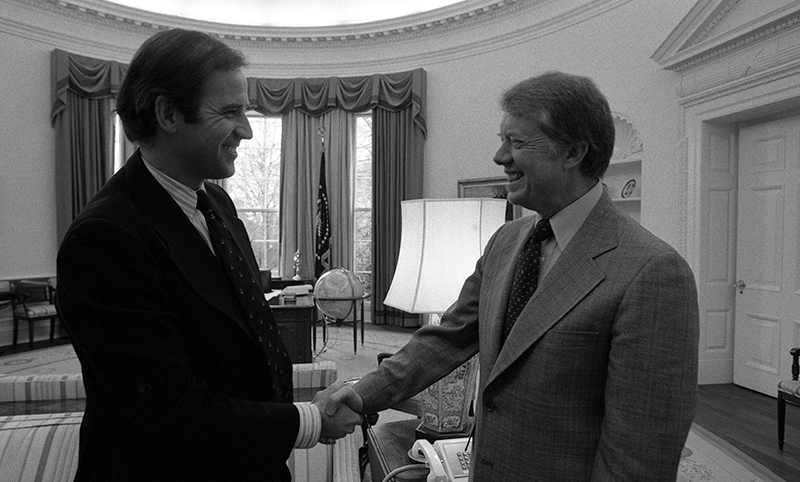
President Jimmy Carter with then-Senator and future president Joe Biden in 1978

Carter delivered a recorded audio message for the inauguration of Joe Biden on January 20, 2021, as the Carters were unable to attend the ceremony in person. President Biden also said that he spoke to Carter shortly before his inauguration. In April 2021, after the death of his former Vice President Mondale, Carter released a statement mourning his passing. Admitting that he considered Mondale "the best vice president in our country’s history", Carter credited him with using "his political skill and personal integrity to transform the vice presidency into a dynamic, policy-driven force that had never been seen before and still exists today." In late April, the Carters had an hour-long visit with the Bidens at the former couple's home in Plains. After the meeting, Biden said that he and Carter "sat and talked about the old days and he introduced me to a friend of his, a reverend he wanted me to get to know, and Rosalynn was great, too", reporting that the former president's health "has gotten better."

In February 2022, after Russia invaded Ukraine, Carter released a statement saying the invasion "violates international law and the fundamental human rights of the Ukrainian people" and condemned the "unjust assault on the sovereignty of Ukraine that threatens security in Europe and the entire world". He called for Putin to seek peace after halting military action and stated his support for the US and allies standing "with the people of Ukraine in support of their right to peace, security, and self-determination." In July, Carter and former Secretary of State James Baker wrote an op-ed in support of negotiations led by Senators Susan Collins and Joe Manchin aimed at reforming the Electoral Count Act. Carter and Baker wrote that the act was antiquated, possibly unconstitutional, and muddled after various attempts by lawmakers to mount challenges to the Electoral College votes in past elections and cited the need to alter the law as "too great for our elected leaders to get bogged down in the zero-sum game of politics that characterizes Washington today." In August, the Carters made a rare public appearance at the dedication of a giant butterfly statue to honor the former First Lady then-upcoming birthday by the Friends of the Carters organization. The couple spoke with attendees for an hour. In November, the U.S. Court of Appeals, Ninth District overruled a three-judge panel of the court and scheduled a rehearing of the case against the Trump administration-proposed land swap in Alaska to allow a road through the Izembek National Wildlife Refuge. In an unusual action, Carter had filed an opinion in support of the suit by environmental groups, saying the swap violated the Alaska National Interest Lands Conservation Act (Anilca) passed in 1980 near the end of Carter's term. Carter said the act "may be the most significant domestic achievement of my political life" at the time of his filing.

=== 2024 presidential election ===
In August 2024, following Biden's withdrawal from the presidential race, Carter endorsed Vice President Kamala Harris for president.

On August 1, 2024, it was announced by the Carter Center that there would be an event at Atlanta's Fox Theatre titled Jimmy Carter 100: A Celebration In Song, which is to commemorate Carter's 100th birthday. The event took place on September 17. Carter subsequently became the first U.S president to turn 100 on October 1, 2024.

89 days after turning 100, Carter died on December 29, 2024, at his home in Plains, Georgia.

== Middle East ==
=== Iran ===
In September 1981, Carter delivered a speech to prominent Japanese businessmen where he warned tensions in the Middle East cause oil supply disruptions to be "a constant threat". Carter then had an interview where he criticized Supreme Leader of Iran Ruhollah Khomeini: "He's unpredictable, weak in a time of crisis, he betrays his own followers and he has no loyalty to his subordinates." Carter also stated that he believed Khomeini's influence was "rapidly deteriorating" and called the Iran hostage crisis "the most painful and the most tortuous experience of my life, to have American hostages seized."

=== Israeli-Palestine conflict ===
==== 1980s and 1990s ====
During an August 9, 1981, ceremony honoring President of Egypt Anwar Sadat, Carter stated it was "time for all Palestinian leaders to forego the use of violence and to recognize Israel's right to exist in peace." He also said peace was still possible through Sadat but progress toward this endeavor had not been sustained in the aftermath of the Camp David Accords. In September 1981, Carter met with Prime Minister of Israel Menachem Begin at his home for discussions during which Carter claimed Begin said his country was now willing to accept proposals on the Palestinian autonomy advanced by the Carter administration the previous year. In October, after Sadat's assassination, Carter attended the latter's funeral and stated his belief that Sadat's successor Hosni Mubarak was dedicated to carrying out the "peace process initiated by President Sadat".

On September 23, 1982, after the Sabra and Shatila massacre, Carter told reporters that the killings had shown the importance of the Camp David Accords in stabilizing peace and that Prime Minister Begin had "made a terrible mistake in not demanding a complete investigation of this massacre of innocent people."

In March 1983, Carter underwent a weeklong visit to Egypt where he met with Palestine Liberation Organization members, stating during a subsequent March 8 press conference that he had traveled there as an Emory University professor and not to represent the US. Carter, Emory professor Kenneth Stein, and former Carter administration officials invited international persons from Saudi Arabia, Lebanon, Egypt, Jordan, Israel, and the Palestinian community in addition to representatives of the American government to the Carter Center "to assess proespects for peace between Israel and its neighbors." After the briefings, which yielded insights into what steps may need to taken in the future to address the complexities of the issues, Carter and Ford traveled to Washington to give briefings to congressional leaders and Reagan administration officials.

In March 1987, Carter conducted a private visit to Egypt, during which saying that Israel's failure to live up to the commitments made in the Camp David Accords contributed to the statelessness of the Palestinians.

In April 1990, Carter met with Yasir Arafat at the Hôtel de Crillon in Paris. Carter praised Arafat as having "done everything possible these last months to promote the peace process" and cited leaders who "don't adequately represent the concerns of the people - in Israel, among the Palestinians, the Syrians, the Jordanians, the Lebanese" as the hindrance to peace. Arafat said his meetings with Carter and President of France François Mitterrand had given "new impetus" to the peace process.

As the Madrid conference in 1991 was underway, and saw President George H. W. Bush and Secretary of State James Baker become active in the region, the Carter Center deferred to the federal government and reduced its direct involvement.

After the November 1995 assassination of Prime Minister Yitzhak Rabin, Carter said, "I just hope and pray that his legacy of courageous peace effort will not be disturbed, but will be carried on by many more Israelis than had given him support in the past." Carter attended Rabin's funeral with Clinton and former President Bush.

In December 1997, Carter said the election of Benjamin Netanyahu as Israeli Prime Minister "effectively terminated the Camp David Accord and Oslo Agreements", as he believed Netanyahu was not "committed to agreements made (on relations with the Palestinians), even though these have been effectively written into Israeli law."

==== 2000s ====
In 2003, Carter wrote an op-ed for The Washington Post marking the twenty-fifth anniversary of the Camp David Accords and assessing the current state of the Israeli-Palestine relationship. He noted that while a "calm and relative friendship" had developed after the Camp David Accords, the Oslo Accords, and the 1996 Palestinian general election that saw the election of Yasser Arafat, "radical and violent actions subsequently intruded, exemplified by the assassinations of Sadat and of Israeli Prime Minister Yitzhak Rabin and by the unconscionable suicide bombings and other violence that continue today." Carter concludes by asking if the American government wants "permanent peace with all our neighbors" or retaining "our settlements in the occupied territories of the Palestinians", opining that the second choice would be America's worst betrayal of Israel.

In 2006, at the UK Hay Festival, Carter stated that Israel had at least 150 nuclear weapons. He expressed his support for Israel as a country, but criticized its domestic and foreign policy; "One of the greatest human rights crimes on earth is the starvation and imprisonment of 1.6m Palestinians," said Carter. In December of that year, during an interview, Carter said, "When Israel does occupy this territory deep within the West Bank, and connects the 200-or-so settlements with each other, with a road, and then prohibits the Palestinians from using that road, or in many cases even crossing the road, this perpetrates even worse instances of apartness, or apartheid, than we witnessed even in South Africa."

He mentioned statistics showing the nutritional intake of some Palestinian children was below that of the children of Sub-Saharan Africa and described the European position on Israel as "supine".

In May 2007, while arguing that the United States should directly talk to Iran, Carter again stated that Israel had 150 nuclear weapons in its arsenal.

==== 2010s and 2020s ====
In March 2010, Carter participated in the Malta Forum in Atlanta, where he stated his hopes for the US to assume a more "balanced" position in relations with Israel and that there would need to be a "dramatic change" in Israeli policy for diplomacy to solve the conflict. In October, in his capacity as a member of The Elders, Carter traveled with former President of Ireland Mary Robinson and union leader Ela Bhatt on a week-long tour of the Middle East. Carter addressed protestors against the Israeli eviction of Palestinians from the neighborhood of Sheikh Jarrah, saying in support of them, "I don't think anyone would ever claim that the demolition of someone's home or the confiscation a home in which a family has lived for many generations is fair, or just, or peaceful." Carter also declared East Jerusalem as part of Palestine and called his visit to the region an effort "to promote peace between Israelis and Palestinians and to make sure the occupation is soon ended."

In May 2012, The Elders traveled to Israel, the occupied West Bank, and Egypt. At a news conference, Carter said the group were concerned with "this move towards this catastrophic so-called one-state choice" and that every indication inferred "that this two-state solution has basically been abandoned and we’ve had a moving forward towards a ‘greater Israel’ which I think is contrary to the two-state solution concept." In October, The Elders met with President of Israel Shimon Peres and Palestinian leader Mahmoud Abbas. Carter said the Israeli-Palestinian conflict had "reached a crisis stage" and reported that the delegation was concerned about divisions between Palestinian parties Fatah and Hamas and affirmed their support for a state status bid for Palestine at the United Nations General Assembly.

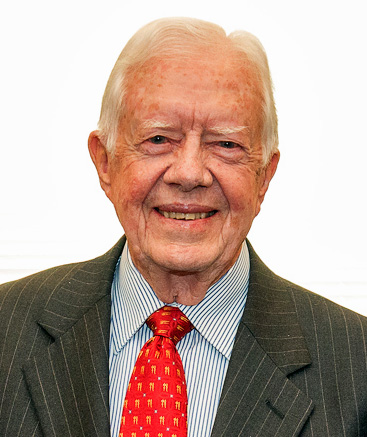
Carter in 2013

In April 2013, Carter received the International Advocate for Peace Award from Journal of Conflict Resolution, a group of Benjamin N. Cardozo School of Law students who cited the former president's role in brokering the Camp David Accords and the SALT II nuclear weapons treaty as their rationale for awarding him. The reward drew controversy from alumni who took issue with a Jewish school awarding an Israel critic. Yeshiva University President Richard Joel stated that while the university staff did not agree with Carter's views on Israel, the school supported expression of differing views and the right of students to invite the former president. In July, Carter traveled to London with Lakhdar Brahimi and President of Finland Martti Ahtisaari to put momentum behind the two-state solution, Carter saying that he welcomed the effort with "great pleasure." The visit came as British envoy Mark Lyall Grant vowed his government would do everything in its power to support the two-state solution and called for unification behind the goal of creating a scenario "where a safe and secure Israel can live in peace with an independent and viable Palestinian state."

In May 2015, Carter participated in a news conference with former Prime Minister of Norway Gro Harlem Brundtland. Carter stated that he did not believe Netanyahu "desires to have the same goal achieved that all American presidents and secretaries of state have advocated, and that is a two-state solution." Carter recalled Netanyahu's declaration that there would be no two-state solution as long as he was prime minister and cited this as the reason Secretary of State Kerry's efforts to get both parties to negotiate had been unsuccessful.

In November 2016, Carter wrote an op-ed for The New York Times praising Obama for his support of a negotiation to conclude the Israeli-Palestine conflict, but advocated that the one significant step the Obama administration "must take before its term expires on Jan. 20 is to grant American diplomatic recognition to the state of Palestine." Carter also called for the UN Security Council to pass a resolution specifying rules to end the conflict and wrote that this proposed resolution "should reaffirm the illegality of all Israeli settlements beyond the 1967 borders, while leaving open the possibility that the parties could negotiate modifications."

In May 2019, in an interview with Israeli journalist Tali Lipkin Shahak, Carter said he did not believe either Netanyahu or President of the Palestinian National Authority Mahmoud Abbas wanted peace and there was not "a trusted mediator who can bridge the gap and secure the step-by-step small concessions that are necessary for accommodation." Carter confirmed he had spoken with President Trump's son-in-law Jared Kushner "about the Middle East and urged him to be aggressive and flexible as well, and to reach out to the Palestinians as well as to the Israelis and the Arab leaders. And he promised me that he would, but I’m not sure that’s been done."

In 2020, Prime Minister Netanyahu gave a July 1 deadline for plans for annexation with the Trump administration offering Israel roughly 30 percent of the West Bank and all of the Jordan Valley to control. Carter and Carter Center CEO Paige Alexander issued a joint statement rebuking the annexation as amounting "to a massive, illegal expropriation of Palestinian territory" and called for the Israelis and Palestinians to "return to meaningful negotiations based on U.N. resolutions and previous bilateral agreements." The pair also said the planned annexation would violate "international laws prohibiting the acquisition of territory by force and changing the status of occupied territories" and go against the rules of the Oslo and Camp David Accords.

=== Syria ===
In March 1983, Carter participated in a two-hour lunch with President of Syria Hafez al-Assad. When asked if he agreed with the assessment of United States Secretary of Defense Caspar Weinberger that the installation of Soviet-operated missiles inside Syria had turned Syria into just "another outpost of the Soviet empire", Carter noted that Syria was developing "a major weapons system" and opined that "Assad is totally dedicated to independence from domination by any country. I certainly don't consider Syria a puppet. That is a ridiculous proposition."

In March 1990, Carter traveled to Damascus and met with Assad and Minister of Foreign Affairs Farouk al-Sharaa. Carter held a press conference on the fifth anniversary of the kidnapping of American journalist Terry A. Anderson and stated that the Syrian officials assured him they would do everything they could to aid in solving the Lebanon hostage crisis.

In April 2008, the London-based Arabic newspaper Al-Hayat reported that Carter met with exiled Hamas leader Khaled Mashal on his visit to Syria. The Carter Center initially neither confirmed nor denied the story. The US State Department considers Hamas a terrorist organization. Within this Mid-East trip, Carter also laid a wreath on the grave of Yasser Arafat in Ramallah on April 14, 2008. Carter said on April 23 that neither Condoleezza Rice nor anyone else in the State Department had warned him against meeting with Hamas leaders during his trip. Carter spoke to Mashal on several matters, including "formulas for prisoner exchange to obtain the release of Corporal Shalit."

In December 2008, Carter visited Damascus again, where he met with Syrian President Bashar al-Assad, and the Hamas leadership. During his visit he gave an exclusive interview to Forward Magazine, the first ever interview for any American president, current or former, with a Syrian media outlet.

In April 2009, Carter told the Associated Press that he believed both the United States and Syrian governments had a goal "to re-establish diplomatic relations when it's propitious to do so".

In August 2013, as the United Nations investigated possible chemical weapons attacks in Syria, Carter released a statement saying that those responsible for the attack should bear "personal responsibility" and that the attack "should be a catalyst for redoubling efforts to convene a peace conference, to end hostilities, and urgently to find a political solution."

=== Egypt ===
During a June 20, 2012 phone call with Jeffrey Brown, Carter stressed Egyptian military generals could be granted full power executively and legislatively in addition to being able to form a new constitution in favor of themselves in the event their announced intentions went through; Carter expressing distaste with the plan: "I hope it doesn’t go through and that the United States and others will speak out strongly enough to have influence on the military to control and to carry out the promises that they made to me and to the Egyptian people and to the international community."

In May 2014, Carter issued a statement saying he was "gravely concerned that Egypt's democratic transition has faltered" and called for the next President of Egypt "to ensure the full spectrum of Egyptian society can participate meaningfully in politics". In October 2014, after the Carter Center closed its office in Egypt, Carter explained the decision as resulting from Egypt's current environment being "not conducive to genuine democratic elections and civic participation."

== Georgia matters ==
In November 1984, Carter and Jesse Jackson delivered eulogies at the funeral of Martin Luther King Sr. in the Morehouse College Chapel.

In December 1988, Carter participated in an interview at the Carter Presidential Center where he spoke of the possibility of forming an organization aimed at ending international civil wars, noting that the United Nations had found twenty-five civil wars around the world but had no authority to get involved in mediating any of them. Carter confirmed he had met with Secretary-General of the United Nations Javier Pérez de Cuéllar and leaders of the Organization of American States and the British Commonwealth on creating an organization which he asserted would receive funding from the Carnegie Institution for Science and from sources in Japan and Sweden.

On October 25, 1991, Carter announced he was undertaking a program to address the needs of the poor in Atlanta, citing a desire "to make sure that if we try something out in Atlanta that has a potential of success or proves to be successful, that it's instantly shared with other cities."

In 1993, Carter partnered with Michael Jackson for an Atlanta Project campaign to immunize thousands of preschool children within six weeks. Carter called America "a third-world country as far as the attention we give our own children" and noted "that in this whole country among African-Americans, we have an infant mortality rate of 18 per 1,000 babies born. There are a lot of third-world countries that have lower infant mortality rates than we do among our African-American neighbors."

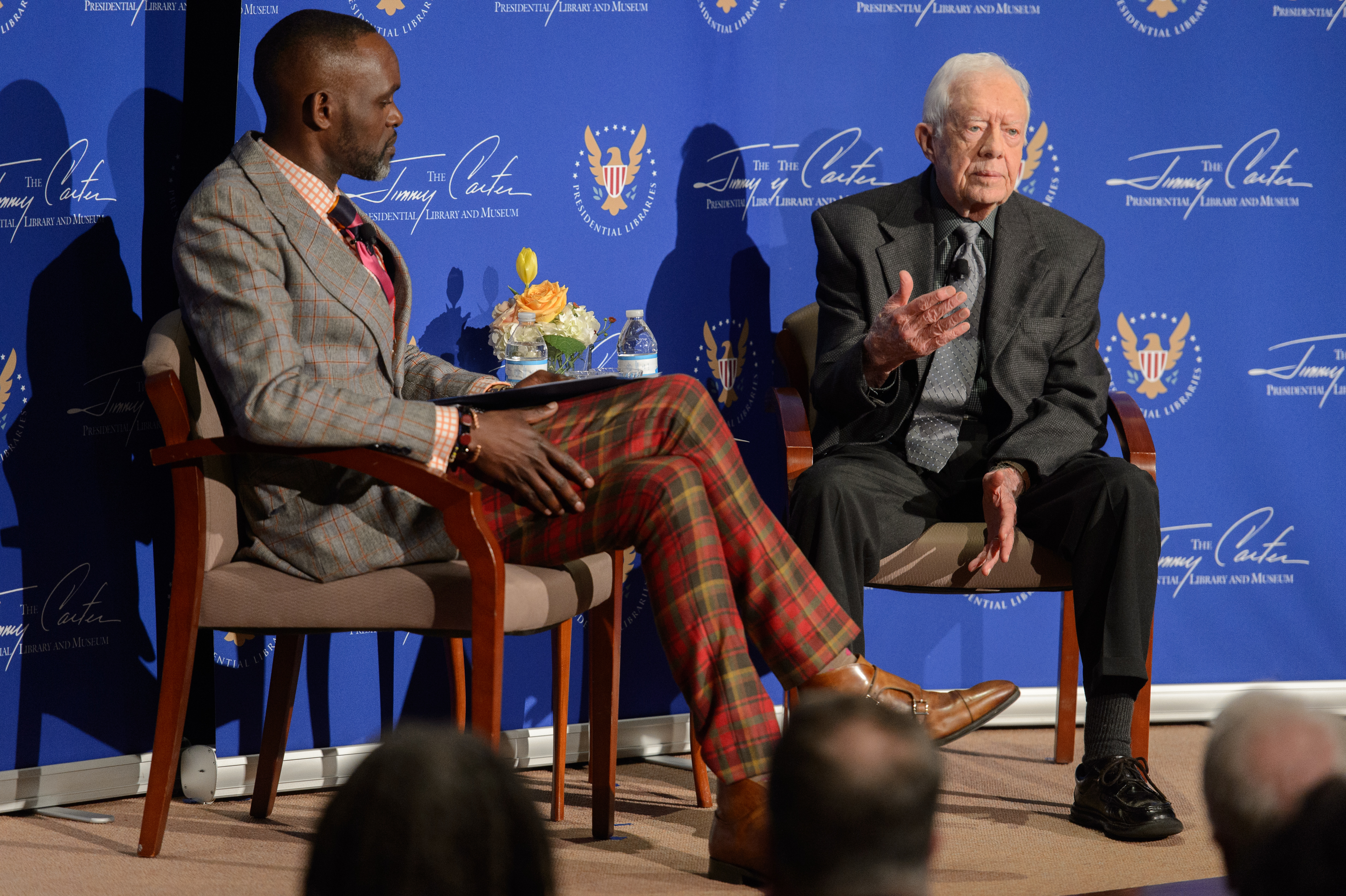
Carter and CEO of the National Civil and Human Rights Center Derreck Kayongo at the Carter Library, 20 May 2016

In February 2016, months after Carter announced he had taken treatment that eliminated all signs of his cancer, the Georgia House passed House Bill 965, which blocked insurance companies offering health care plans in Georgia from "forcing patients to first fail to respond to treatments before trying other programs", the legislation only applying to health plans providing coverage for the treatment of advanced, metastatic cancer. State Rep. Mike Cheokas said the former president's cancer battle inspired the legislation and dubbed the bill "the Honorable Jimmy Carter Cancer Treatment Access Act".

In March 2018, Carter joined former presidents George W. Bush and Clinton at the funeral of former Georgia Governor Zell Miller at Peachtree Road United Methodist Church. In the 2018 gubernatorial race, Carter was the third U.S. president to endorse Stacey Abrams, calling her "the right leader for our changing state who has consistently championed the American values we share: equality for all, excellent public schools for our children, and an economy where families from Plains to Plainville and Pooler have the opportunity to get ahead." Ryan Mahoney, the spokesman for Brian Kemp (Abram's competitor) called Carter a good man but "a terrible president" and compared Abrams to Carter in being "incredibly bright, incredibly liberal and would be an absolutely horrible governor." Carter appeared with Abrams in his hometown of Plains to address supporting "rural medical facilities and rural healthcare professionals across Georgia."

In March 2021, after the Georgia state senate voted for legislation ending no-excuse absentee voting and requiring ID from absentee voters, Carter said states attempting to safeguard election integrity "should not be at the expense of voters’ access to the polls" and added that he was "disheartened, saddened, and angry" as state legislators were trying "to turn back the clock" and make it more difficult for Georgians to vote.

== Relations and work with Gerald Ford ==
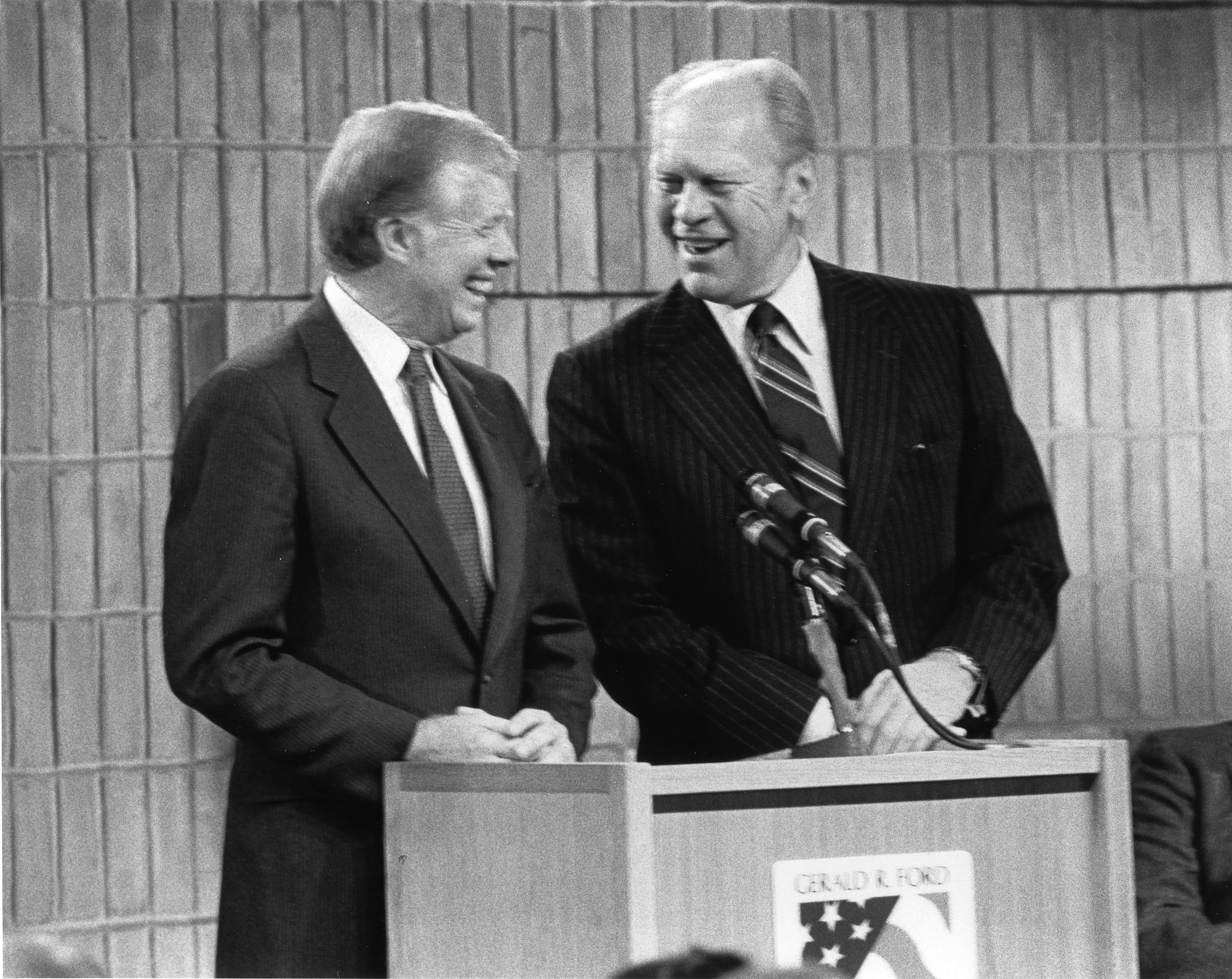
Former Presidents Jimmy Carter and Gerald R. Ford co-host an All-Democracies Conference, 9 February 1983

Carter ended up forming a close friendship with Gerald Ford after they had both left office, with the catalyst being their trip together to the funeral of Anwar el-Sadat in 1981. Shortly after Carter left office, Ford had publicly called for him to use his retirement to stay busy and conduct "activities that'll give him a chance to make observations, maybe some criticism." Until Ford's death, Carter and his wife, Rosalynn, visited the Fords' home frequently. In September 1983, Carter and Ford were commentators at a voting symposium sponsored by ABC News and Harvard University. Carter recalled his attempts to enact legislation that would permit registration on Election Day, only for Congress to block it in order to prevent "unpredictable new voters registered." In January 1984, a letter signed by Carter and Ford and urging world leaders to extend their failed effort to end world hunger was released and sent to Secretary-General of the United Nations Javier Pérez de Cuéllar. Three months later, Ford and Carter agreed to collaborate on assessing the status of nuclear arms control. They hosted a conference at Emory the following year, inviting representatives from countries that acknowledged their nuclear armaments. According to Carter, the objective of the former presidents "was to understand and then publicize a current analysis of international agreements, the degree of compliance with them, and recommendations for additional action."

In 1988, Carter and Ford created American Agenda, a group charged with producing options papers on the most important concerns that the next President would face. Carter said that he and Ford "have had a very good working relationship since I left the White House, as well as a friendship" and that the pair "thought it would be beneficial to have a bipartisan commission prepare for the President-elect a list of options on a number of issues." The former presidents confirmed they had been in contact with Michael Dukakis, Jesse Jackson, and George H. W. Bush, the remaining candidates in the 1988 presidential election at the time. In May 1989, Carter and Ford traveled to Panama alongside a delegation for the monitoring of elections within the country to ensure they were, as Carter stated during a press conference, "free and fair".

Ford and Carter served as honorary co-chairs of the National Commission on Federal Election Reform in 2001 and of the Continuity of Government Commission in 2002. For the latter commission, Carter served from 2003 to 2011 (he was co-chair with Ford until the latter's death). The Commission recommended improvements to continuity of government measures for the federal government. Carter spoke at Ford's funeral in late 2006, delivering remarks on Ford's accomplishments in office and their friendship, calling the latter one of the greatest gifts he had.

== Author ==
For Carter, writing books was both a creative pursuit and a major source of income. Unlike other former presidents, he did not take on a corporate board position or charge fees for speeches. According to Jonathan Alter, who wrote a biography on Carter in 2020, Carter was "very proud of his writing and proud he could be productive enough to make a living at it." In 2018, it was announced that Carter would write a book with Jerry Falwell, Jr. on religion. According to Falwell, Carter met with him in Lynchburg to discuss the collaboration, but the latter's health and the COVID-19 pandemic got in the way of progress on the project.

=== Palestine: Peace Not Apartheid ===
In a 2007 speech to Brandeis University, Carter stated: "I have spent a great deal of my adult life trying to bring peace to Israel and its neighbors, based on justice and righteousness for the Palestinians. These are the underlying purposes of my new book."

In his book Palestine: Peace Not Apartheid, published in November 2006, Carter states:

Israel's continued control and colonization of Palestinian land have been the primary obstacles to a comprehensive peace agreement in the Holy Land.

He declares that Israel's current policies in the Palestinian territories constitute "a system of apartheid, with two peoples occupying the same land, but completely separated from each other, with Israelis totally dominant and suppressing violence by depriving Palestinians of their basic human rights." In an Op-Ed titled "Speaking Frankly about Israel and Palestine," published in the Los Angeles Times and other newspapers, Carter states:

The ultimate purpose of my book is to present facts about the Middle East that are largely unknown in America, to precipitate discussion and to help restart peace talks (now absent for six years) that can lead to permanent peace for Israel and its neighbors. Another hope is that Jews and other Americans who share this same goal might be motivated to express their views, even publicly, and perhaps in concert. I would be glad to help with that effort.

While some – such as a former Special Rapporteur for both the United Nations Commission on Human Rights and the International Law Commission, as well as a member of the Israeli Knesset – have praised Carter for speaking frankly about Palestinians in Israeli occupied lands, others – including the envoy to the Middle East under Clinton, as well as the first director of the Carter Center – have accused him of anti-Israeli bias. Specifically, these critics have alleged significant factual errors, omissions and misstatements in the book.

The 2007 documentary film, Man from Plains, follows President Carter during his tour for the controversial book and other humanitarian efforts.

In December 2009, Carter apologized for any words or deeds that may have upset the Jewish community in an open letter meant to improve an often tense relationship. He said he was offering an Al Het, a prayer said on Yom Kippur, the Jewish Day of Atonement.

=== We Can Have Peace in the Holy Land ===
We Can Have Peace in the Holy Land, a sequel to Palestine: Peace Not Apartheid, was released in 2009.

In an NPR interview regarding the book, Carter named the election of Barack Obama, progress in his meetings with members of the Palestinian parties in 2008, and the recent violence between Israel and Hamas in the Gaza Strip as the three developments that could help achieve peace between Israel and Palestine. Carter stated that he also saw the appointment of George J. Mitchell for United States Special Envoy for Middle East Peace as a positive development as well as Obama's declarations as a presidential candidate that he would seek peace between Israel and its neighbors which was a departure from Clinton and Bush.

Gershom Gorenberg wrote that Carter's counsel is recommendable in light of the Gaza crisis being "a reminder, as if another were needed, that ignoring this conflict is equivalent to waiting for it to explode again, with shock waves felt across the entire region". Gorenberg criticized the book as reading "as if it had first been spoken into a recorder for a couple of weeks, with the author working mainly from memory and his diary."

=== A Call to Action: Women, Religion, Violence, and Power ===
In February 2013, Simon & Schuster announced Carter's next book would be published the following month and would "draw upon personal observations from his worldwide travels as he condemns abuses of women and girls and the alleged distortions of religious texts cited as justification." A Call to Action: Women, Religion, Violence, and Power was later released in 2014.

The Pittsburgh Post-Gazette wrote of the book, "It should not only be required reading in America, but should also serve as the template for a complete reinterpretation of the religious views behind our treatment of each other."

In a March 2014 interview with NPR, Carter spoke of the conflicting verses in the Bible that spoke of both equality and inferiority of women and said he had received an encouraging letter from Pope Francis "saying that he believes that the status of women and the activity of women within the church needs to be increased, but there are some specific and very difficult things to overcome if the Catholic Church made that an ordained and official commitment."

=== A Full Life ===
In 2015 (and on his ninetieth birthday), Carter released A Full Life, a memoir on his early life, career, presidency, and retirement.

When asked what he hoped readers would learn from the book, Carter replied, "Well, I try to point out in the book the different phases in my life and the lessons that I have learned. When I have a disappointment or a failure or a setback, I try to learn from that and, if possible, when I have a failure, I try to set another goal in life that’s more ambitious than perhaps the one I failed at."

Glenn C. Altschuler of the Star Tribune wrote that the book should best be viewed as supplementary to Carter's 1982 presidential memoir Keeping Faith for its focus on his personal life and that the former president lets his guard down when recounting "less overtly political issues".

=== Faith: A Journey for All ===
In 2018, Carter released Faith: A Journey for All.

In an interview with The Salt Lake Tribune, Carter was asked why he chose to write a book with the word "Faith" as the title and he replied, "My publishers felt that, with the world situation today, a lot of people have lost faith in basic principles that shouldn’t be ever questioned: faith in democracy, faith in freedom, faith in equality, faith in the integrity of the truth, faith in the idea of education, faith in ourselves, quite often, faith in our fellow human beings."

== Reception ==
Carter's post-presidency activities have been favorably received. The Independent wrote, "Carter is widely considered a better man than he was a president." In 1989, Richard Cohen hailed Carter as the best former president for selfless and dignified work. Carter attributed his public role in the Panamanian election and dealings with General Manuel Antonio Noriega to then-President George H. W. Bush being "far more considerate of him and far more interested in his advice than Ronald Reagan ever was." In a November 2015 Quinnipiac University poll, 40 percent of American voters agreed that Carter had been the best post-presidency with Reagan in second place with 24 percent and Clinton at 19 percent. With African-American voters, Clinton was in first place with 47 percent, and Carter in second place at 35 percent. Our Revolution Executive Director Joseph Geevarghese credits Carter with promoting "progressive issues well before they became mainstream" and his post-presidency for laying "the groundwork for modern day activists to take up causes from environmental justice to workers rights to universal health care." In 2015, Carter said his life since leaving the White House "has been personally more gratifying, although the presidency was obviously the pinnacle of political success" and that he would pick the Carter Center over a second term as president if given the option.

Early into his retirement, he was seen as less active than fellow former President Ford. Carter also faced criticism for meeting with various foreign entities, with Mortimer B. Zuckerman accusing the former president of "legitimizing terrorism."
