= Displace Me =

Nationwide event

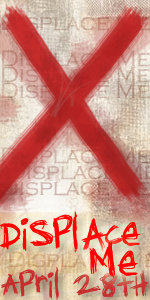
Promotional poster

Displace Me was a nationwide event hosted by the nonprofit Invisible Children Inc. on April 28, 2007. In 15 cities across the United States, 68,000 individuals came together to raise awareness about the situation of the displacement camps in northern Uganda.

The event had three main goals:

1. To educate participants about displacement camps in the North by simulating, as best as possible, the experience of living in an IDP camp.
2. To create greater national and international attention of the humanitarian crises in northern Uganda.
3. To garner the political attention needed to see a peaceful resolution to the Lord's Resistance Army insurgency, primarily through the appointment of one senior level U.S. diplomat.

== The event ==
Displace Me was created to be an experiential event. To encourage the simulation, participants were asked to bring the following:

- Enough cardboard to build something the size of a small tent.
- A sleeping bag.
- A 1.5-liter bottle of water (with an airtight seal—to be collected upon entry).
- A box of saltine crackers (with sealed packaging—to be collected upon entry).
- A current photo of you wearing a white T-shirt with a red X.

With 15 locations across the United States, participants had to travel long distances to reach their “camps.” The traveling aspect was reflective of the displaced individuals in northern Uganda who were given 48 hours to leave their homes and relocate to displaced camps throughout the region. Once Displace Me participants arrived at their camps, they built “huts” out of cardboard boxes. Throughout the remainder of the night, participants were rationed food and water and heard, via video, personal testimonies from those living in the IDP camps in the North.

Other aspects of the event included a speech at every city from an individual personally connected with the conflict. Speakers included the Gulu District Chairman Norbert Mao, Invisible Children’s Ugandan Country Director Jolly Okot, and the Senior Adviser to the International Crisis Group John Prendergast, among others. First Lady Laura Bush also directly addressed the Displace Me participants via a prerecorded speech shown on video. Participants concluded the night by writing letters to their government leaders and the President of Uganda, calling friends and family who were not aware of the conflict, as well as holding 21 minutes of silence for the 21 years of war.

During the night participants also helped film a video that was to be shown to members of the United States Senate. Participants in each city held up giant banners with their city's name and one to two phrases from the below statement.

== See also ==
- Global Night Commute
- Schools for Schools
- Invisible Children: Rough Cut
- Kony 2012
