= Kony 2012 =

2012 short documentary film

- Promotional poster for the video, featuring stylized forms of the donkey symbolizing the Democratic Party and the elephant symbolizing the Republican Party, overlapping to form a white dove of peace
- Directed by: Jason Russell
- Written by: Jason Russell; Jedidiah Jenkins; Kathryn Lang; Danica Russell; Ben Keesey; Azy Groth
- Produced by: Kimmy Vandivort; Heather Longerbeam; Chad Clendinen; Noelle Jouglet
- Cinematography: Jason Russell; Bobby Bailey; Laren Poole; Gavin Kelly; Chad Clendinen; Kevin Trout; Jay Salbert; Michael Spear; Shannon Lynch
- Edited by: Kathryn Lang; Kevin Trout; Jay Salbert; Jesse Eslinger; Michael Spear
- Distributed by: Invisible Children, Inc.
- Release date: March 5, 2012 (Internet)
- Running time: 30 minutes
- Country: United States
- Language: English

Kony 2012 is a 2012 American short documentary film produced by Invisible Children, Inc. The film's purpose was to make Ugandan cult leader, war criminal, and ICC fugitive Joseph Kony globally known so as to have him arrested by the end of 2012. The film was released on March 5, 2012, and spread virally, and the campaign was initially supported by various celebrities.

As of July 2025, the film had received over 103 million views and 1.3 million likes on the video-sharing website YouTube, and over 18.7 million views and over 21.8 thousand likes on Vimeo, with other views on a central Kony 2012 website operated by Invisible Children. At the time, the video was the most liked on the whole of YouTube, and is the first video ever to reach 1 million likes. The intense exposure of the video caused the Kony 2012 website to crash shortly after it began gaining widespread popularity. A poll suggested that more than half of young adult Americans heard about Kony 2012 in the days following the video's release. It was included among the top international events of 2012 by PBS and called the most viral video ever by Time magazine in 2013.

The campaign resulted in a resolution by the United States Senate and contributed to the African Union's decision to send troops to catch Kony. The film also called for an April 20 worldwide canvassing campaign, called "Cover the Night". On April 5, 2012, Invisible Children released a follow-up video, titled Kony 2012: Part II – Beyond Famous, which failed to repeat the success of the original.

== Synopsis ==
The film documents the Invisible Children's plans and efforts to capture Joseph Kony. It describes Kony's actions with his rebel militia group Lord's Resistance Army (LRA), including forced recruitment of child soldiers, and the regions (northern Uganda, the Democratic Republic of the Congo, and South Sudan) in which they have been active.

It is introduced with the song "02 Ghosts I" by Nine Inch Nails, and the text "Nothing is more powerful than an idea whose time has come. Nothing is more powerful than an idea whose time is now." Then, a view of the sun shining at the earth is shown, and director Jason Russell speaks the phrase '"Right now, there are more people on Facebook than there were on the planet 200 years ago. Humanity's greatest desire is to belong and connect, and now, we see each other. We hear each other. We share what we love. And this connection is changing the way the world works." The first scene after the introduction shows the birth of Jason Russell's son Gavin. The film contains rich sound design and 3D animations of pictures mapped over an earth globe, as well as of a crowd of people from bird's-eye view.

One of the main people featured in the film is a young Ugandan named Jacob Avaye, whose brother was killed by the LRA. In response, the director and founder of Invisible Children, Jason Russell, promises Jacob that he will help "stop Kony".

The film advocates the restoration of social order and curtailing compelled and coerced youth military service. The video also has clips of Jason Russell's young son reacting to the information about Kony. Near the end of the film, a 2011 announcement from U.S. President Barack Obama is shown authorizing the deployment of 100 Special Forces military advisers to provide "information, advice, and assistance to partner nation forces" of Central African countries to "remove Joseph Kony from the battlefield". The video concludes by urging viewers to join its publicity campaign by putting up posters and helping out in their communities.

In a later scene in the film, an action scene shows people sticking Kony 2012 posters in various places in a town, with the music "I Can't Stop" by Flux Pavilion playing in the background.

In the last minute of the film, the countdown that was first shown near the beginning, when the narrator said "the next 27 minutes are an experiment", finishes and textual calls to action are presented.

== Invisible Children ==
The Invisible Children charity has focused on obtaining the support of a select group of individuals in order to "help bring awareness to the abuse and killing of children in the East and Central African countries at the hands of Kony and his leadership." This list included 20 "celebrity culture makers", such as George Clooney, Angelina Jolie, Oprah Winfrey (who significantly helped to spread the video), Taylor Swift, and Ryan Seacrest. The list also featured 12 "policy makers" that have "the power to keep U.S. government officials in Africa" in order to work toward the capture of Kony. This list includes former US President George W. Bush and his Secretary of State Condoleezza Rice, and former US Secretary of State John Kerry.

A number of celebrities endorsed the awareness campaign against Kony, including Justin Bieber, Bill Gates, Christina Milian, Nicki Minaj, Kim Kardashian, Pete Wentz, Rihanna, and Elliot Page. (Note: Page had not yet transitioned, and was known as "Ellen Page" at that time.)

=== Cover the Night ===
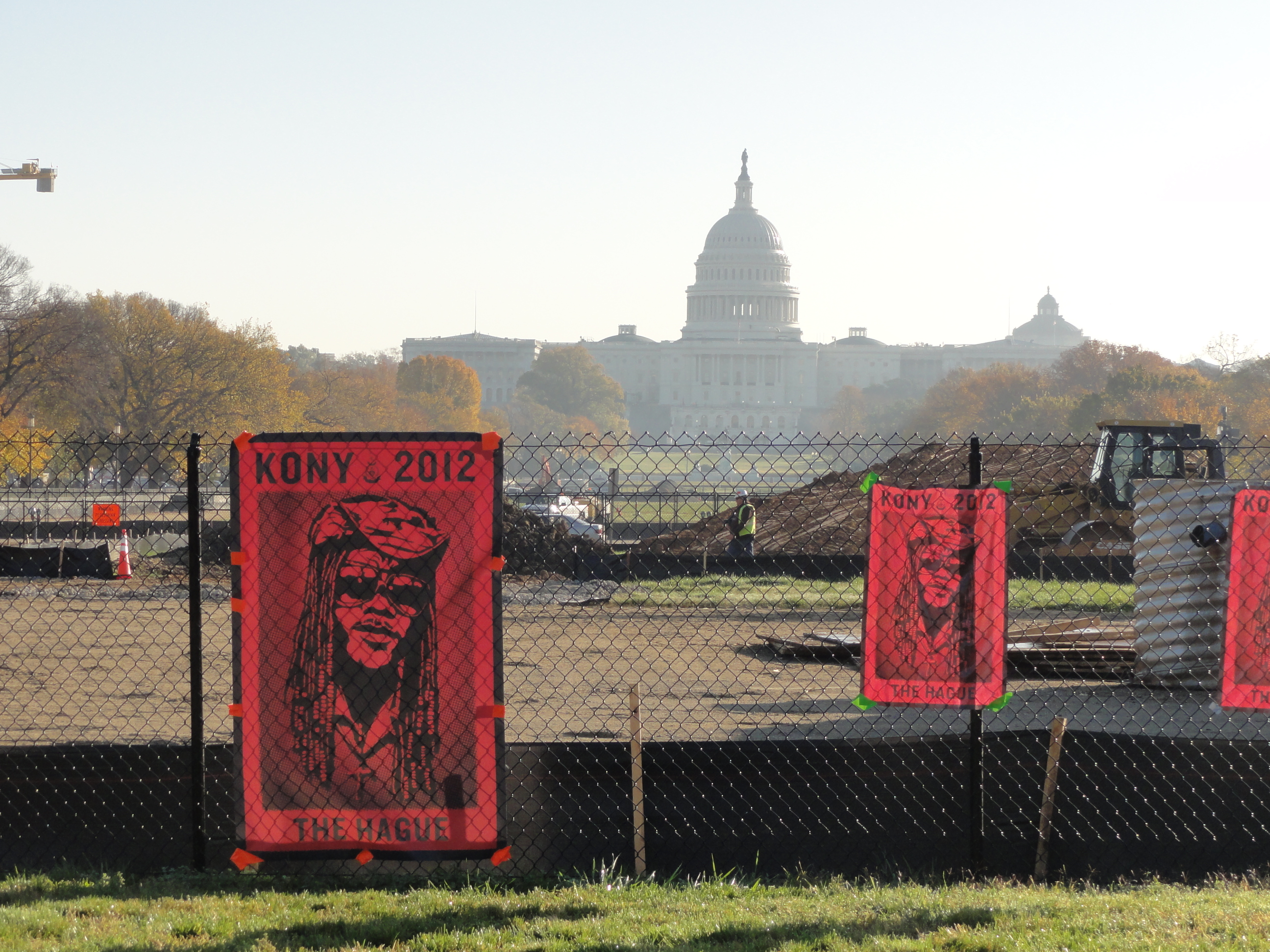
Kony 2012 posters on a fence on the National Mall in Washington, D.C.

As part of the campaign, US supporters were asked to put up posters in their hometowns in an action named "Cover the Night", which took place on April 20, 2012. Invisible Children offered posters and T-shirts in an attempt to gain wider recognition. They also created action kits to help spread awareness that included campaign buttons, posters, bracelets, and stickers. The announcement video to "Cover the night" was aired on April 4, 2012.

The "Cover the Night" event took place worldwide on April 20, 2012, and was to be conducted by supporters who were encouraged to perform some sort of charity work that morning in their local community. Then, that evening, they were to post flyers and posters throughout their city for the Kony 2012 campaign. The turnout for the event worldwide was much smaller than initially expected, with no organized spots officially announced and many fewer people attending than had pledged to attend. A tweet from Invisible Children stated, "There is no official meet-up as we are asking people to act locally with friends+family [sic] in their neighborhoods." Despite over 50,000 people signing up and buying kits, very few people actually participated. One gathering in Vancouver had only 17 people; another in Brisbane had fewer than 50 attendees. In Kelowna, British Columbia, several signs and posters were put up, including two large banners that were "placed on both sides of the pedestrian overpass". In Canberra, several Facebook groups resulted in a few gatherings of two or three people each. In Phoenix, 200 posters were put up by "college students and other people in their teens and 20s", along with a number of chalk and stencil messages.

== Reception ==
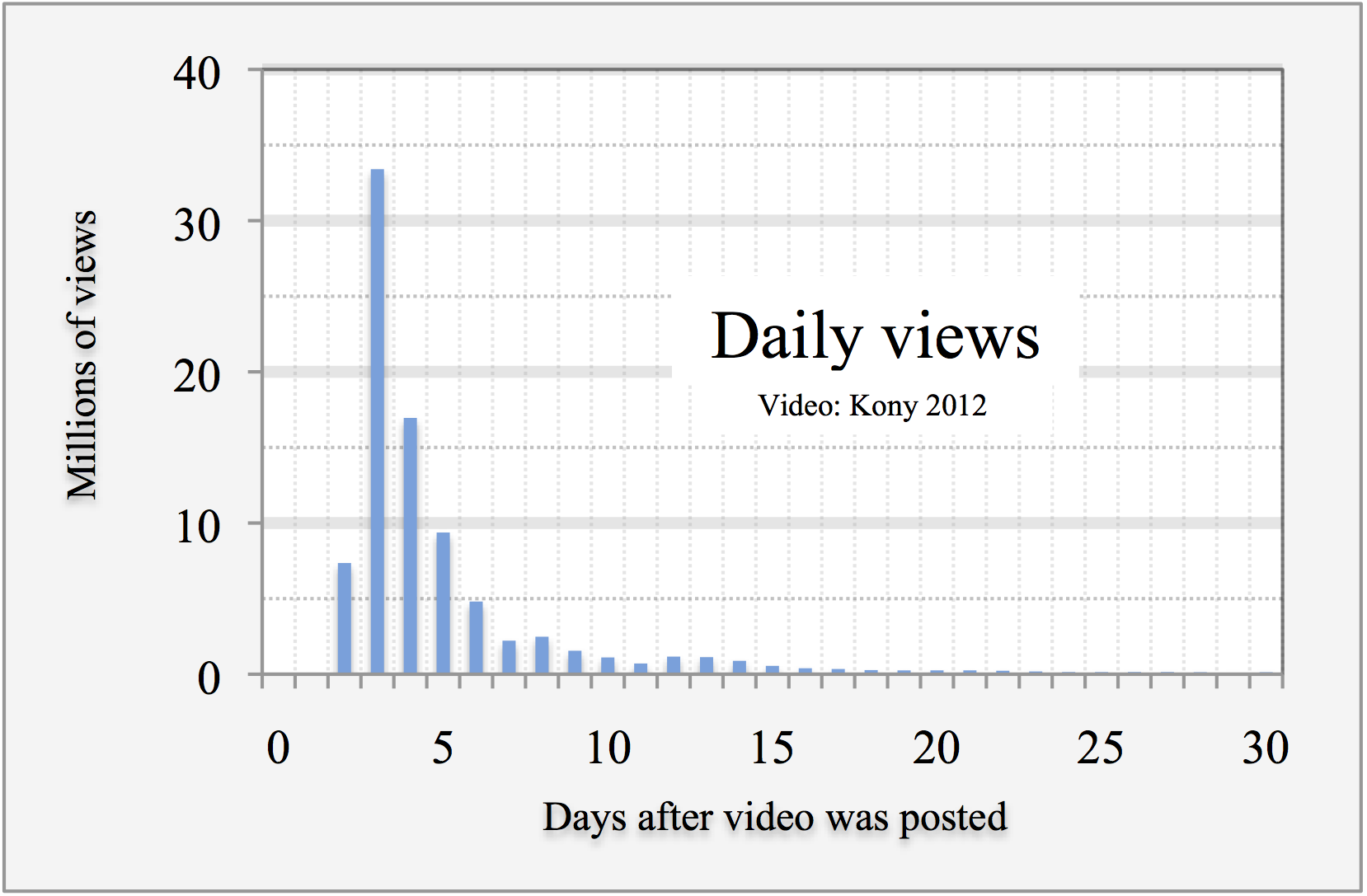
Daily video views on YouTube (not including Vimeo, etc.), illustrating a maximum daily viewership on the video's third day

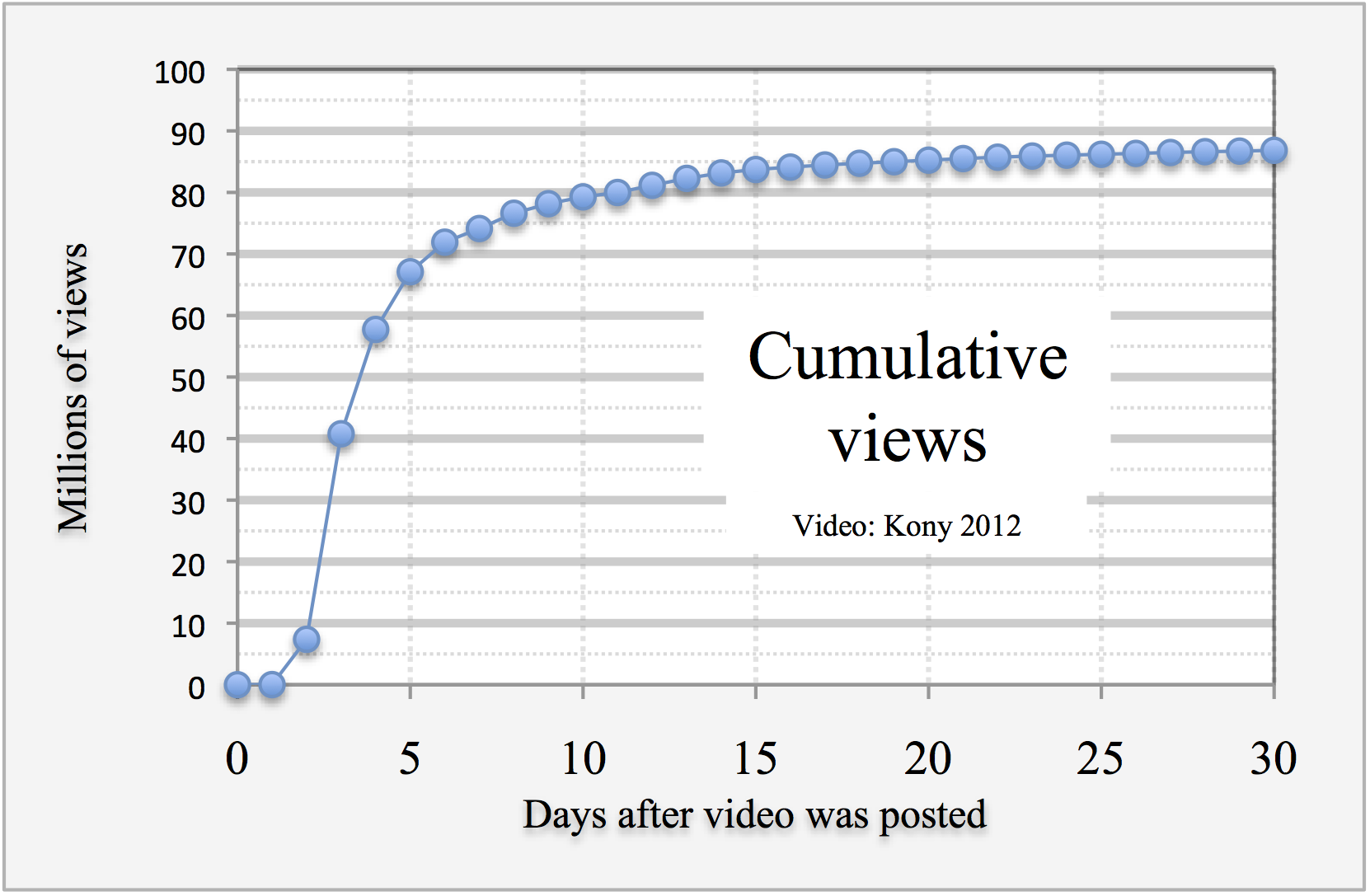
Cumulative views on YouTube, showing a lower, though steady, view growth rate after its first ten days

The film sparked a heated controversy regarding its merits, with very differing opinions being expressed by various NGO workers, government and international officials, journalists, and other groups and individuals.

=== Positive ===
Luis Moreno Ocampo, who was featured in the film and was, at the time, the chief Prosecutor at the International Criminal Court (ICC), voiced his support of the film and the campaign that had "mobilised the world", and said that the criticism was "stupid". The Special Representative and head of the newly created United Nations Regional Office for Central Africa (UNOCA), Abou Moussa, said that international interest in Kony was "useful, very important". The White House released a statement of support through Press Secretary Jay Carney, who stated in a news conference, "We congratulate the hundreds of thousands of Americans who have mobilized to this unique crisis of conscience" and said that the raised awareness from the video is "consistent with the bipartisan legislation passed by our congress in 2010." Cameron Hudson, policy director at the United States Holocaust Memorial Museum and former Africa director in the National Security Council, also praised Invisible Children for reaching "tens of millions of people who probably never previously heard of Joseph Kony." Anthony Lake, the executive director of UNICEF, was cited as saying that a similar viral video would have made a difference during the Rwandan genocide in 1994, also suggesting that "this kind of public attention would also have helped save more lives in Darfur and in Congo's warring east."

Human Rights Watch (HRW)'s Africa division senior researcher Anneke Van Woudenberg wrote in a statement: "We've spent years investigating the horrors perpetrated by the LRA in central Africa—Uganda, Democratic Republic of Congo, Central African Republic (CAR), and South Sudan. We gathered evidence at massacre sites—wooden clubs covered in dried blood, rubber strips from bicycle tires used to tie up the victims, and freshly dug graves—and spoke to hundreds of boys and girls forced to fight for his army or held captive as sex slaves. And we're elated that #stopKony is a trending topic on Twitter—if anyone deserves global notoriety it's Kony." She added: "Arresting Kony and other senior LRA leaders would reaffirm that those who commit mass atrocities will face justice. It will also help end the scourge of one of the most brutal rebel groups in Africa." HRW's LRA researcher Ida Sawyer reaffirmed, "we definitely support the message of the film and we think it's great that they're bringing so much attention to the film with Kony's crimes and the phenomena of the LRA." Amnesty International, which had documented what it described as the LRA's "horrific impact on the lives of thousands of civilians in Central African Republic, Democratic Republic of Congo, South Sudan and Uganda" and for years had been calling for the LRA leaders to be arrested, welcomed the massive public response to the Kony 2012 campaign. Erwin van der Borght, the organization's Africa director, wrote in a statement: "Joseph Kony and other LRA leaders have evaded arrest for far too long and this campaign is a salient reminder of the continuing crimes by LRA members and the need to arrest and surrender their leaders to the ICC so they can face trial," but added: "Anyone joining the Kony 2012 campaign should insist that efforts to arrest Joseph Kony must respect human rights", especially because "many of LRA members were themselves victims of human rights violations including forcible recruitment", and ensure the protection of civilians.

Opinions on the film were mixed in Gulu, one of the former centers of rebel activities in northern Uganda, during a showing of the film, with several of the leaders expressing support and criticism. One of the attendees, State Minister for Foreign Affairs Henry Oryem Okello, said that the criticisms directed at the film and Invisible Children were "unfounded", going on to state, "Invisible Children has done visible things in Acholi[land], for example offering scholarships to thousands of children and anyone against them is our enemy." Betty Bigombe, a Ugandan cabinet minister and former peace negotiator, said, "I do not know whether it makes any difference as far as taking [Kony] out is concerned. However, what is important is bringing this to the attention of policymakers. I hope that something innovative will come out of it." Norbert Mao, Ugandan politician and president of the opposition Democratic Party, stated his support for the film, explaining that while it does have some problems, such as implying Ugandans did not try to fight back against the LRA and not explaining how many of the issues in the film were also exacerbated by the Ugandan government itself, the film is still a "positive development" for the issue, adding that while Invisible Children may not be "the foremost analysts of the complicated political, historical and security dynamics" in the situation, "they have the most beautiful trait on earth – compassion."

Journalist Nicholas D. Kristof thanked Invisible Children for making the film and addressed its criticism, stating that rather than being "white man's burden", when "a warlord continues to kill and torture across a swath of Congo and Central African Republic ... it's a human burden." He also said that complexity had long been "a leading excuse for inaction during atrocities" and that Kony remains a threat in Uganda's neighbour countries, so the simplicity of the film "has left the American public more informed" than it would be otherwise, and that if he "were a Congolese villager", he would "welcome these uncertain efforts over the sneering scorn of do-nothing armchair cynics." Foreign correspondent Roger Cohen called it "simplifying grossly and distorting adeptly to make a valid point: that no effort should be spared to arrest Kony." British film critic Peter Bradshaw wrote that Kony 2012, despite its flaws, "lands an almighty punch. This is a principled campaign ad, and a very, very effective one." Former war correspondent Gotham Chopra said that he understands "the instinctive backlash (really it's irritation)" towards the film and the campaign, but "there is enormous value in the fact that millions of people are talking today about genocide in Africa that were mostly unaware of it yesterday." Jane Bussmann, author of a 2009 book about Kony and the President of Uganda Yoweri Museveni, compared the campaign favorably to the "culture of charity-as-industry" as "at least Kony2012 linked suffering to perpetrators, and urged the young American audience it's aimed at to contact a politician." Matthew Green, author of a 2008 book about Kony and the LRA conflict, The Wizard of the Nile, wrote that IC had "achieved more with their 30-minute video than battalions of diplomats, NGO workers and journalists have since the conflict began 26 years ago."

Jacob Acaye, the former child soldier featured in the film, supported the video and defended its makers. In response to Ugandans saying that the film was out-of-date, Jacob stated that, "It is not too late, because all this fighting and suffering is still going on elsewhere. Until now, the war that was going on has been a silent war. People did not really know about it. Now what was happening in Gulu is still going on elsewhere in the Central African Republic and in Congo. What about the people who are suffering over there? They are going through what we were going through." It was noted by Los Angeles Times journalists Lindsay Branham and Jocelyn Kelly that a number of people living in the areas where the LRA is currently active have previously called for attention and advocacy to be directed at the issue. Julien Marneffe, a worker for Catholic Relief Services in Goma said "it's been an undeniable success – and one all humanitarian organizations working in this area can be happy about," but added to "be careful not to oversimplify the issue" and worried that the interest might be short-lived when "another crisis or another video will be the next online trend, and I fear that most people will forget about the problems of the LRA."

The film has been featured in YouTube Rewind 2012, resembling its first few seconds both visually and with the string instrument sound, and the derived text "Nothing is more powerful than a video whose time has come. Nothing is more powerful than a video whose time is 2012."

=== Negative ===
Since the video's release, Invisible Children has come under criticism for oversimplification of events in the region and has been accused of engaging in "slacktivism", in which a person donates or takes actions that have little to no effect beyond making said person feel as if they contributed to a positive cause. While the campaign promotes global activism, it has been criticized for providing a black-and-white picture rather than encouraging the viewers to learn about the situation. Mikaela Luttrell-Rowland from Clark University's Strassler Center for Holocaust and Genocide Studies stated that it was "irresponsible to prize feel good, simplistic messages over complex history and to treat consumerist-consciousness raising as interchangeable with education." Africa researcher Alex de Waal accused the film of "peddling dangerous and patronizing falsehoods," criticized the campaign as "naïve" for "elevating Kony to a global celebrity, the embodiment of evil," that might only help him as a terrorist and cult leader and said that instead they should've been "demystifying Kony—reducing him to a common criminal and a failed provincial politician."

One point of criticism is that the film gives a misleading impression of the whereabouts and magnitude of Kony's remaining LRA forces. As of early 2012, Kony's followers were thought to number only in the hundreds, and Kony himself was believed to be in the Central African Republic rather than Uganda, a fact that receives only a passing mention in the video. This problem raised questions about the plausibility of Ugandan army intervention, which the video advocates for. Since Kony and most of the LRA forces are currently not in Uganda, the Ugandan army would need to coordinate with the governments and militaries of the other countries where the LRA is active.

Dinaw Mengestu, an Ethiopian American writer and Africa researcher, wrote that the real-world Kony is "not a click away" and a simple solution of raising popular awareness is "a beautiful equation that can only work so long as we believe that nothing in the world happens unless we know about it ... only works in the myopic reality of the film, a reality that deliberately eschews depth and complexity." Amanda Weisbaum of the charity War Child said that "just getting rid of one person does not solve the problem" and that the focus of the film should rather have been on helping ex-child soldiers. Anne Goddard, president and CEO of ChildFund International, wrote that "by narrowing the focus on Kony, by defining success so singularly, it gives people a greater sense that the issue [of globally widespread conscription of young children] can be resolved. And that hope feeds on itself in a way that becomes infectious." United Nations Under-Secretary-General Radhika Coomaraswamy called for the Kony2012 campaign to divert its donation funds from supporting military action to capture Kony to rehabilitation and reintegration programmes for former child soldiers. Victor Ochen, founder and director of Ugandan rehabilitation NGO African Youth Initiative Network (AYINET), said that campaign "to promote [Kony] or make him famous" is "offensive", in part because of the Cover the Night event's date (an anniversary of the Atiak massacre by the LRA in Uganda in 1995 and the date of birth of Adolf Hitler), adding "How do you think Americans would have reacted if people in another country wore Osama bin Laden T-shirts?"

After the film's release, there was criticism in Uganda of its failure to state more clearly that Kony and his forces fled northern Uganda in 2006 and were dispersed across the jungles of three neighboring countries. Fred Opolot, a spokesman for the Ugandan government, said, "It is totally misleading to suggest that the war is still in Uganda." Arthur Larok, ActionAid's director in Uganda, said, "It doesn't sound like a fair representation of Uganda. We have challenges within the country, but certainly the perception of a country at war is not accurate at all." Dr Beatrice Mpora, director of a community health organization in Gulu, commented, "There has not been a single soul from the LRA here since 2006. Now we have peace, people are back in their homes, they are planting their fields, they are starting their businesses. That is what people should help us with." Prime Minister of Uganda Amama Mbabazi launched an online response on YouTube, in which he seeks to correct the "false impression" that Uganda is still at war, and invites everyone to visit the country, assuring that people would find it "a very different place to that portrayed by Invisible Children". Meanwhile, dozens of members of Ugandan diaspora in United States protested outside the Invisible Children offices in San Diego, also criticizing the video but saying Kony represents "only three percent of all the problems" in their home country and lambasting the Ugandan government for its inadequate response to Kony's terror and other issues.

A March 2012 mass showing of the film in Lira, the site of one of Kony's worst atrocities in Uganda, was met with jeering and thrown objects at the screen and at the group African Youth Initiative Network, which screened the film and provided translations. The screening prompted angry calls to local radio stations by Ugandans upset that the film was so focused on the filmmakers and Kony while neglecting the conflict's victims, prompting complaints that the film was "more about whites than Ugandans." Others objected to being reminded of the horrors Kony brought to Uganda. Despite the negative response, the organization still planned on showing the film in other towns, hoping to avoid this response by providing context for the film. Some Ugandan commentators have also criticized the video for its aim of making Kony "famous", even believing it means to "celebrate" him, and for its advocacy of foreign military intervention to stop him.

Mahmood Mamdani, of the Institute of Social Research at Makerere University, Kampala, argued that the LRA is "a Ugandan problem calling for a Ugandan political solution" and against "mobilisation of millions [to] be subverted into yet another weapon in the hands of those who want to further militarise the region." Ugandan journalist Rosebell Kagumire said that "the war is much more complex than one man called Joseph Kony." A more recent showing of Kony 2012 at Pece War Memorial Stadium in Gulu, Uganda sparked a riot in which dozens of people were injured. The archbishop of Gulu, Rt Rev. John Baptist Odama, was reported as saying that the video "has ill motives and geared towards igniting anger in the population to cause violence." Margaret Aciro, whose picture appears in the video showing her face mutilated by the LRA, said she "became sad" after seeing it being "used to profit."

Father Ernest Sugule, national coordinator of the Congolese non-governmental organization SAIPD in Dungu, DRC, claimed that the few people there "who have succeeded in watching [Kony 2012] are very critical on the film," as is he himself. Charlie Beckett, a media communications expert at the London School of Economics (LSE), said what Invisible Children hasn't "got the capacity for is to take that beyond another action. What are they going to do with all this energy and interest? It's going to dissipate. ... I think this will crash and die, I don't think they will catch Kony. People will say they bought the bracelet and stuck posters on lamppost but that could have negative effects when it doesn't actually lead anywhere."

=== Lord's Resistance Army's response ===
A statement purported to be released by Kony's Lord's Resistance Army rebels and signed by the group's spokesman and negotiator Justine Nyeko ("The Leader, LRA Peace Team") condemned the film as "a cheap and banal panic act of mass trickery to make the unsuspecting peoples of the world complicit in the US rogue and murderous activities in Central Africa." The statement was obtained by Ugandan journalist Frank Nyakairu, received from Nairobi, Kenya-based LRA representatives. It was also reported that the LRA abduction rate sharply increased in the weeks since the film was released, although it was impossible to confirm the link between the rise in LRA attacks and Kony's global notoriety.

=== Invisible Children's response ===
On March 8, 2012, Invisible Children released an official response addressing the criticisms directed at Kony 2012. As an explanation for the simplicity of the movie, they stated that "in [their] quest to garner wide public support of nuanced policy, [they] sought to explain the conflict in an easily understandable format." Jedidiah Jenkins, the director of idea development for Invisible Children, responded to the new criticisms by saying that they were "myopic" and that the video itself was a "tipping point" that "got young people to care about an issue on the other side of the planet that doesn't affect them." In response to concerns about working with the Ugandan government, Invisible Children explained that they "do not defend any of the human rights abuses perpetrated by the Ugandan government or the Ugandan army". They added that the reason why they are working with the Ugandan army even though Kony is no longer in Uganda is that the army is "more organized and better equipped than that of any of the other affected countries (DRC, South Sudan, CAR) to track down Joseph Kony" and that they want all of the governments in the region to work together to arrest Kony. Jenkins stated, "There is a huge problem with political corruption in Africa. If we had the purity to say we will not partner with anyone corrupt, we couldn't partner with anyone."

A video titled Thank you, KONY 2012 Supporters was released on March 12, 2012, to address the criticisms directed at the film and to be "fully transparent", according to Invisible Children CEO Ben Keesey. The film begins with Keesey discussing the three things that the charity focuses on, which are to "create films with compelling narratives, promote international advocacy and run on-the-ground initiatives." He also points out that "overhead and travel costs are essential to those efforts", as a part of the group's management expenses, along with going toward "thousands of free screenings of the group's films worldwide, as well as toward bringing survivors of the Lord's Resistance Army ... to speak at these events." Keesey explains the way the charity's annual expenditures are made, with "80.5 percent to 85.7 percent of total annual spending from fiscal 2007 to 2011" going toward "'program expenses'—money that directly benefits their cause", and finished by urging interested parties to make inquires to the group via Twitter, using the account @invisible and hashtag #AskICAnything. Two further short videos featured LRA survivors expressing support for the film and the organization.

The website Kickstriker, a parody of Kickstarter, contains a fake appeal to crowdsource the "hiring private military contractors from Academi (formerly Blackwater), who will be immediately deployed to central Africa" with a mission to capture or kill Kony. In response, Invisible Children sent the Kickstriker team a cease and desist warning to take down the parody page, accusing them of "causing public confusion through your use of Invisible Children's copyrighted and trademarked property" and threatening a legal action. According to Wired.com, the legal threats "[had] Kickstriker's founders rolling their eyes."

== Follow-up films ==
=== Kony 2012 Part II ===
Kony 2012: Part II – Beyond Famous is a 20-minute video follow-up to Kony 2012 released in April 2012.

Beyond Famous aimed to address criticisms of the original film and to present more information about Kony's LRA rebellion, including its impact on countries other than Uganda, as well as about Invisible Children's work and the Kony 2012 campaign. Executive Director and CEO of Invisible Children, Inc. Ben Keesey, who narrates the film, said the sequel was made in two weeks. In a statement announcing the video, Keesey said that Invisible Children wants people "to dig deeper into this conflict and actively engage in the solutions." Jason Russell, who was hospitalized on March 15 due to "a temporary psychotic breakdown believed to have been brought on by the pressure of the success—and criticism—of the first film", is not featured in Part II.

==== Reception ====
In a pre-release comment, popular culture expert Robert Thompson said: "The fact is, the story has developed in so many odd ways with all the controversy, and the sequel can't really promise the bang of that first video—which is informing people of something they did not know before. Now we're getting into the details, which is never that thrilling." The LRA researcher Craig Valters of the LSE's Department of International Development said that the second video "overwhelmingly" failed to answer criticisms raised by the first film. On the other hand, Mike Pflanz, East Africa correspondent for The Daily Telegraph, said that the sequel was "a more solid, moving and, finally, accurate presentation of the ongoing battle to capture Joseph Kony" and that, in comparison to the original video, the "new video is couched in nuance and deploys dialogue more commonly heard in a United Nations workshop – displacement, rehabilitation, post-conflict – than in a YouTube smash."

According to The Guardian, the sequel "does not seem to have captured the public's imagination in quite the same way as Invisible Children's earlier video did, failing to significantly trend on social media websites." By April 16, 2012, it had received 1.7 million views in 11 days, less than 2% of what the first video had in its first five days. Matt Fiorentino, director of marketing at video measurement firm Visible Measures, considered the first campaign a never-seen-before anomaly, and despite being dwarfed by its predecessor, the number of views Beyond Famous received was "pretty good" when compared to a regular social campaign. The Guardian nevertheless described Beyond Famous as "one of the top 25 non-profit campaigns ever."

As of April 2022, more than 10 years after release, the film has amassed 2.9 million views on YouTube.

=== MOVE ===
On 25 October 2012, the 31-minute film MOVE was released by Invisible Children, documenting the happenings behind the scenes of the campaign, such as how the website Kony2012.com was heavily overloaded.

As of 16 December 2022, the film has been viewed around 147,000 times on YouTube.

=== What happened to KONY 2012? ===
On 6 March 2013, one year and one day after the original film's release, a follow-up film called What happened to KONY 2012? was uploaded to the Invisible Children, Inc. YouTube channel, retrospectively summarizing the happenings of the campaign.

As of 27 January 2025, What happened to KONY 2012? has been viewed 319,000 times.

== Impact ==
=== Africa ===
On March 23, 2012, the African Union (AU) announced its intentions to send an international brigade of 5,000 military troops "from Uganda, South Sudan, Central African Republic and Congo, countries where Kony's reign of terror has been felt over the years ... to join the hunt for rebel leader Joseph Kony" and to "neutralize" him. According to the statement, the mission commenced on March 24, 2012, and the search "will last until Kony is caught", after which the task force will be disbanded. The effort is Ugandan-led and backed by the U.S. with the 100 advisers already there, who are offering advice, intelligence and training, along with equipment. The brigade has established its headquarters in Yambio in South Sudan, close to the border with the DRC, and is commanded by a Ugandan officer; a Congolese officer has oversight of intelligence operations.

The United Nations High Commissioner for Refugees (UNHCR) spokeswoman Melissa Fleming said the agency welcomed the "unprecedented" initiative to "end the atrocities in the region" and urged all involved to respect human rights and minimize risk to civilians. AU counter-terrorism envoy Francisco Madeira said, "We need to stop Kony." The ICC chief prosecutor Luis Moreno Ocampo voiced confidence that the video will "produce the arrest of Joseph Kony this year," adding: "That is the impact of the campaign." However, Patrick Wegner, an academic at the Max Planck Research School on Successful Dispute Resolution in International Law, claimed it was "plain wrong" to suggest the AU action was prompted solely by Kony 2012, saying that "the idea is a lot older than the Kony 2012 video" as the plans for forming an anti-LRA regional military force have been first reported in international news media in 2010.

=== United States ===
On March 21, 2012, a resolution "condemning Joseph Kony and his ruthless guerrilla group for a 26-year campaign of terror" was put forward by Senators Jim Inhofe and Chris Coons. The resolution stated that it would back "the effort of Uganda, the Democratic Republic of Congo, the Central African Republic and the newest country, South Sudan, to stop Kony and his Lord's Resistance Army", along with an official statement of support "for the U.S. effort to help regional forces pursue commanders of the militia group." Overall, the resolution received support from 34 senators, both Republicans and Democrats.

Support among senators for the resolution came about after the release of the Kony 2012 video and its subsequent popularity. One of the resolution leaders, Senator Chris Coons, became aware of the situation after his daughters asked him what he was doing to stop Kony and Senator Roy Blunt was informed "at a Missouri caucus in St. Louis when a constituent quizzed him about Kony". One of the co-sponsors of the resolution, Senator Lindsey Graham, stated that "When you get 100 million Americans looking at something, you will get our attention. This YouTube sensation is going to help the Congress be more aggressive and will do more to lead to his demise than all other action combined."

== Aftermath ==
On March 15, 2016, Jason Russell held a TEDx talk in Valencia, California, regarding the film's impact.

Dipo Faloyin discusses and critiques the film and its impact in the book Africa Is Not a Country: Breaking Stereotypes of Modern Africa.

As of 2026, Joseph Kony was still at large.

== See also ==
- Child soldiers in the Democratic Republic of the Congo
- International Criminal Court investigation in Uganda
- Lord's Resistance Army Disarmament and Northern Uganda Recovery Act
- White savior industrial complex
