= Schools for Schools =

Fundraising program

Schools for Schools is a fundraising program created by the nonprofit organization Invisible Children Inc. The program encourages students and schools in the Western world to compete creatively to raise money that is used to rebuild schools in northern Uganda. Education standards and facilities in the northern part of the country have suffered due to the Lord's Resistance Army insurgency.

== Background ==
The program attempts to encourage academic excellence and leadership in students and on a much larger scale within the schools. Not all children are able to attend school in Uganda, and the children who are able to attend face poor classroom conditions. Through the Schools for Schools program, Invisible Children Inc. is working to improve education in northern Uganda through career guidance and teacher training.

Prior to the war, at least five of Uganda's top 10 schools came from the north of the country. Today, those same schools do not even rank in the top 100.

After Uganda's Millennium Goal of Universal Primary Education was introduced, many organizations began to focus their efforts on primary schools. The lack of attention given to post-primary schools has made the pursuit of higher education difficult for students and teachers.

Schools for Schools is the largest-scale project to date, addressing the region’s need for improved learning environments and a larger investment in higher education. By rebuilding 11 of the most promising secondary schools in the region, Invisible Children attempted to allow high quality education for students to improve themselves and their country

== Function ==
Schools for Schools is one of the first fundraising programs to function using an alive interactive website. When a school in the West registers on the site, it is assigned to one of 10 "clusters," each of which is partnered with a specific school in northern Uganda. The goal of each school cluster is to raise as much money as possible for its partner Ugandan school.

The money raised goes toward rebuilding and refurbishing the partner schools in five main categories: water and sanitation, infrastructure and facilities, teacher training and incentives, equipment and resources, and technology.

As progress in fundraising is tracked on the website, students can compare how their school is performing relative to other schools. Students can also watch a real-time progress bar that allows them to see what their funds are helping to rebuild in northern Uganda.

At the end of the competition, the top fundraisers from each cluster are awarded trips to Uganda to help implement projects funded by money they have raised.

== Development ==
The development of Schools for Schools is an atypical approach to international aid. Invisible Children Inc. wanted to choose programs that would do more than just temporarily address the gaps, but instead encourage community involvement and offer long-term change in the region's education.

They selected which secondary schools they would partner with in northern Uganda. After developing selection criteria, Schools for Schools originally chose 10 institutions that had the best hope for creating lasting educational change. Three of the ten are schools displaced by the conflict and are now looking to return to their original sites after more than ten years.

As Invisible Children wanted local ideas and community participation to lead efforts toward effective change, they created a development committee for each of the 10 schools. These committees include students, teachers, parents, members of the administration, Board of Governors, and local government. These groups established the list of project priorities for each school within the five categories of progress. The committee allows Invisible Children to continually tailor their efforts to meet each school's specific needs.

More than 90% of the funds raised from the Schools for Schools competition go directly to northern Uganda for implementation fostering children's educational purposes. The other 10% is used for administrative and material costs for the program and for motivation of teachers.

== Pilot session ==
In the first semester, 582 international schools joined the competition and in only 100 days raised more than $1.6 million. Over 90% of those funds are currently being used on the ground in northern Uganda.

In July 2007, Schools for Schools began the first implementation of these projects. This first phase focused on refurbishment projects as well as the construction of new classrooms and science laboratories at Lacor Secondary School, Gulu High School, Layibi Secondary School, and Atanga Secondary School. Construction at these sites began in July 2007 and continued until February 2008. In February, the second phase of implementation began, focusing on the remaining projects in all ten schools. Major works for infrastructure implementation include the completion of a second story of a new girls' dormitory; the construction of classroom blocks and science laboratories; renovation and refurbishment of existing classrooms and administrative blocks; perimeter fencing; borehole construction; and renovation of plumbing systems. Schools for Schools also provides equipment and resources, including textbooks, sports and art materials, science apparatus, and other teaching and learning materials. Training and support are provided through workshops, regular stakeholders' sessions, and monitoring and evaluation.

All Round One projects in these schools were completed by June 2008.

The first project undertaken by the Schools for Schools implementation team was a two-story girls’ dormitory at Gulu High School, completed in February 2008. A grant from Africare was used to carry out water and sanitation improvements at seven of the 10 schools.

== Round two ==
Round Two of Schools for Schools launched in September 2007 and ended January 2008, with money still coming in months later. More than $1.7 million came in from this semester and was funneled back to the 10 partner schools.

The team on the ground worked closely with the School Development Committees to spend this money, carry out needs and infrastructure assessments, draw building plans, seek technical advice, and devise budgets. This second phase of projects began in July 2008.

== Round three ==
Round Three of Schools for Schools started on September 8, 2008 with an international tour and an additional partner school in northern Uganda, Keyo Secondary School. Along with it, Invisible Children released GO!, a documentary about a group of American students traveling to northern Uganda during the summer of 2007.

== See also ==
- Invisible Children - The Documentary
- Displace Me
- Global Night Commute
- Operation Day's Work
