= 2006–2008 Juba talks =

Series of negotiations between the government of Uganda and the LRA

The Juba talks were a series of negotiations between the government of Uganda and the Lord's Resistance Army rebel group over the terms of a ceasefire and possible peace agreement. The talks, held in Juba, the capital of autonomous Southern Sudan, began in July 2006 and were mediated by Riek Machar, the Vice President of Southern Sudan. The talks, which had resulted in a ceasefire by September 2006, were described as the best chance ever for a negotiated settlement to the 20-year-old war. However, LRA leader Joseph Kony refused to sign the peace agreement in April 2008. Two months later, the LRA carried out an attack on a Southern Sudanese town, prompting the Government of Southern Sudan to officially withdraw from their mediation role. Harvard University published a case study on the talks entitled: Giving Peace a Chance: The 2006-2008 Negotiations to End the Conflict in Northern Uganda.

== Preparations ==
A delegation from the LRA arrived in Juba, Sudan on 8 June 2006 to prepare for talks with the Ugandan government, to be mediated by the Government of Southern Sudan and by the Community of Sant'Egidio. These talks were agreed to after Kony released a video in May in which he denied committing atrocities and seemed to call for an end to hostilities, in response to an announcement by Museveni that he would guarantee the safety of Kony if peace was agreed to by July. Museveni had pledged to grant Kony total amnesty if he gave up "terrorism". Uganda's security minister Amama Mbabazi urged the International Criminal Court to drop the indictments issued in 2005 against leaders of the LRA, but LRA legal adviser Krispus Ayena Odongo rejected the offer, saying that accepting amnesty "presupposes surrender" and would mean the LRA was no longer available for discussions. Several organizations, including the ICC and the International Bar Association's Human Rights Institute insisted that LRA leaders must be arrested in accordance with the Rome Statute.

Joseph Kony gave his first interview to the press after 20 years of carrying out the conflict in late June 2006. He denied that the LRA had carried out any atrocities and blamed President Museveni for oppressing the Acholi. Regardless, in late June 2006, the Government of Southern Sudan formally invited Uganda to attend peace talks.

== Initial negotiations ==
On 14 July 2006 talks began in Juba between delegations from the LRA and Uganda, with the Vice-president of Southern Sudan Riek Machar as the chief mediator. The leader of the Ugandan delegation, Internal Affairs Minister Ruhakana Rugunda stated that his priority was to obtain a quick ceasefire. The LRA delegation, led by Martin Ojul, said that LRA's acceptance of the peace talks should not be interpreted that LRA can no longer fight, but stressed that a negotiated settlement is the best way to end the conflict.

The initial delegation was criticized as largely consisting of expatriate Acholi, rather than members of the fighting force. However, after many delays Vincent Otti arrived for meetings on the 29th, followed the next day by Kony's 14-year-old son Salim Saleh Kony (sharing a name with the brother of President Museveni, Salim Saleh). Kony himself met with local religious and political leaders from northern Uganda and southern Sudan on the following day. On 2 August, Kony held his first-ever press conference in which he demanded a ceasefire before LRA-government negotiations resumed on the 7th and denied ever abducting children. Some media sources noted that, of the approximately 80 LRA fighters surrounding the press venue, several appeared to be in their early teens.

The broader context of the talks remained confused. The government of Southern Sudan views the talks as a means of ridding itself of a foreign army that is complicating their delicate relationship with the Khartoum government. The request by the Ugandan Government for ICC to suspend war crimes indictments against leaders of the LRA, condemned by international human rights groups but largely supported by leaders and civilians within northern Uganda, led some political analysts to see Ugandan Government's request as a ploy to gain local support. The comment of a George Olara, an IDP living in a camp in Pader, was fairly typical: "He [Kony] should not be taken to The Hague. Let him come back and live with the community because this is how reconciliation will be achieved. ... Peace will come if the talks succeed, but there is the potential that they may also fail like they have done before".

== Ceasefire ==
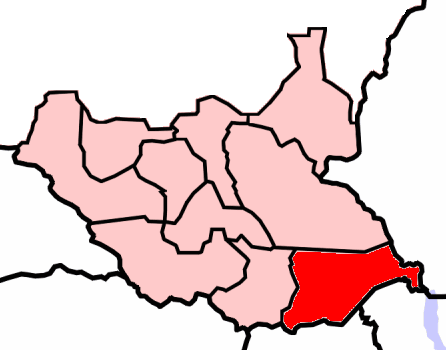
Owiny Ki-Bul is in East Equatoria (in red) bordering Uganda to the south, Kenya to the southeast and Ethiopia to the east.

On 4 August 2006, Vincent Otti declared a unilateral ceasefire and asked the Ugandan government to reciprocate. Ugandan Internal Affairs Minister Ruhakana Rugunda stated that they were waiting to see the effect on the ground. ICC indictee Raska Lukwiya was killed in battle on 12 August 2006; the LRA asked for three days of mourning though a spokesman said that talks would continue. Ugandan President Museveni set a 12 September 2006 deadline to finalize a peace deal. The government and LRA signed a truce on 26 August 2006. Under the terms of the agreement, LRA forces were required to leave Uganda and gather in two assembly areas, where the Ugandan government promised they would not attack and the government of Southern Sudan guaranteed their safety. Once this is accomplished, talks on a comprehensive peace agreement would begin. Although a final agreement was not reached by the 12 August deadline, LRA rebels began gathering in the assembly areas and the government delegation stated that they would not hold to the deadline. Machar stated that several hundred rebels, including Otti, had gathered either at Ri-Kwangba in West Equatoria or Owiny Ki-Bul in East Equatoria.

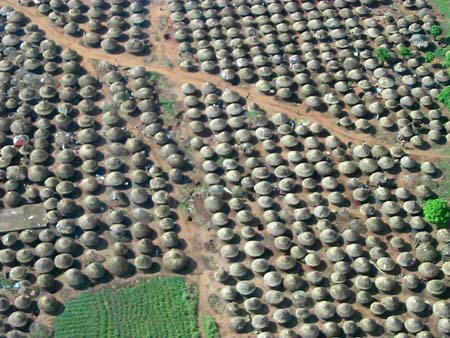
Huts in the Kitgum IDP camp are tightly packed together

The government also began a process of creating "satellite camps" to decongest the main internally displaced person (IDP) camps. In Pader, 28 satellite sites were occupied out of 48 identified as of late September 2006, while the numbers in Kitgum were 21 of 36. IDPs farther south in Teso and Lango were being encouraged to return home directly. However, talks continued to be delayed. On 23 September, the LRA delegation threatened to walk out of the negotiations, claiming that the UPDF had attacked their forces at Owiny Ki-Bul and demanding that composition of the government delegation be changed and that the ICC warrants be voided before any agreement. Uganda denied the accusation of attacks. Both delegations met with mediator Riek Machar on 25 September 2006, but not with each other.

=== Attacks ===
The negotiations were paused in early October while a Cessation of Hostilities monitoring team was sent to Owiny Ki-Bul. The team found that no attack had taken place, but that the LRA had simply moved away from the designated site. The team recommended that the LRA rebels regroup at Owiny Ki-Bul, while stating that the LRA had not honored the agreement and was using hostile propaganda, that the UPDF was located close to the assembly points and that the mediators had failed to provide armed guards for the assembled rebels. On 11 October 2006, the LRA proposed that Uganda adopt a federalist structure, prompting criticism from the government spokesperson.

On 20 October 2006, Ugandan President Yoweri Museveni traveled to Juba to meet the LRA negotiators face-to-face for the first time in an attempt to revive the talks, described as "stalled" by BBC News and "faltering" by The Monitor newspaper. A Uganda government source reported that the president spoke angrily and rebuked the LRA team several times, before later referring to the LRA as "unserious" in a subsequent address to South Sudan government officials. A pall had been thrown over the talks by the murder of several dozen civilians, including the shooting of women and children in the head, near Juba during the two previous days. The attacks were carried out by an as-yet unnamed group, but some suspected that the LRA was responsible for the mayhem.

After a week-long impasse, the LRA and government signed a second truce on 1 November 2006 that mandated the monitoring team until 1 December. The previous agreement had technically expired in September. As part of the agreement, the army was to withdraw from Owiny Ki-Bul, past a 30-km (18-mi) buffer zone. The LRA was given a week to regroup at Owiny Ki-Bul, and four weeks to gather at Ri-Kwangba. Both Kony and Otti refused to enter the camps, citing fear of arrest on the ICC warrants. The agreement further stated that food would not be provided to LRA units outside the assembly points except in "exceptional circumstances".

In one of the most significant moments for the LRA during the talks, United Nations Undersecretary-General for Humanitarian Affairs and Emergency Relief Coordinator Jan Egeland met with Kony and Otti in the hopes of pushing the talks forward on 12 November 2006. Egeland had previously stated that he would meet with Kony only if the LRA released abducted children and wounded members, but Kony denied that anyone in the LRA was either wounded or held against their will.

The LRA declared that it was withdrawing from the talks on November 30, stating that UPDF had killed three of its fighters. The deadline for the LRA fighters to finish gathering at the assembly points was 1 December. Uganda denied the charge. Also, outgoing United Nations Secretary-General Kofi Annan appointed Joaquim Chissano, former president of Mozambique, to be the UN envoy to the conflict. The truce was further extended for two more months on 18 December.

On 12 January 2007 Ojul stated that recent comments made by al-Bashir and Kiir clearly signified that the LRA was not welcome any longer in Sudan, and that further talks should occur in Kenya instead. On 14 March 2007 the LRA stated it would once again return to the Juba talks. After South Africa, Kenya and Mozambique agreed to join the peace talks (a demand the LRA had made before it would return to Juba), the next round of talks was held from 13 April to 14 April 2007. In this round, the ceasefire was extended until 30 June 2007, and Ri Kwangba was the agreed upon assembly point. The next round of talks was set for 25 April 2007.

== Resumption ==
Following this suspension in the peace talks, the Juba Initiative Project enabled the resumption of the talks in May 2007, thanks to the efforts of the Special Representative of the Secretary-General for LRA-affected areas Joaquim Chissano. The talks were again mediated by the Government of Southern Sudan, but with the support of the United Nations and logistic facilitation from the Office for the Coordination of Humanitarian Affairs (OCHA), under the leadership of her local head Eliane Duthoit.

On 29 June 2007, the sides agreed to the principles of how justice and reconciliation will be handled, the third of the five-point agenda. The LRA and government agreed that both formal justice procedures and the traditional Mato Oput ceremony of reconciliation would play a role. Government delegation spokesperson Barigye Ba-Hoku stated that they would attempt to convince the ICC that this would address their concerns about impunity and that arrests under ICC auspices would not be necessary. In November 2007, an LRA delegation led by Martin Ojul journeyed to Kampala to restate their commitment to a peaceful resolution of the conflict. Ojul later led the delegation on a tour of northern Uganda to meet victims of the insurgency and ask their forgiveness. However, reports surfaced that LRA deputy commander Otti had been executed on or around 8 October 2007 over an internal power struggle with Kony.

On 20 December 2007 the government set an ultimatum for the peace talks to conclude by 31 January 2008, threatening that a new military offensive otherwise. The death of Vincent Otti, confirmed in mid-January 2008, was reported to threaten the success of the talks. Talks resumed on 30 January 2008, and the ceasefire was extended until 29 February 2008. The European Union and the United States joined the negotiations, increasing the number of observers to eight.

A breakthrough in negotiations was reached on 3 February 2008 regarding accountability and reconciliation. A deal was signed on 19 February 2008 which decided that the war crimes would be tried in a special section of the High Court of Uganda, thus bypassing the International Criminal Court and also removing one of the last obstacles to a final peace deal. On 22 February 2008, the rebels walked out of the talks again after being denied senior government posts. However, shortly thereafter they signed another breakthrough agreement according to which they "would be considered for government and army posts", but not automatically appointed. A permanent ceasefire to come into effect 24 hours after the signing a comprehensive peace treaty (expected by 29 February 2008) was agreed upon on 23 February 2008.

More problems appeared on 28 February 2008: The rebels demand a retraction of the ICC indictments, but the Ugandan government only wants to ask the UN to do that after the rebels have demobilised. An accord on Disarmament, Demobilisation and Reintegration was signed late on 29 February 2008, leaving the signing of the peace treaty itself as the last missing action.

The truce was extended until 28 March 2008, and the final peace talks will continue on 12 March 2008. The ICC prosecutor-general Luis Moreno-Ocampo on 5 March 2008 rejected demands by the rebels for a meeting, stating that "arrest warrants issued by the court... remain in effect and have to be executed". it was reported that rebel leader Kony would nonetheless come out of the bush to sign the peace agreement on 28 March 2008, with the implicit agreement that he will not be apprehended and transferred to the ICC while out in the open; such an action was also thought to likely see a remobilisation of his rebel army. Furthermore, it was suggested that Uganda should lobby at the United Nations Security Council to suspend the ICC indictments for a year.

On 12 March 2008, as final talks were set to continue, the ICC inquired as to the precise definition of the powers of the proposed intra-Ugandan war crimes court section, in a move seen as softening the indictments on the LRA rebels. The final signing of the peace deal was delayed on 26 March 2008 from 28 March 2008 to 3 April 2008; while the ceasefire was not formally extended with this deadline, both parties were expected to continue adhering to it. The signing was then further delayed to 5 April 2008. It was later announced that Kony would sign the deal in the bush two days before that. However, this was postponed to 10 April 2008; reportedly, Kony was suffering from diarrhoea.

The ICC inquired as to the precise nature of the special courts in Uganda. Kony delayed the signing of the final treaty further on 10 April 2008, reportedly asking for more information about what kind of punishments he could face. He later clarified that he wanted to know further details about how mato-oput, the Acholi traditional justice, would be used, and how exactly the special division of the High Court would work; he then suspended the peace talks and appointed a new negotiating team, claiming to "have been misled". Specifically, Kony fired chief LRA negotiator David Nyakorach Matsanga and replaced him with James Obita. Kony subsequently failed to show up at Nabanga to sign the treaty.

== Collapse ==
The government subsequently stated that they would return to Juba and Kampala, as the LRA had broken the agreement, and that the ceasefire agreement would not be extended. The next steps of both sides are unclear. Diplomats unsuccessfully tried to restart the talks on 26 April 2008. On 26 May 2008 the government set up a special war crimes court with the mandate to try the LRA in an attempt to convince the ICC to withdraw its indictments against LRA leaders.

Since April 2008, the LRA had begun rearming and abducting recruits, with the BBC stating that 1000 new abductees had been added to the 600 old LRA fighters by June. Lord's Resistance Army negotiator James Obita stated that on 4 June 2008, the Southern Sudan army attacked an LRA encampment killing two, though this is unconfirmed. On 5 June 2008, the LRA attacked the Sudan People's Liberation Army/Movement (SPLA) camp at Nabanga, killing 21, seven soldiers and 14 civilians, before killing a local chief in the nearby village of Yamba. The LRA fighters burnt the SPLA camp before returning to Ri-Kwangba. This occurred as Kony reappointed Matsanga as chief negotiator. Matsanga claimed on 6 June to have contacted UN Envoy Joaquim Chissano to revive the talks; Chissano subsequently arrived in Kampala for talks with President Museveni on 7 June. However, the Government of Southern Sudan announced on 8 June that they would no longer mediate, with Information Minister Gabriel Changson Cheng noting that there were multiple reasons for the decision, including the recent attack and the apparent lack of interest in the peace process on the part of the Ugandan government. The governments of the nations in which the LRA is active met earlier in the week and all suggested military action.

In December 2008 the United Nations Security Council agreed with a Joaquim Chissano's recommendation that the peace efforts should continue will continuing to support the ICC arrest warrants.
