= 2024 Haute-Kotto raid =

2024 military engagement in Haute-Kotto, Central African Republic

- Part of the Central African Republic Civil War and Lord's Resistance Army insurgency
Date	7 April 2024
Location	"Yemen" camp, Haute-Kotto, Central African Republic 7.963446258035361°N 23.53341340499359°E
Result	Inconclusive: Failure to arrest Joseph Kony

Belligerents
Russia: Wagner Group	Lord's Resistance Army; Coalition of Patriots for Change

Commanders and leaders
Unknown	Joseph Kony (LRA); Ousmane (CPC)

Casualties and losses
Rebel claim: 2 PMCs killed	Russian claim: 9 fighters (including three senior members) killed
- Rebel claim: 2 civilians killed

On 7 April 2024 Russian mercenaries from the Wagner Group conducted an operation in the Haute-Kotto prefecture of the Central African Republic near the town of Sam Ouandja to apprehend the leader of the Lord's Resistance Army, Joseph Kony. While managing to kill some fighters, the operation failed to find the group leader due to him having left earlier for another base.

== Background ==
Following the outbreak of the 2023 Sudanese civil war, a group of Lord's Resistance Army (LRA) fighters led by Joseph Kony moved from Kafia Kingi to a mountainous zone in the Haute-Kotto Prefecture. The move brought the group closer to the towns in the Central African Republic and allowed some group members, who were held against their will, to escape the group.

The group settled in a rebel camp named Yemen. Yemen was set up by a Sudanese trader named Alico, who has been known to manage the cultivation of large cannabis fields near Sam Ouandja. Other traffickers had also established themselves in the area, which has become a market for Fulani pastoralists as well as armed groups, including Chadians, Sudanese, individuals from the Central African Republic, and LRA.

In late March 2024, 14 male LRA defectors arrived in two different communities in the Sam Ouandja locality. The defectors then joined together and travelled to Yangou-Pendéré, a mining site controlled by a supposed Chadian armed group allied with the government forces. The next day, Russian instructors arrested and handcuffed the 14 LRA defectors. A total of 23 former LRA hostages and combatants arrived in Sam Ouandja during that period. National defence forces together with other security personnel transported 11 of them to Bangui on 1 April and subsequently handed them over to an international non-governmental organization (NGO) on 29 April for repatriation to their countries of origin.

== Raid ==
On 7 April 2024, the Russian paramilitary force carried out a coordinated air and ground attack on Yemen camp, around 70 km (43 mi) south-east of Sam Ouandja. The group first bombed the camp using two helicopters, followed by a ground operation during which the entire village and several surrounding it were burned. According to locals in a firefight between two and eight people were killed, while according to CPC general Ousmane, at least four people were killed including two civilians and two Russians. UPC/CPC sources confirmed that members of their armed groups had been killed in the attack. According to sources close to the Wagner Group a colonel, two generals as well as six fighters of the group were killed and weapons and ammunition were seized. A few people, including a local chief, were arrested.

The main target may have been Joseph Kony, who had recently been at the site. However, on the day of the attack, Kony had reportedly already returned to his own base some 15–18 km (9.3–11.2 mi) south-east of Yemen camp. Russian mercenaries tried to capture him, but only got close to one of his bases. According to reports, Kony and a group of around 71 fighters, not counting women and children, fled to Sudan. According to general Ousmane, Kony was still present in the area as of 8 April 2024.
