= Salim Kony =

Ugandan militant, son of Joseph Kony

- Born: c. 1991–1992
- Parent: Joseph Kony
- Military career
- Allegiance: Lord's Resistance Army
- Service years: ?-2022
- Conflicts: Lord's Resistance Army insurgency

Salim Saleh Kony (born c. 1991 – 1992) is a Ugandan militant, smuggler, trader, and LRA defector. He is the son of LRA leader Joseph Kony.

== Biography ==
Salim Saleh Kony was born around 1991–1992, and his father is Joseph Kony. He was named after the Ugandan general and Museveni's brother, Salim Saleh. He earned the rank of sergeant at age five. On 30 July 2006, Kony appointed his 14 years old son, Salim, as the LRA's representative at the peace talks between the group and Ugandan government on the Democratic Republic of the Congo–South Sudan border.

In 2010, Salim joined the LRA's leadership board and was a captain. At first, he was responsible for his father's security, and in 2014 he was appointed field commander. As a field commander, he was tasked with planning the group's attacks and defensive measures and enforcing control over LRA members alongside Ali Kony. In enforcing the group's order, he reportedly killed the group members who wanted to defect. Moreover, he, alongside Ali and Otim Larwedo, also commanded the LRA's small group consisting of 35 fighters and 15 women. He was named as a potential successor to Kony.

In addition to being the field commander, Salim became the LRA's ivory smuggler. He was responsible for transporting the ivory from the LRA's camp in the Central African Republic to Kafia Kingi. In 2014, he participated in elephant poaching in Garamba National Park. The following year, he transported 20 ivory tusks from the DRC to Kafia Kingi.

The US Treasury imposed sanctions on Salim on 23 August 2016. He then ordered the execution of three commanders, and his decision created tension between him and the group members. Hearing of this tension, his father decided to detain him, causing him to defect from the LRA in late 2022. His defection created a power vacuum in the LRA and weakened its command structure. As of October 2025, he was reported to be working as a trader in Songo and had links with Rapid Support Forces (RSF).

== Bibliography ==
- Cakaj, Ledio (4 November 2015). Tusk Wars: Inside the LRA and the Bloody Business of Ivory (PDF) (Report).
- Invisible Children (September 2025). The LRA's Final Chapter: Progress demobilizing the Lord's Resistance Army, the continued threat of child abductions, and the future of Joseph Kony (PDF) (Report).
- Titeca, Kristof (October 2025). "Kony 2025: the Survival of the Lord's Resistance Army in the Car–Sudan–DRC Borderlands". African Affairs. 124 (497).
