= Ri-Kwangba =

Site in West Equatoria, South Sudan

Ri-Kwangba is a site in West Equatoria, South Sudan, near the border with the Democratic Republic of the Congo. It, along with Owiny Ki-Bul, is one of two assembly points for the rebel Lord's Resistance Army (LRA) under the Cessation of Hostilities Agreement agreed to by the LRA and government of Uganda on 26 August 2006.

In September 2006, the only structures at the location, which was essentially a 200-by-300 meter clearing in the jungle, were five huts. June 2007 peace talks held in Ri-Kwangba resulted in an improvement of facilities, in order to handle the gathering of delegates.
