= School Student Union of Norway =

Norwegian student rights organisation

School Student Union of Norway (Norwegian: Elevorganisasjonen, SSUN or EO) is a Norwegian student rights organisation. The organization is politically independent and has (as of May 2014) around 400 member schools, in which there are over 170,000 students. It is organized nationally by a central organ and has a county board in all of the 11 counties, all operated by students themselves. It is currently the only organization of its kind in Norway and has the slogan "By, with and for students".

SSUN was founded in 1959 and is responsible for the Operation Day's work campaign in Norway. It has been held since 1964.

== Sources ==
- Official website
