= Invisible Children, Inc. =

Organization concerning the Lord's Resistance Army in Africa

- Founded: 2004
- Founder: Bobby Bailey, Laren Poole, Jason Russell
- Location: United States, Democratic Republic of Congo, Central African Republic
- Origins: San Diego, California
- Region served: Central African Republic, Democratic Republic of the Congo, South Sudan, and Uganda
- Key people: Ben Keesey, Laren Poole, Jason Russell
- Revenue: $4,876,051 (2018)
- Website: invisiblechildren.com

Invisible Children, Inc., founded in 2004, is an organization to increase awareness of the activities of the Lord's Resistance Army (LRA) in Central Africa, and its leader, Joseph Kony. Specifically, the group seeks to put an end to the practices of the LRA, which include abductions and abuse of children, and forcing them to serve as soldiers. To this end, Invisible Children urges the United States government to take military action in the central region of Africa. Invisible Children also operates as a charitable organization, soliciting donations and selling merchandise to raise money for its cause. The organization promotes its cause by dispensing films on the internet and presenting in high schools and colleges around the United States.

When the organization was founded, the LRA was active in Uganda. The rebel group left Uganda in 2006 and continues to operate in the Democratic Republic of the Congo, the Central African Republic, and South Sudan. Invisible Children advocated for the passing of the Lord's Resistance Army Disarmament and Northern Uganda Recovery Act, a piece of legislation which led to the deployment of 100 combat-equipped US soldiers to the region for the purpose of advising the local forces in tracking and capturing Joseph Kony. The United Nations Security Council met in November of that year to discuss the LRA. Internationally, journalists began to seek more information about the conditions in Central Africa at that time.

The group has received both praise and criticism for its methods. While the organization's films have won several awards, its use of funds, projection of facts, and support of the SPLA and the Uganda People's Defence Force have come into question as these two groups have been known to commit similar atrocities to those blamed on the LRA. In March 2012, Invisible Children began an online video campaign called Kony 2012, the purpose being to promote the charity's 'Stop Kony' movement to make indicted Ugandan war criminal Joseph Kony internationally known in order to arrest him in 2012.

Invisible Children underwent restructuring in late 2014. Foreign Policy in 2017 reported that Invisible Children had become closely connected with military operations, including intelligence gathering.

== Background ==
In 1985, Ugandan dictator Apolo Milton Obote (28 December 1925 – 10 October 2005) was overthrown by his own military commanders. Although he was from the Lango ethnic group, the soldiers who made up his army were primarily from the Acholi region, in northern Uganda. He was replaced by Tito Okello (1914–1996), the president of Uganda who was Acholi. Okello was deposed in 1986 and the leader of the National Resistance Army, Yoweri Museveni, became president, after questionable elections. The Acholi were resistant to the authority of the new president who "launched a brutal search-and-destroy mission against former government soldiers throughout the north, which swept up many innocent Acholi in its wake.

Several resistance groups emerged and most were put down, but the LRA survived. In the early 2000s, media attention was drawn to the region when thousands of children affected by the LRA activities took refuge in Gulu, Uganda. The government of Uganda forced the Acholi into "what were effectively concentration camps". These camps were ridden with disease and the inhabitants were not able to continue farming.

The attention the conditions in Uganda received revealed that over the previous 20 years the LRA was abducting children and using them as kadogo (child soldiers), a practice in which the Museveni government had also engaged. In 2005, an arrest warrant was issued for Joseph Kony by the International Criminal Court "for crimes against humanity and war crimes".

After failed peace negotiations with the Ugandan government in 2006, the LRA left Uganda retreating to southern Sudan, the Democratic Republic of the Congo and the Central African Republic, where they continued to "wreak havoc". In May 2010, President Barack Obama signed the "Lord's Resistance Army Disarmament and Northern Uganda Recovery Act". This law led to the deployment of US troops in the region in October 2011. Shortly thereafter, the United Nations Security Council met to discuss the LRA. Internationally, journalists set out to inform themselves about the conditions in the region.

== History ==
With the intent to film a documentary about the War in Darfur, college students Jason Russell, Bobby Bailey, and Laren Poole traveled to Africa in 2003. Russell had recently graduated from film school at the University of Southern California, and after hearing from locals that gunmen had shot at the truck in front of him while driving in northern Uganda, he learned about Joseph Kony and the Lord's Resistance Army. After the incident, the group decided instead to focus on the civil war affecting the region. After returning home to the United States, the group created a documentary titled Invisible Children: The Rough Cut, which aims to expose the plight of child soldiers and night commuters of northern Uganda. The film was originally shown to the group's friends and family, but eventually reached millions. The three believed that the world was unaware of the conditions in Uganda and the plight of the children they met there.

The young men set out on a mission to expose what they had witnessed in Uganda, screening their film at hundreds of high schools, colleges, and churches throughout the United States. In 2004 the group founded Invisible Children, Inc. as a non-profit charitable organization. They solicit donations and sell merchandise such as bracelets, T-shirts, and posters to raise money for their cause. The money they raise is used in part, to produce awareness films, and for humanitarian aid to northern Uganda.

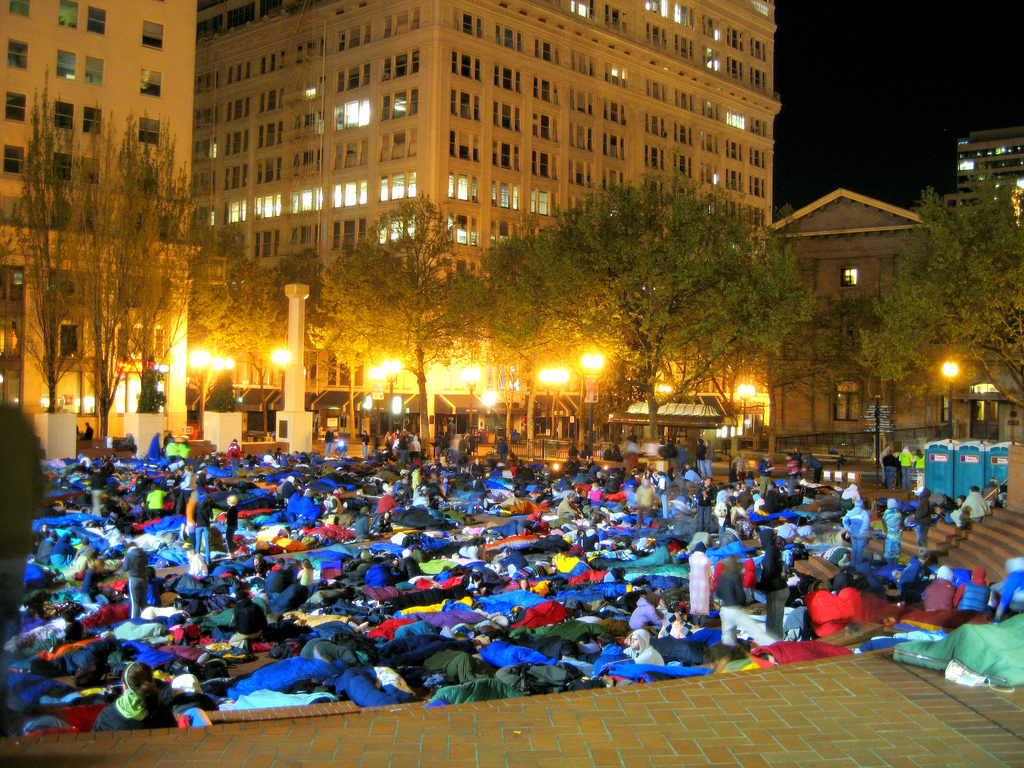
Invisible Children, Inc. supporters in Portland, Oregon, participating in a Global Night Commute on April 29, 2006. The participants sleep in a public place to simulate children in Uganda sleeping in a city center to avoid capture by the Lord's Resistance Army.

In April 2007, the group organized an event called "Displace Me", in which 67,000 activists throughout the United States slept in the streets in makeshift cardboard villages, hoping to raise awareness about those displaced by the Ugandan government. Later in 2007, American rock band Fall Out Boy filmed a music video for the song "I'm Like a Lawyer with the Way I'm Always Trying to Get You Off (Me & You)" in Uganda after hearing of the organization's cause. Fall Out Boy originally intended to create a documentary-style film, but decided to focus on a love story between two Ugandan children, opining that the treatment "seemed a lot more dangerous and compelling. I mean, have you ever seen a love story between Ugandan people—especially with a rock band—on 'TRL'?" Invisible Children co-founder Bobby Bailey referred to the video as "groundbreaking".

Although the LRA left Uganda in 2006 after failed peace negotiations with the government, in March 2012, Invisible Children, Inc. continued to create new awareness programs. In May 2010, President Barack Obama signed the "Lord's Resistance Army Disarmament and Northern Uganda Recovery Act". Invisible Children was one of the advocacy groups that influenced the passing of the bill. Representatives of Invisible Children and other groups were present in the Oval Office when the President Barack Obama signed the law. The President told those in attendance "We have seen your reporting, your websites, your blogs, and your video postcards. You have made the plight of the children visible to us all."

In March 2012, Invisible Children began an internet video campaign called Kony 2012, the premise of which was to heighten awareness of the actions of Kony and the LRA in order to put further pressure on the U.S. government to intervene militarily in Central Africa. The campaign focused on "making Kony famous" in order to awaken people to his crimes and the pressure the government into military actions. The production value of the film was praised and it was suggested that the methodology used would be a trend in activism in the future. The video went viral, reaching more than 40 million views in three days after being tweeted by celebrities such as Rihanna, Oprah Winfrey, and Ryan Seacrest. Immediately following the release and success of the internet films in the Kony 2012 program, criticism of the organization's activities and finances surfaced.

== Criticism ==
In an article analyzing why the Obama administration sent US troops to Central Africa in October, 2011, the Council on Foreign Relations (CFR) criticized groups like Invisible Children for "manipulat[ing] facts for strategic purposes, exaggerating the scale of LRA abductions and murders". Resolve, one of Invisible Children's partner organizations, addressed the CFR's accusation as a "serious charge...published with no accompanying substantiation." Jedidiah Jenkins, the director of idea development for Invisible Children, asserted that the numbers of child abductions the charity uses "are often the same numbers as the ones used by Human Rights Watch and the United Nations".

The CFR article went on to say that organizations such as Invisible Children "rarely refer to the Ugandan atrocities or those of Sudan's People's Liberation Army." These ideas were echoed in the Huffington Post by Michael Deibert, author of Democratic Republic of Congo: Between Hope and Despair. Deibert further explained that the Ugandan government itself used child soldiers to gain power. The Washington Post brought up criticism of the organization for its role in the passing of the Lord's Resistance Army Disarmament and Northern Uganda Recovery Act. The law was designed to help bring peace and stability to the region, however, according to the article, "[Critics say] it has strengthened the hand of the Ugandan president, whose security forces have a human rights abuse record of their own". In response, Jenkins said, "If we had the purity to say we will not partner with anyone corrupt, we couldn't partner with anyone."

The organization has been criticized for oversimplifying a complex and multi-faceted issue. Of major concern is that US troops are already deployed in an operation that should be secret. The attention that is being brought the region now may actually do harm. It is assumed that Joseph Kabila, the President of the Congo, would not respond favorably to foreign troops crossing his borders. For this reason, the attention that the Kony 2012 film is bringing could incite violence. "If you want to catch Kony, I can't think of a dumber thing to do", said Africa expert Peter Pham. Following the release of the film Kony 2012, the group asserted that it hoped to explain the conflict in "an easily understandable format", with CEO Ben Keesey adding that "There are few times where problems are black and white. There's lots of complicated stuff in the world, but Joseph Kony and what he's doing is black and white."

Scrutiny of the distribution of the organization's funds have also emerged, specifically due to information reported by charity watch group Charity Navigator. Charity Navigator currently has Invisible Children rated three out of four stars overall (two out of four in the category of "financial" and four out of four in the category of "accountability and transparency"). Other critics claimed that the group spends most of the money they collect from their charity on staff salaries and "making films that attract much publicity, but don't do much to help people on the ground." The organization responded to critiques of its spending by providing a breakdown of its finances on its website, which claimed that 80.46% of its money raised was spent on "its mission", with 16% going to administration and management costs.

Another focus for criticism of the organization has been a photograph of the three founders holding weapons and posing with armed members of the SPLA. Invisible Children responded on their website with founder Jason Russell explaining that it was a joke photo taken at the 2008 Juba peace talks in the Democratic Republic of the Congo that would have been "funny to bring back to our friends and family". Glenna Gordon, the photographer who took the picture, is not associated with the organization and was on assignment for the Associated Press at the time. Gordon explained the context of the photograph as the Invisible Children founders being bored at the stalled peace talks and deciding to have some fun posing with weapons and SPLA members. Gordon later published a story about what she saw as their questionable practices.

A documentary made by Jean-Baptiste Renaud, aired on Arte, claimed multiple issues concerning the aims and methods of Invisible Children. It was alleged that the NGO cooperated with the Army of Uganda by monitoring rebel movements and collecting reconnaissance from remote villages via radio. The film makers further alleged that the organization deliberately named a former local supporter as a coup plotter, leading to his arrest and torture at the hand of the state. Additionally, the claim of the organization being a grassroots movement was questioned by the film makers by exposing numerous financial links with US evangelical fundamentalists.

== Awards ==
- In 2007, Progressive Source Awards, awarded Invisible Children's TRI podcast as the Best Fundraising
- In 2008, Invisible Children was awarded the Human Security Award.
- In 2008, Invisible Children was awarded the People's Voice Webby Award.
- In 2008, Invisible Children received an award from the American Advertising Federation.
- In 2008, Invisible Children received one of the Summit Awards, specifically in the category of Summit Creative Award, for its Schools for Schools website and its Displace Me website.
- In 2009, in collaboration with Digitaria, Invisible Children received an award for The Rescue website from the Interactive Media Awards.
- In 2009, Invisible Children was nominated for the Think Social Award.
- In 2010 and 2011, Invisible Children won the Stay Classy Award for Most Effective Awareness Campaign.
- In 2011, The LRA Crisis Tracker (a joint project between Invisible Children, Resolve, and Digitaria) was awarded Best in Show at the 2011 MediaPost Creative Media Awards.
- In 2013, Kony 2012 was awarded "Digital Campaign of the Year" under Interactive Awards at SXSW.

== Filmography ==
The organization's founding was catalyzed by Invisible Children, the documentary that the founders filmed and edited in 2003.

Film	Release	Director(s)	Bracelet Color
Invisible Children: The Rough Cut	2004	Bobby Bailey	N/A
Innocent: The Story of a Night Commuter	2005	N/A	White
Grace: The Story of a Child Mother	2006	Danica Russell, Vanessa Contopulos, Noelle Jouglet, Katie Bradel	Green
Emmy: The Story of an Orphan	2006	Bobby Bailey	Red
Sunday: The Story of a Displaced Child	2007	Bobby Bailey	Black
Go	2008	Laren Poole	N/A
Roseline: The Story of an AIDS Victim	2008	Jason Russell	Blue
Together We Are Free	2009	Jason Russell	N/A
The Rescue	2009	Jason Russell	Grey
Tony	2010	Jason Russell	Brown
Kony 2012	2012	Jason Russell	N/A

== See also ==
- Ugandan diaspora
