= Jason Russell =

American actor and activist

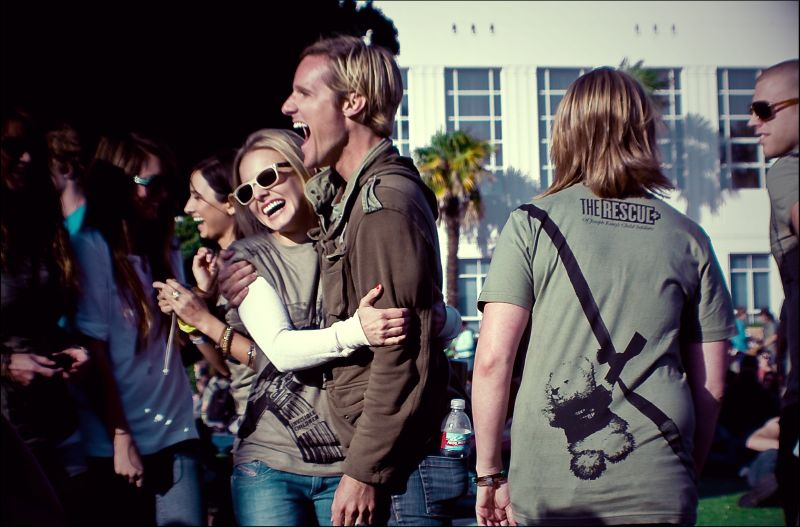
- Russell and Kristen Bell in 2009
- Born: October 12, 1978 (age 47); El Cajon, California, U.S.
- Education: USC School of Cinematic Arts
- Occupations: Film director, charity worker, activist
- Known for: Kony 2012
- Board member of: Invisible Children, Inc.
- Spouse: Danica Jones (m. 2004)
- Children: 2
- Relatives: Ryan Hansen (brother-in-law)

Jason Russell (born October 12, 1978) is an American film and theater director, choreographer, and activist who co-founded Invisible Children, Inc. He is the director of Kony 2012, a short documentary film that went viral in the beginning of March 2012. In the first two weeks following its release, the documentary gained more than 83 million views on YouTube and became the subject of media scrutiny and criticism. Its subject is the Ugandan rebel leader Joseph Kony, his alleged war crimes, and the movement to bring him to the International Criminal Court.

== Early life and education ==
Russell is the younger son of Sheryl (née Hortman) and Paul Russell, co-founders of Christian Youth Theater, which Russell was part of as a child. Russell discussed acting in an interview when he was 13 years old: "That was my life. It was what everybody around me did. I didn't even think about it. I did my first show at 8, and I have done over 20 plays since. You can't do this if you don't like it. You have to commit yourself to it."

Russell graduated from the USC School of Cinematic Arts.

== Career ==
Russell, with Bobby Bailey and Laren Poole, created the Invisible Children organization in 2006 after they "traveled to Uganda and witnessed children camping out in the city of Gulu to avoid being kidnapped into the militia in their villages." With camera equipment obtained from eBay, they went to Uganda as student filmmakers but had no plan for the focus of their intended documentary. According to Russell, the trip was inspired by the 1993 death of Dan Eldon, who had been beaten to death while trying to document the ongoing famine in Somalia.

After Russell's group reached the Sudan their caravan was attacked by the Lord's Resistance Army, forcing a retreat to Northern Uganda. In Gulu, Russell and the others interviewed and videotaped children who had to commute to the city every night to elude raids by the LRA on their home villages in Acholiland. During filming, the three men contracted malaria, but omitted covering their illness so that the documentary would remain focused on the children. The footage they shot resulted in the original Invisible Children documentary draft, which was first screened in June 2004.

Russell and others returned to Uganda for six months in 2005 to collect more interviews and documentation for the next Invisible Children documentary. In 2006, after the Washington D.C. screening of Russell and Poole's rough cut, the U.S. Congress approved discussion of the plight of the Acholi before the Congressional Human Rights Caucus. The 2006 Invisible Children: Rough Cut also won Russell, Bailey, and Poole the Pioneering Spirit Award at the 2007 Heartland Film Festival.

With his wife Danica Jones and Jon M. Chu, Russell co-wrote a musical, Moxie, which the team sold to Steven Spielberg.

== Personal life ==
On October 23, 2004, he married Danica Jones in La Jolla, California. They have two children.

Russell has a sister, Amy, who is married to actor Ryan Hansen.

=== Brief psychosis incident ===
On March 15, 2012, at the height of the Kony 2012 video's viral popularity, San Diego police detained a naked Russell at the western corner of the intersection of Ingraham Street and Riviera Road for psychiatric evaluation after he had a public breakdown. Russell was hospitalized for several weeks. A statement by his family said the diagnosis was a "brief reactive psychosis, an acute state brought on by extreme exhaustion, stress and dehydration" as a result of the popularity of the campaign. In October 2012, Russell appeared on the TV show Oprah's Next Chapter to discuss the incident, describing it as an "out-of-body experience" and stating "that wasn't me; [...] that's not who I am".

== Filmography ==
Films	Release
Roseline: The Story of an AIDS Victim	2008
Together We Are Free	2009
The Rescue	2009
Tony	2010
Kony 2012	2012
Move	2012
