= Odek =

Village in Northern Region, Uganda

Odek Village
- Village
- Country: Uganda
- Region: Northern Uganda
- State: Omero
- County: Omero County
- City: Odek
- Village: Odek Village
- District: Gulu

Odek is a village in Omoro District, Northern Uganda. It is reported to be the birthplace of Ugandan terrorist Joseph Kony.
