= Juba Initiative Project =

The Juba Initiative Project is an ad hoc funding mechanism funded by several world donors, to support the peace talks between the Government of Uganda and the opposition group Lord's Resistance Army, which resumed in Juba, Southern Sudan, in May 2007.

The revived talks, mediated and hosted by the Government of Southern Sudan, are supported by the Special Representative of the United Nations Secretary-General for LRA-affected areas, Joaquim Chissano. Logistic support is provided by the United Nations Office for the Coordination of Humanitarian Affairs, whose Juba office is headed by Eliane Duthoit. OCHA manages the fund on behalf of the Southern Sudan Government.
