= Operation Day's Work =

Operation Day's Work is a solidarity program based on volunteering by high school students. It was first implemented in Sweden to honor the former Secretary-General of the United Nations, Dag Hammarskjöld.

During Operation Day's Work (also called Solidarity Action Day), students get the chance to exercise a job of their choice instead of going to school for one day. They donate their salaries to youth-related projects from all over the world. Today there are Operation Day's Work organisations in several countries.

Multiple Operation Day's Work organisations have engaged in the SAME network (SAME). Within this network, all the committees have agreed to the terms of the network's basic common principles and quality guidelines. These documents ensure the ecological, economic and social sustainability of the committee and their supported projects as well as the independence of any political party or religion, and include more values and principles of the organisations.

== Countries with a national Operation Day's Work committee ==
=== Denmark ===
The national committee was formally founded in 1984.

Instructions from the department of Education specifically state that no student can be forced to take part. The pay for their work goes to a chosen project in a development country. Due to a recent agreement with the Danish Ministry of Education the students are no longer considered to be truant during this day.

Year	Country supported	Year	Country supported	Year	Country supported
1985	Tanzania	1996	Ladakh	2004	Nicaragua, Honduras or Guatemala
1986	Nicaragua	1997	Guatemala	2005	Kirgisistan
1988	Namibia	1998	Palæstina	2006	South Africa
1990	Eritrea	1999	South Sudan	2007	Bolivia
1991	Brazil	2000	Romani people	2008	Niger
1992	Somalia	2001	Mexico	2009	Zimbabwe
1994	Ecuador	2002	Nepal	2010	Burma
1995	Mozambique	2003	Cambodia	2011	Peru
2012	Iraq	2013	Sierra Leone	2014	Kenya
2015	Somaliland	2016	Guatemala	2017	Dhaka
2018	Greenland	2019	Uganda	2020	Peru

=== Finland ===
The national committee in Finland is called Taksvärkki ry/Operation a Day's Work (ODW) Finland. Taksvärkki ry is a non-governmental organization (NGO) whose objective is to improve the living conditions and promote the human rights of children and young people in developing countries and to encourage Finnish young people towards global solidarity. Taksvärkki ry has implemented development cooperation projects since 1967 with funds raised by Finnish schoolchildren and students. ODW Finland also provides free development education material for schools in Finland. The campaign for the school year 2018–2019 is for active youth in Zambia. The patron of the Taksvärkki campaign is President Tarja Halonen.

=== Germany ===
In Germany there a few organizations which organize the Solidarity Action Days.

The biggest and oldest one is called Schüler Helfen Leben (Students Helping Life), founded in 1992 when war in the Balkans started. Even today this organization runs youth projects in Balkan Region. Schüler Helfen Leben is also the only Day's Work organization in Germany where only students and young volunteers organize the Solidarity Action Day, and is therefore also the only one which is part of SAME. Over the years more than 1,000,000 students earned more than 20,000,000 Euros and realized more than 150 youth projects all over the western Balkans. The Patron of the Solidarity Action Day is the German chancellor Angela Merkel.

Another organization is called "Aktion Tagwerk". This organization is part of the Human Help Network and organizes the social day for children in Africa.

=== Italy ===
In Italy, there are two organizations that facilitate a Day's Work.

One of them is based in South Tirol, "Operation Daywork". It was founded with aid from Denmark. Operation Daywork works with both Italian speaking schools and with German speaking schools.

The second organization is also based in the North, in Veneto. It works with Italian schools and the organisation is called Social Day.

=== Belgium ===
The Belgian national committee is called 'YOUCA' (Youth for Change and Action), and was formerly known as "Zuiddag." It was founded in 2006, inspired by the similar Norwegian organization. The Belgian organisation only works with schools in the Flanders Region and Brussels Capital Region.

=== Norway ===
Operation Day's Work (Norwegian: Operasjon Dagsverk) is administered by the School Student Union of Norway and was first held in 1964. The official page provide an oversight of earlier projects:

Year	Country supported	Year	Country supported	Year	Country supported	Year	Country supported
1964	Algeria	1967	Peru	1968	Ceylon	1969	Zambia
1970	Zambia	1971	Guinea Bissau and Angola	1972	Portuguese Empire in Africa	1973	Bangladesh
1974	Tanzania	1975	Botswana	1976	Sudan	1977	Brazil
1978	Cambodian refugees in Thailand	1979	Jamaica	1980	Refugees from Eritrea in Sudan	1981	Afghanistan
1982	Zimbabwe	1983	Nicaragua	1984	Bolivia and Ecuador	1985	Namibia
1987	Eritrea	1988	South Africa and Mozambique	1989	Peru	1990	Support for education in freedom
1991	Brazil and Chile	1992	Costa Rica, Ecuador, Bolivia and Brazil	1993	Cambodia	1994	South Africa
1995	Brazil	1996	Afghanistan	1997	Brazil	1998	Tanzania, Zanzibar, Malawi and Uganda
1999	Girls all over the world	2000	South Africa, Zimbabwe, Bolivia and Nicaragua	2001	Indonesia, New Guinea and Malaysia	2002	Sierra Leone
2003	Ceylon	2004	South Africa	2005	Brazil	2006	Nepal
2007	Guatemala, Honduras and Nicaragua	2008	Bangladesh	2009	Malawi, Mombasa; Uganda and South Africa	2010	Brazil
2011	Rwanda	2012	Nepal	2013	Guatemala, Honduras and Mexico	2014	Etiopia and Malawi
2015	Argentina, Chile and Peru	2016	Colombia	2017	Nigeria	2018	Palestine

=== Sweden ===
Sweden was the first country to establish this event. Since 1962 the national committee has been under control of a student organization called "Sveriges Elevråds Centralorganiastion, SECO." There has been a power struggle inside the SECO organization and the government has demanded oversight over the collection of the money.

The campaign for 2010 supported schools in Sudan.

=== United States ===
The national committee is called "Operation Day's Work". It was founded in 1999. According to their website they have been involved in the projects listed below.

Year	Country supported	Year	Country supported	Year	Country supported	Year	Country supported
1998–1999	Haiti	1999–2000	El Salvador	2000	Nepal	2002	Ethiopia
2003	Bangladesh	2004	Sierra Leone	2005	Vietnam		

Another organization called Schools for Schools is based on the same concept.
