= Ali Kony =

Ugandan militant, son of Joseph Kony

- Born: 1 January 1994 (age 32); Gulu, Uganda
- Other names: Caesar; Bashir
- Parent(s): Joseph Kony (father); Medina Akulu (mother)
- Military career
- Allegiance: Lord's Resistance Army
- Service years: 2005–2021
- Rank: Brigadier
- Conflicts: Lord's Resistance Army insurgency

Ali Ssalongo Kony (born 1 January 1994) is a Ugandan militant, LRA defector, and tuk-tuk driver. He is the son of Joseph Kony.

== Life ==
=== Early life ===
Ali Ssalongo Kony was born in Gulu on 1 January 1994 to Joseph Kony and Medina Akulu. Akulu is Kony's third wife, who was abducted in 1989. At the age of six months, Kony abducted him and his mother to the bush, although his mother was against it since she wanted Ali to go to school instead. He suffered from hearing damage due to the attack when he was a baby. During his childhood, he was raised with around 100 Kony children. He claimed that Kony was kind to his children and took such good care of them.

=== LRA member ===
Ali officially joined the LRA in 2005, when he moved to the Democratic Republic of Congo to undergo weapons training under Vincent Otti. He participated in the first battle for LRA in 2009. Until his defection in 2021, he claimed he had participated in more than 100 battles and had never been hit by a bullet. In 2012, he served as a commander of an LRA battalion at the age of 18 after a rapid promotion in rank. He later became a brigadier, earning the nom de guerre "Caesar" and "Bashir". He had three bodyguards and was a merchant who traded ivory, gold, and marijuana from hunters, traders, and farmers, respectively, and sold them to the big merchants in Songo. The US Treasury report stipulated that Kony was tasked with negotiating the ivory price and overseeing its distribution to Joseph Kony for selling. Through the ivory trade, the groups received weapons, food, and ammunition.

Apart from being a merchant, he also served as the group's foreign affairs minister, where he was responsible for forging a non-aggression pact, intelligence exchange, and trade with other armed militias who roamed around the LRA's territory. In October 2014, Ali was reportedly to increase his involvement in the LRA's operational planning. Due to his role in the LRA, the US treasury imposed sanctions on Kony and froze his assets in the US on 23 August 2016 for human rights violations towards civilians in the Central African Republic.

In July 2005, UPDF claimed that Ali, along with Lakati Owor, was killed by a gunshot wound during a clash in Beyogoya-Palabek. However, this claim was unfounded as he was also named in 2017 as a potential successor to lead the LRA in the event his father died.

=== Defection ===
In June 2021, Ali decided to defect from the LRA due to his discord with his father, who often fought with his mother and his desire to start a new life with his children and wife. As night approached, he and his family covertly left the base in Kafia Kingi for Songo because they did not want to raise an alert. As he arrived in Songo, he started his new life. He became a businessman who owned shops and traded gold and cannabis as a middleman. In addition to becoming an entrepreneur, he worked as a farmer and a taxi driver.

In April 2023, a civil war broke out in Sudan. Responding to this turmoil, Ali and his family decided to move to Juba. Amidst the journey to Juba, one of his children got malaria. After weeks of journey, they arrived in Juba with no money. Arriving in Juba, Kony went to the Ugandan Embassy and presented himself as a businessman in Sudan. The Ugandan Embassy then gave Kony a travel permit, and they travelled to Gulu. Upon arriving in Gulu on 1 July, he lived in a rented house with his family.

=== Post-defection ===
Ali and his family met Yoweri Museveni in the State House, Entebbe on 25 August 2023. During the meeting, Museveni promised that he would provide Ali 30 acres of land, a farm, and a house. In June 2024, he joined the Senior Non-Commissioned Officers (SNCO) training course for seven months at Gaddafi Military Barracks, Jinja. After finishing the course, the government did not enlist him in the army.

However, the president's promises had not been materialised and they still struggled to adapt to the new lifestyle in February 2025. In November 2025, The Times reported that Ali worked as a tuk-tuk driver and vegetable farmer and kept a low profile.

== Personal life ==
Kony is married to a Congolese woman named Cecillia Akullu and the couple has four children. He is fluent in Arabic.

== Bibliography ==
- Cakaj, Ledio (4 November 2015). Tusk Wars: Inside the LRA and the Bloody Business of Ivory (PDF) (Report).
