= Global Night Commute =

Worldwide event

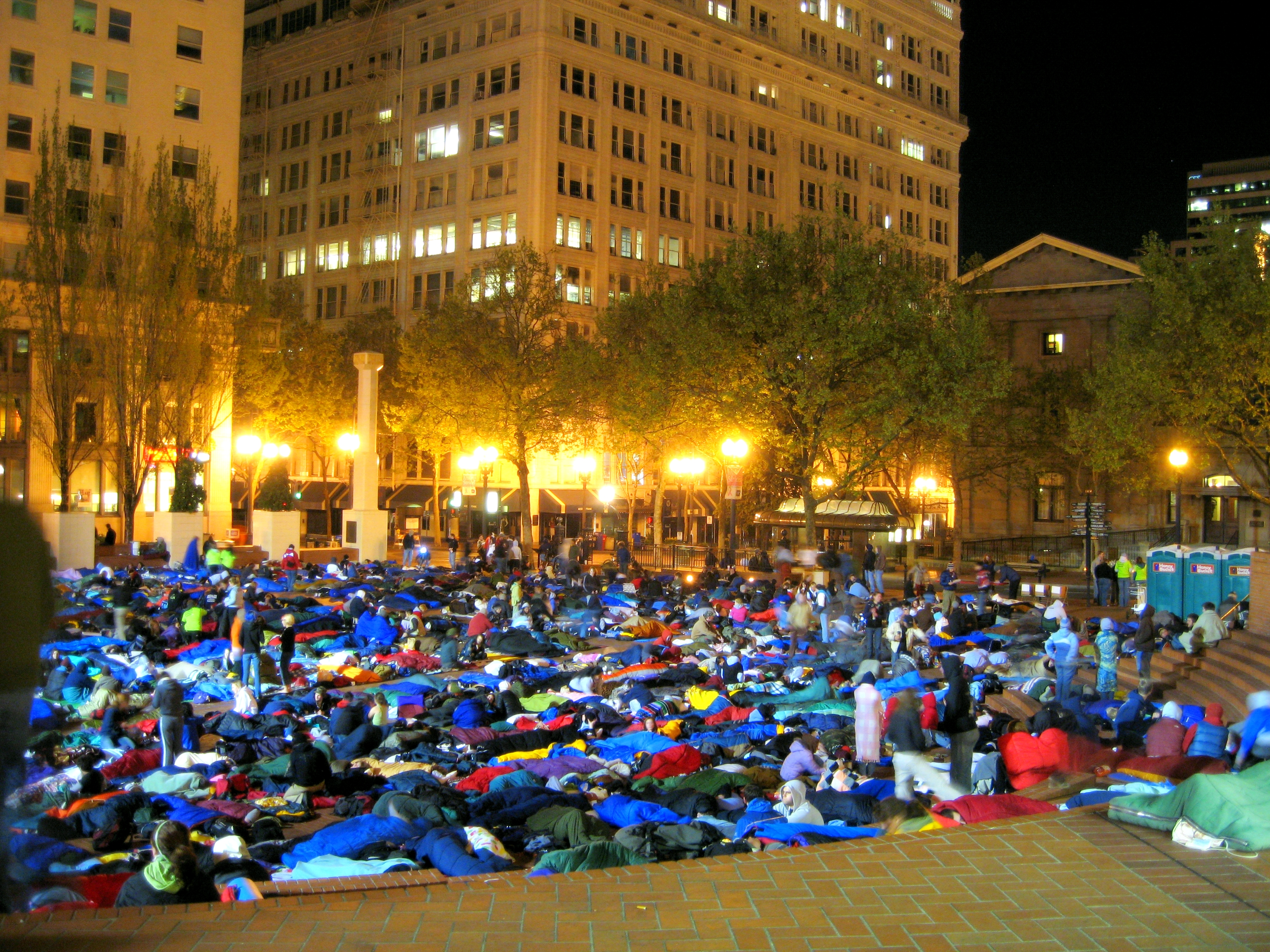
Global Night Commute in Portland, Oregon

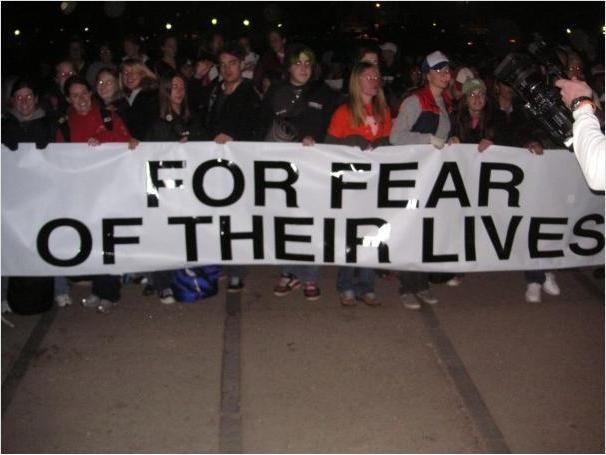
Boston, Massachusetts, displays its Global Message

Global Night Commute was a worldwide event organized by the makers of the film Invisible Children through the organization Invisible Children, Inc. It took place on April 29, 2006. Youths from around the world walked to city centers and spent the night in parks to show support for Ugandan children who walk every night into city centers attempting to avoid capture by the Lord's Resistance Army (LRA).

== Overview ==
These children, between the ages of 3 and 17, from Acholiland in Northern Uganda, are referred to as "night commuters". They walk up to 20 km (12 mi) from internally displaced person camps to larger towns, notably Gulu, in search of safety from the LRA.

The Global Night Commute was similar to other initiatives raising awareness about the plight of the children in Acholiland like the Gulu Walk that took place in over 40 cities internationally in October 2005; however, the Global Night Commute took place on a much larger scale. Over 58,000 people signed up to participate in the event, but over 80,000 attended in total; it took place in 130 cities in seven countries.

The goal of the event was to raise awareness and ultimately end Africa's longest running conflict by facilitating a change in the policies of the United States government. The slogan for the event is "On April 29th, we gathered. To make a difference. To end a war."
