= Owiny Ki-Bul =

- Village
- Location in South Sudan
- Coordinates: 3°50′24″N 32°15′41″E
- Country: South Sudan
- Region: Equatoria
- State: Eastern Equatoria
- County: Magwi County
- Payam: Owiny Ki-Bul Payam
- Time zone: UTC+2 (CAT)

Owiny Ki-Bul (Acholi: "sound of the drums") is a village in the state of East Equatoria in South Sudan. It is located about 200 km south of the regional capital, Juba. The village consists of several dozen thatched-roof huts.

Owiny Ki-Bul is, along with Ri-Kwangba, one of two assembly points for the rebels of the Lord's Resistance Army (LRA) under the Cessation of Hostilities Agreement agreed to by the LRA and the government of Uganda on 26 August 2006.

Owiny Ki-Bul houses a SSPDF training center. In June 2011, David Yau Yau signed a peace deal with the South Sudanese government and his troop were airlifted by UNMISS to Owiny Ki-Bul to await integration to the SSPDF.

In February 2015, clashes between villagers and SSPDF trainees erupted in Owiny Ki-Bul after a barfight involving a soldier. SSPDF soldiers burned 136 houses and clashes lead to over 30 people getting injured.
