= Éliane Duthoit =

Éliane Duthoit (born 25 June 1946 in Brittany), a French citizen, is a senior United Nations official at the Office for the Coordination of Humanitarian Affairs (OCHA).

== Career overview ==
Since the early 1990s, Duthoit was appointed successively Deputy Humanitarian Coordinator in Ingushetia (covering Chechnya), and then head of the OCHA offices in Uganda, Timor-Leste, Nepal, Southern Sudan, and latterly Chad. Between these appointments, she carried out short assignments with other functions in Burundi and elsewhere.

== Specific achievements ==
In Uganda, Éliane Duthoit played an important role in attracting international attention to what the United Nations believed was a forgotten humanitarian crisis.

In Chechnya, she played an important role in facilitating negotiations between the Russian military and Chechen rebels to ensure humanitarian relief for internally displaced persons (IDPs).

In 2006, she was appointed by United Nations Secretary-General Kofi Annan as head of the OCHA office in Juba, Southern Sudan, under the leadership of Under-Secretary-General Jan Egeland. This was when humanitarian needs were gradually leading the way to development, in which OCHA along with other United Nations agencies reportedly played an important role. In Southern Sudan, she also played a significant role, in facilitating negotiations at the 2006-2007 Juba talks between the Government of Uganda and the Lord's Resistance Army (LRA), hosted and mediated by the Government of Southern Sudan with United Nations support in the person of Joaquim Chissano as Special Envoy of the Secretary-General for LRA-affected areas.

In August 2007, with increasing humanitarian needs in Chad, she was appointed by United Nations Secretary-General Ban Ki-moon as head of the OCHA office in Chad, based in the capital N'Djamena. In February 2008 when armed fighting erupted in N'Djamena, she stayed behind as part of a United Nations skeleton team

Preceded by unknown	Head of the OCHA Office, Uganda; 2002–2005	Succeeded by Tim Pitt
Preceded by unknown	Head of the OCHA Office, Nepal; 2005–2006	Succeeded by unknown
Preceded by Rudolph Muller	Head of the OCHA Office, Southern Sudan; 2006–2007	Succeeded by Vincent Lelei
Preceded by Ines Brill	Head of the OCHA Office, Chad; 2007–present	Incumbent
