= Matthew Green (journalist) =

British journalist and author (born 1975)

Matthew Green (born 17 October 1975) is a British journalist and author. He is currently the South Asia security correspondent for the Financial Times.

== Biography ==
Green was raised in Hampton, London, where he attended Hampton School before studying African politics at Oxford University, and spent five years on the ground in East Africa reporting for Reuters.

Green's first book, entitled The Wizard of the Nile: The Hunt for Africa’s Most Wanted, documents his search through the conflict zone of Uganda for Joseph Kony, the mysterious rebel leader known for abducting children and using them as child soldiers.

From 2007 to 2009, he was based in Lagos as the West Africa correspondent for the Financial Times. In September 2009, he took up a new assignment as the paper's South Asia security correspondent, covering Afghanistan and Pakistan from Kabul and Islamabad. He also reported from the front line in the Iraq War whilst embedded with US marines.

== Articles ==
- Matthew Green in the Financial Times:
- On influencing oil markets:
