= Lord's Resistance Army Disarmament and Northern Uganda Recovery Act =

The Lord's Resistance Army Disarmament and Northern Uganda Recovery Act (Pub. L. 111–172 (text) (PDF)) was a 2010 US act of Congress promoted by the Obama administration that makes it American policy to kill or capture Joseph Kony and to crush his Lord's Resistance Army rebellion. According to President Obama "the legislation crystallizes the commitment of the United States to help bring an end to the brutality and destruction that have been a hallmark of the LRA across several countries for two decades, and to pursue a future of greater security and hope for the people of central Africa".

In October 2011 Obama announced that he would send 100 American military advisors to Uganda, South Sudan, the Central African Republic and the Democratic Republic of the Congo to help the regional forces remove Joseph Kony "from the battlefield". However, they were not authorized to fight unless they were fired upon.

== Response ==
Human rights advocates have reported that both the Ugandan army and the former Sudan People's Liberation Army, which forms the core of the new South Sudanese army, have exploited children as soldiers. Some of them criticized the U.S. decision to provide military assistance for armies accused of using child soldiers: "Countries that keep using child soldiers aren't going to get serious about ending the practice until they see the US is serious about withholding the money," said Jo Becker, child rights advocate at Human Rights Watch. In addition, government forces of Uganda and its neighbour countries have themselves been accused of human rights violations such as attacks against civilians, use of child soldiers and looting of civilian homes and businesses.

On the other hand, Human Rights Watch executive director Kenneth Roth welcomed U.S. efforts to bring "war criminals in Africa" to justice, adding: "In fact, we [HRW] often find ourselves urging governments to use their coercive power more assertively to protect civilians. We want to see Joseph Kony and others responsible for atrocities – whether they are abusive leaders in countries like Sudan, or terrorists who kill civilians, brought to justice."

There has also been a more realist analysis of President Obama's decision to send military advisers to the region, with some suggesting that the assistance was a reward for Ugandan assistance in Somalia.
