= Joseph Kony =

Founder of the Lord's Resistance Army (born 1961)

Head of the Lord's Resistance Army
- Incumbent
- Assumed office August 1987
- Preceded by: Office established

Personal details
- Born: September 1961 (age 65) Odek, Northern Region, Protectorate of Uganda
- Children: 42 (as of 2006), including Ali and Salim

Military service
- Allegiance: Lord's Resistance Army
- Years of service: 1987–present
- Battles/wars: Lord's Resistance Army insurgency
- Criminal information
- Status: Fugitive; charges confirmed in absentia on 6 November 2025
- Criminal charges: 39 counts of war crimes and crimes against humanity, including murder of civilians, pillaging, enslavement (including sexual), rape, torture, forced pregnancy, and conscription of children
- Wanted by: International Criminal Court
- Wanted since: 8 July 2005 (warrant unsealed 13 October 2005)

Joseph Rao Kony (born September 1961) is an Acholi Ugandan militant and warlord who founded the Lord's Resistance Army (LRA), designated as a terrorist group by the United Nations Peacekeepers, the European Union, and various other governments including the United Kingdom and United States.

Kony served as an altar boy in his childhood. After the Ugandan Civil War, Kony participated in the subsequent insurgency against president Yoweri Museveni under the Holy Spirit Movement or the Uganda People's Democratic Army before founding the LRA in 1987. Aiming to create a Christian state based on dominion theology, Kony directed the multi-decade Lord's Resistance Army insurgency. After Kony's terror activities, he was banished from Uganda and shifted to South Sudan largely between 2005 and 2006 due to intense military pressure from the Ugandan army and a peace deal between Sudan and southern rebels.

Kony has long been one of Africa's most notorious and most wanted militant warlords. He has been accused by government entities of ordering the abduction of children to become child soldiers and sex slaves. Approximately 66,000 children became soldiers, and 2 million people were displaced internally from 1986 to 2009 by his forces. Kony was indicted in 2005 for war crimes and crimes against humanity by the International Criminal Court (ICC) in The Hague, but he has evaded capture. He has been subject to an Interpol Red Notice at the ICC's request since 2006. Since the Juba peace talks in 2006, the Lord's Resistance Army no longer operates in Uganda. Sources claim that they are in the Democratic Republic of the Congo (DRC), the Central African Republic (CAR), or South Sudan. In 2013, Kony was reported to be in poor health, and Michel Djotodia, president of the CAR, claimed he was negotiating with Kony to surrender.

By April 2017, Kony was still at large, but his force was reported to have shrunk to approximately 100 soldiers, down from an estimated high of 3,000. Both the United States and Uganda ended the hunt for Kony and the LRA, believing that the LRA was no longer a significant security risk to Uganda. As of 2022, he was reported to be hiding in Darfur.

== Early life and family ==
Kony was born in September 1961 in Odek, a village in Omoro District near Gulu. He is a member of the Acholi people. His father, Luizi Obol, was a farmer and lay catechist of the Catholic Church. Kony's mother, Nora Oting, was an Anglican and also a farmer. He was either the youngest or second-youngest of six children in the family. His older sister, Gabriela Lakot, still lives in Odek. He enjoyed a good relationship with his siblings, but was quick to retaliate in a dispute, and when confronted, would often resort to physical violence. Kony never finished elementary school, dropping out at age 15. He was an altar boy until 1976. He married Selly and together they had a son, Ali Ssalongo Kony.

== Rebel leader ==
The overthrow of Acholi President Tito Okello by Yoweri Museveni and his National Resistance Army (NRA) during the Ugandan Bush War (1981–1986) had culminated in the mass looting of livestock, rape, burning of homes, genocide, and murder by Museveni's army. The acts committed by the Museveni's NRA, now known as the Uganda People's Defence Force, led to Kony's creation of the LRA. The insurgencies gave rise to concentration camps in northern Uganda where over 2 million people were confined. The government burned people's properties using helicopter gunships, killing many. There were forced displacements in the northern region. International campaigns called for all camps to be dismantled and for the people to return to their former villages.

In 1987, Kony joined the anti-government Ugandan People's Democratic Army. The same year, Kony claimed that he was possessed for the first time by a spirit named "Juma Oris", which was the same name as that of the still living UPDA founder. The spirit Juma Oris would remain Kony's spiritual guide for numerous years. While with the UPDA, he founded the precursor to the Lord's Resistance Army. In early 1988, he founded a wing of the United Democratic Christian Army. Both groups were later defeated by Kony's LRA and absorbed into their ranks.

In March 1988, roughly six months after joining the UPDA, Kony rose to prominence as the new leader of the Holy Spirit Movement, previously led by Alice Auma, also known as Alice Lakwena and often described as a cousin to Kony, who had fled to Kenya earlier in the year. In August 1988, he kidnapped Auma's father, Severino Lukoya, who had similarly proclaimed himself to be a medium, and held him prisoner for six months to dissuade him from attempting to take over the movement from Kony.

In 2006, in the Juba peace talks with the LRA rebels, Museveni's government gave permission for local people to return to their villages. This marked the beginning of the rehabilitation of homes, roads, and other infrastructure.

=== Lord's Resistance Army ===
Kony has been implicated in abduction and recruitment of child soldiers. The LRA has had battle confrontations with the government's NRA or UPDF within Uganda and in South Sudan for ten years. In 2008 the Ugandan army invaded the DRC in search for the LRA in Operation Lightning Thunder. In November 2013, Kony was reported to be in poor health in the eastern CAR town of Nzoka.

Looking back at the LRA's campaign of violence, The Guardian stated in 2015 that Kony's forces had been responsible for the deaths of over 100,000 and the abduction of at least 60,000 children. Atrocities committed include raping young girls and abducting them for use as sex slaves.

The actual number of LRA militia members has varied significantly over the years, reaching as high as 3,000 soldiers. By 2017, the organization's membership had shrunk significantly to an estimated 100 soldiers. In April 2017, both the US and Ugandan governments ended efforts to find Kony and fight the LRA, stating that the LRA no longer posed a significant security risk to Uganda.

While initially purporting to fight against government oppression, the LRA allegedly turned against Kony's own supporters, supposedly to "purify" the Acholi people and turn Uganda into a theocracy. Kony proclaims himself the spokesperson of God and a spirit medium and claims to receive advice and communications from God by a multinational host of 13 spirits, including a Chinese phantom. Ideologically, the group is a syncretic mix of mysticism, Acholi nationalism, and heterodox Christian fundamentalism, and claims to be establishing a theocratic state based on the Ten Commandments and local Acholi tradition.

=== Indictment ===
In October 2006, the ICC announced that arrest warrants had been issued for five members of the Lord's Resistance Army for crimes against humanity following a sealed indictment. The next day, Ugandan defence minister Amama Mbabazi revealed that the warrants include Kony, his deputy Vincent Otti, and LRA commanders Raska Lukwiya, Okot Odhiambo, and Dominic Ongwen. The Ugandan army killed Lukwiya in August 2006.

The BBC received information that Otti had been killed in October 2007, at Kony's home. In November 2006, Kony met Jan Egeland, the UN Under-Secretary-General for Humanitarian Affairs and Emergency Relief Coordinator. Journeyman Pictures released a 2006 interview with Kony in which he proclaims: "I am a freedom fighter, not a terrorist." He told Reuters: "We don't have any children. We only have combatants."

In November 2022, prosecutors at the ICC applied for an in absentia hearing to confirm the charges against Kony. In 2024, the hearing was scheduled for 15 October. Kony will be represented by a court-appointed lawyer if he has not been captured when the hearing, the first of its kind to take place at the ICC..

In April 2025, the Office of the Prosecutor at the ICC submitted an updated document with the charges. It states that Joseph Kony is suspected of 39 counts of war crimes and crimes against humanity, which he is believed to have committed between July 2002, and December 2005, in northern Uganda. The ICC began hearing Kony's charges in September 2025.

== Religious beliefs ==
Kony's followers, as well as some detractors, believe he is possessed by spirits. Per Kony, temporary daily possessions began in 1987 and ended in 1999 after his return from Jebel Lem, Sudan. 12 or 13 individual spirits, who were often referred to by several different names, were identified by physical description and strategic role. They were most often meant to aid soldiers in battle through protective spells or by manipulating enemy troops. Others served functions within the LRA's inner structure, such as dictating moral codes and rules, and enforcing punishments to discourage dissent.

The spirits were given titles, some conventional, such as a chief operational commander or intelligence officers, but also "Chairman of the Spirits", "Controller of Heavy Weapons", and two "Keepers of Time and Miracles". Kony ascribed various nationalities to the spirits, mostly Ugandan, American, and Italian, as well as Sudanese, Tanzanian, and Chinese. One spirit, "Ugandan Martyr" Carl Lwanga, was one of the historical Uganda Martyrs executed by Kabaka of Buganda Mwanga II.

Kony tells his child soldiers that a cross on their chest drawn in oil will protect them from bullets. He is a proponent of polygamy, and is thought to have had 60 wives, and to have fathered 42 children. Kony insists that he and the LRA are fighting for the Ten Commandments, and defended his actions in an interview, saying, "Is it bad? It is not against human rights. And that commandment was not given by Joseph. It was not given by LRA. No, those commandments were given by God."

Ugandan political leader Betty Bigombe recalled that Kony and his followers used oil to ward off bullets and evil spirits. Kony claims to be a spirit medium. In 2008, responding to a request by Ugandan President Yoweri Museveni to engage in peace talks via telephone, he said, "I will communicate with Museveni through the holy spirits and not through the telephone."

During peace talks in 1994, Kony was preceded by men in robes sprinkling holy water. According to Francis Ongom, a former LRA officer who defected, Kony "has found Bible justifications for killing witches, for killing those who farm or eat pigs because of the story of the Gadarene swine, and for killing other people because God did the same with Noah's flood and Sodom and Gomorrah."

== Action against Kony ==
=== Uganda ===
In 1989, before the insurgency, he escaped to Uganda. He was later captured by the Ugandan government. In 1992, he was released after the government no longer viewed him as a threat.

The Ugandan military has attempted to kill Kony throughout the insurgency. In Uganda's attempt to track down Kony, former LRA combatants have been enlisted to search remote areas of the CAR, Sudan, and the DRC where he was last seen.

=== United States ===
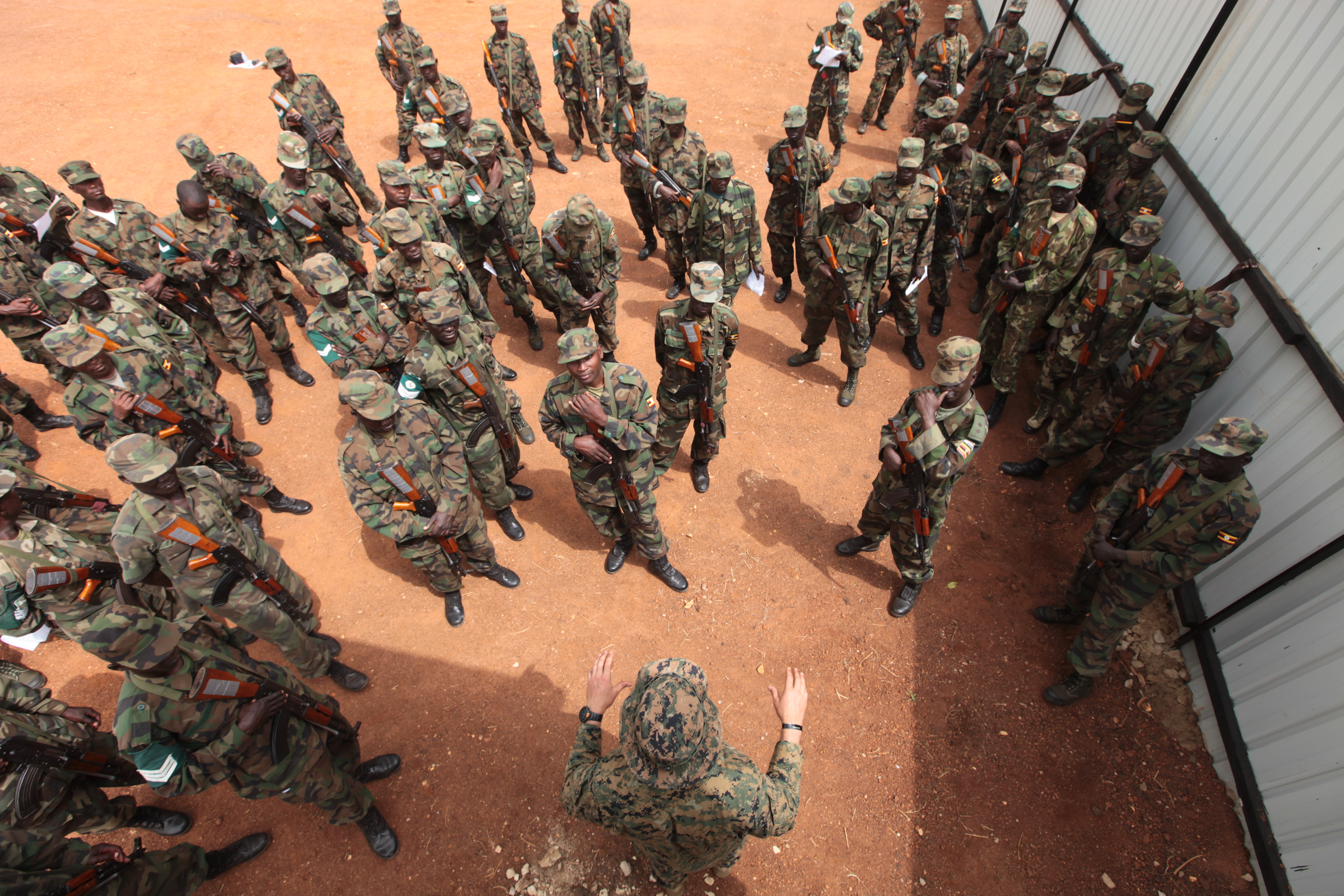
A force reconnaissance US Marine goes over threat detection methods with a group of Ugandan soldiers, February 2012. Special Purpose Marine Air Ground Task Force 12 sent a small team of Marines into Uganda on 3 February to train Ugandan forces for the fight against al-Shabaab in Somalia and the hunt for Joseph Kony and the Lord’s resistance army.

After the September 11 attacks, the United States designated the LRA a terrorist group. In August 2008, the US Department of State declared Kony a Specially Designated Global Terrorist pursuant to Executive Order 13224, a designation that carries financial and other penalties. In November 2008, U.S. President George W. Bush signed the directive to the United States Africa Command to provide financial and logistical assistance to the Ugandan government during the unsuccessful 2008–2009 Garamba offensive, code-named Operation Lightning Thunder.

No U.S. troops were directly involved. 17 U.S. advisers and analysts provided intelligence, equipment, and fuel to Ugandan military counterparts. The offensive pushed Kony from his jungle camp, but he was not captured. One hundred children were rescued.

In May 2010, U.S. President Barack Obama signed into law the Lord's Resistance Army Disarmament and Northern Uganda Recovery Act, legislation aimed at stopping Kony and the LRA. The bill passed unanimously in the United States Senate on 11 March. On 12 May 2010, a motion to suspend the rules and pass the bill was agreed to by voice vote (two-thirds being in the affirmative) in the House of Representatives. In November 2010, Obama delivered a strategy document to Congress asking for more funding to disarm Kony and the LRA.

In October 2011, Obama authorized the deployment of approximately 100 combat-equipped U.S. troops to central Africa. Their goal is to help regional forces remove Kony and senior LRA leaders from the battlefield. In a letter to Congress, Obama wrote: "Although the U.S. forces are combat-equipped, they will only be providing information, advice, and assistance to partner nation forces, and they will not themselves engage LRA forces unless necessary for self-defense".

In April 2013, the Obama administration offered rewards of up to US$5 million for information leading to the arrest, transfer, or conviction of Kony, Ongwen, and Odhiambo. In March 2014, the U.S. announced it would deploy at least four CV-22 Ospreys and refuelling planes, and 150 Air Force special forces personnel to assist in the capture of Kony.

=== African Union ===
In March 2012, the African Union announced its intentions to "send 5,000 soldiers to join the hunt for rebel leader Joseph Kony" and to "neutralize" him while isolating the scattered LRA groups responsible for 2,600 civilian killings since 2008. This international task force was said to include soldiers "from Uganda, South Sudan, Central African Republic and Congo, countries where Kony's reign of terror has been felt over the years." Before this announcement, the hunt for Kony had primarily been carried out by troops from Uganda. The soldiers began their search in South Sudan on 24 March 2012, and the search "will last until Kony is caught".

=== Kony 2012 ===
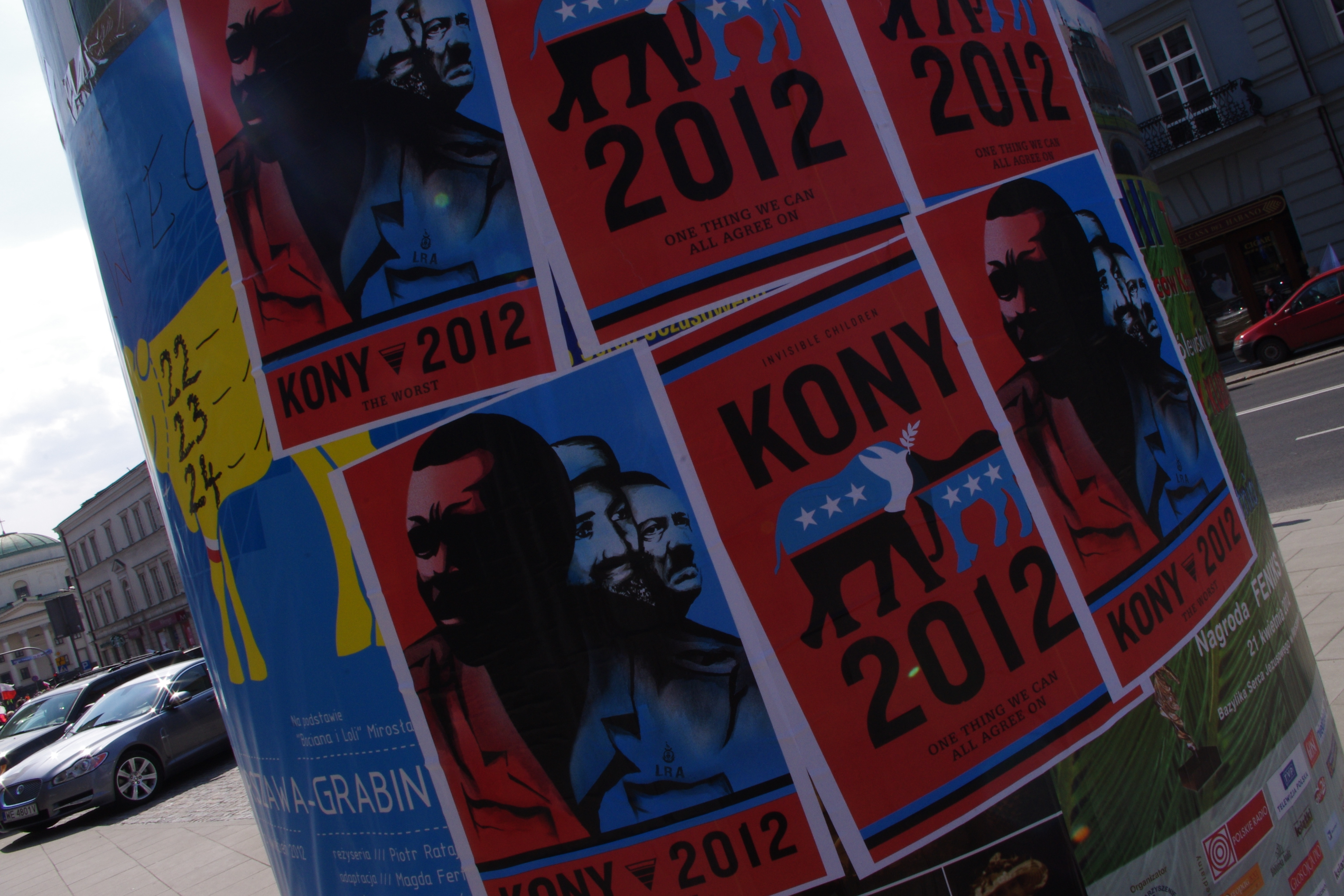
Posters for Kony 2012 in Three Crosses Square, Warsaw

Kony and the LRA received a surge of attention in early March 2012, when a 30-minute documentary, Kony 2012, by US filmmaker Jason Russell for the campaign group Invisible Children, Inc. was released. The intention of the production was to draw attention to Kony in an effort to increase US involvement in the issue and have Kony arrested by the end of 2012.

A poll suggested that more than half of young adult Americans heard about Kony 2012 in the days following its release. Several weeks after its release, a resolution condemning Kony and supporting US assistance fighting the LRA was introduced in the US Senate, passing several months later. Kony 2012 has been criticized for simplifying the history of the LRA conflict, and for failing to note that Kony was already pushed out of Uganda six years before the film was made.

=== Surrender of Ongwen ===
Dominic Ongwen served as a key member of the LRA and constituted one of Kony's senior aides in the organization. Kidnapped as a child, he became a soldier in the LRA, then rose through the organization's hierarchy. Ongwen surrendered himself to representatives of the CAR in January 2015, which was a major blow to Kony's group. Ugandan army spokesman Paddy Ankunda stated that the event "puts the LRA in the most vulnerable position" and that it "is only Kony left standing".

Of the five LRA commanders charged by the ICC in 2004, only Kony remained at large at that time. With only a few hundred fighters remaining loyal to him, it was mistakenly thought that he would be unable to evade capture much longer. In February 2021, Ongwen was convicted by the International Criminal Court of 61 counts of crimes against humanity and war crimes.

=== LRA neutralization and U.S. stand-down ===
In April 2017, Ugandan and US military forces ended their hunt for Kony and his group, with a Ugandan spokesperson saying, "the LRA no longer poses a threat to us as Uganda". At that time, his force was estimated to have shrunk to around 100 soldiers.

=== Current whereabouts ===
In April 2022, DW News reported that a number of LRA members said Kony was hiding in the Darfur region of Sudan. From there, he was allegedly giving orders to his fighters. One former member said that the fighters were "tired and unmotivated", and leaving in favour of living a normal life. Kony was previously provided with armed and logistical support from former Sudanese president Omar al-Bashir.

In April 2024, Kony was reportedly settled in a camp 10 miles from a village named Yemen in the Central African Republic. In the same month, hearing the news of the surrender of 14 LRA members to the government forces, the Wagner Group attacked Kony's camp, prompting him and his 71 men to flee towards Sudan.

== See also ==
- International Criminal Court investigations
- Lord's Resistance Army insurgency
- List of fugitives from justice who disappeared
- Child soldiers in the Democratic Republic of the Congo

== Bibliography ==
- Briggs, Jimmie (2005). The Innocents Lost: When Child Soldiers Go to War. Basic Books. ISBN 0-465-00798-8.
- Bussman, Jane (2009). The Worst Date Ever: War Crimes, Hollywood Heart-Throbs and Other Abominations. Macmillan. ISBN 978-0-230-73712-9.
- Cline, Lawrence E. (2013). The Lord's Resistance Army. ABC-CLIO. ISBN 978-1-440-82855-3.
- Green, Matthew (2008). The Wizard of the Nile: The Hunt for Africa's Most Wanted. Portobello Books. ISBN 978-1-84627-031-4.
