= Kafia Kingi =

Disputed area in Central Africa

Kafia Kingi كافيا كنجي
- Location in South Sudan Kafia Kingi (Sudan)
- Coordinates: 9.273123°N 24.417404°E
- Country (de jure): South Sudan
- Country (de facto): Sudan

Area
  - Total: 4,800 sq mi (12,500 km^{2})

Population
  - Estimate (2010): 16,000
- Time zone: UTC+2

Kafia Kingi (Arabic: كافيا كنجي) is a mineral-rich region in South Sudan, on the border with Sudan and the Central African Republic.

The area was due to be given to South Sudan under the terms of the 2005 Comprehensive Peace Agreement which required use of the Sudan "north–south line" as of 1 January 1956. It was not until 1960 that the Kafia Kingi area was transferred north of that line and added to Darfur. Sudan controls all or most of this area today, though at times independent South Sudan forces have briefly controlled large portions.

Almost all of Kafia Kingi (except a southern portion south of the Umblasha River) is within the borders of the Sudanese Radom National Park, a biosphere reserve, of which two-thirds are also within the borders of Kafia Kingi, while another one-third of the National Park is within the Sudanese region of South Darfur.

The Kafia Kingi region is a known haven for ivory smugglers. Congolese ivory is frequently held in Kafia Kingi before being taken north into Darfur.

1951 Sudan Survey Dept. and US Army Map Service map showing in detail the north–south line's location until 1960 on the northwest border of Kafia Kingi

1951 Sudan Survey Dept. and US Army Map Service map showing in detail the north–south line's location until 1960 on the north and northeast border of Kafia Kingi
