= Invisible Children =

- Theatrical release poster
- Directed by: Jason Russell; Bobby Bailey; Laren Poole
- Distributed by: Invisible Children, Inc.
- Release date: 2006
- Running time: 55 minutes
- Country: United States
- Language: English

Invisible Children is a 2006 American documentary film which depicts the human rights abuses by the Lord's Resistance Army in Uganda.

== Synopsis ==
In the spring of 2003, Jason Russell, Bobby Bailey, and Laren Poole traveled to Africa to document the War in Darfur. Instead, they changed their focus to covering the conflict in northern Uganda, Africa's second longest-running conflict after the Eritrean War of Independence. The documentary depicts the abduction of children who are used as child soldiers by Joseph Kony and his Lord's Resistance Army (LRA). The film centers around a group of Ugandan children who walk miles every night to places of refuge in order to avoid abduction by the LRA.

== Exhibition ==
The film was first screened on June 22, 2004 at the Joan B. Kroc Institute for Peace and Justice at the University of San Diego. Since then, Invisible Children, Inc. has hosted more than 10,000 screenings at colleges, high schools, churches, concerts, and other venues. As of June 2009, it is estimated that more than 5 million people have seen Invisible Children: The Rough Cut.

== Social activism ==
The story of children depicted in the film was the basis for a grassroots movement mobilizing thousands of American teens into action to raise money to both rebuild war-torn schools in northern Uganda and provide scholarships to African youth. In 2005, a 501(c)(3) non-profit, Invisible Children, Inc., was created giving individuals a way to respond to the situation in Uganda. An employee of the organization, Nate Henn, was killed in the July 2010 Kampala attacks.

== DVD ==
The film is about 55 minutes long and the DVD includes a shorter 35-minute version for different screening options. The DVD includes special features; deleted scenes, extras, filmmaker commentary, update on the war, and trailers filmed by Invisible Children, Inc.
