= Lord's Resistance Army insurgency (1994–2002) =

Insurgency in northern Uganda

The start of the period 1994 to 2002 of the Lord's Resistance Army insurgency in northern Uganda saw the conflict intensifying due to Sudanese support to the rebels. There was a peak of bloodshed in the mid-1990s and then a gradual subsiding of the conflict. Violence was renewed beginning with the offensive by the Uganda People's Defence Force in 2002.

For a seven-year period beginning in 1987, the Lord's Resistance Army was a minor rebel group along the periphery of Uganda. However, two weeks after Museveni delivered his ultimatum of 6 February 1994, LRA fighters were reported to have crossed the northern border and established bases in southern Sudan with the approval of the Khartoum government.

The end of the Bigombe peace initiatives marks a fundamental shift in the character of the Lord's Resistance Army, which is estimated to have consisted of 3,000 to 4,000 combatants at this time. This is the turning point at which the LRA becomes essentially the organization that operates today.

== Sudanese support expands the scale of the conflict ==
Sudanese aid was a response to Ugandan support for the rebel Sudan People's Liberation Army (SPLA) fighting in the civil war in the south of the country. Prior to this support, the LRA could be treated as a minor irritant in the outskirts of the country; now it also had to be considered a proxy force of the Khartoum government. Sudanese support allowed the LRA to increase the intensity of its operations beyond the level at which it was previously capable.

Not only was a safe haven granted from which the LRA could launch attacks into Uganda, but Sudan also gave a large amount of arms, ammunition, land mines and other supplies. In return, the LRA was expected to deny territory to the SPLA and periodically participate in joint operations with the Sudanese army. The increased intensity of attacks through proxy forces led Uganda and Sudan to the brink of open hostilities in 1995.

== Acholi civilians as targets ==
Drawing by a Ugandan child from memory. Translated caption states, "Rebels are heading towards Sudan led by Otii Lagony and Lagira. Many people were captured and when one failed to walk was killed."

There was also a marked change in how the LRA perceived the conflict. Having become convinced that the Acholi were now collaborating with the Museveni government, Kony began to target the civilians using his increased military strength. Mutilations such as those carried out in the wake of the Arrow Group strategy became commonplace, and 1994 saw the first mass forced abduction of children and young people. Other militant groups, such as the West Nile Bank Front, adopted the LRA tactics of abductions and raids. The strategy of forced recruitment was prompted by the lack of new volunteers to continue the conflict, and the fact that the young could be indoctrinated to support the LRA much more easily than adults.

Furthermore, the LRA no longer had to spend much of its energies in the search for basic supplies now that they were supported by Sudan. The moral rationale was that since the Acholi adults had proven themselves untrustworthy, the LRA must cleanse the land of them and create a new society with the children. This philosophical approach, similar to that taken by the Khmer Rouge of Cambodia, has been referred to as "auto-genocide."

The attacks on civilians have at least three strategic objectives. First, to deny the government information about its movements by forcing the rural population to flee. Second, to gather resources from the looted villages. Third and most bizarrely, to show the populace that the government is unable or unwilling to provide protection, and thus encourage people to support to the LRA. While the lack of security has certainly embittered many Acholi, this has not translated into support for the LRA forces that are attacking them.

There were numerous incidents that occurred after Sudanese support and are exceptional because of the large number of victims, the identity of the victims, or the circumstances of the incident. On April 22, 1995, Atiak Trading Center in northern Gulu District was attacked and the Local Defense Forces routed. Over the course of the day between 170 and 220 civilians were killed in the absence of resistance from government forces.

On March 8, 1996, a civilian convoy of over 20 vehicles with a military escort of 14 soldiers travelling west on the Karuma-Pakwach road was ambushed. Between 50 and 110 civilians were killed, most after the escort had been overcome. Some were executed; others were killed after they refused to exit their buses and explosives were thrown inside.

The LRA carried out three separate attacks on July 13 to July 14, 1996 upon a settlement of Sudanese refugees in southern Kitgum (now Pader District) administered by the Office of the UN High Commissioner for Refugees. Approximately 100 refugees were killed. In the Lokung/Palabek massacre from January 7 to January 12, 1997, up to 412 civilians were killed in and around the subcounties of Lokung and Palabek in northwest Kitgum. There were no opposing forces and most victims were bludgeoned or hacked to death.

The most famous attack of this period were the St. Mary's College/Aboke abductions on October 10, 1996. At about 2 a.m. about 200 armed rebels broke into St. Mary's College in Aboke, northern Apac District, and abducted 139 secondary school girls between 13 and 16 years of age before leaving at about 5 a.m. At 7 a.m., the deputy head mistress of the college, Sister Rachele Fassera, pursued the rebels and negotiated the release of 109 of the girls. Five of the thirty remaining girls died in captivity; all but two eventually made their escape, as of 2006.

Government forces have also been the focus of controversy. On August 31, 1995, thirteen civilians, some with their hands tied behind their backs, were killed in a government gunship attack on an LRA column near Lokung, northwest Kitgum. Sixteen LRA combatants were also killed. Critics charged reckless disregard for abductee lives; the government claimed the killings were accidental and unintentional.

The military contributed to mob killings in Gulu Town on August 16, 1996. Four LRA suspects were turned over to an Acholi mob that beat them to death. The suspects were under government custody and are reported to have been turned over to the mob in the presence of senior Uganda Fourth Division officers.

The deaths of two Acholi elders on 8 June 1996 remains a mystery. Mr. Okot Ogony of Cwero, eastern Gulu, Chairman of the Peace Commission of the Council of Acholi Chiefs, and Mr. Olanya Lacony, a respected elder from Kac-Goma, southwestern Gulu, were found murdered near Cwero in still unexplained circumstances. They were the leaders of a local initiative to restart the peace talks that had collapsed in February 1994 and had the approval of the President of Uganda and an invitation from the LRA. Some blame the LRA, while others point to corrupt National Resistance Army officers.

Internally Displaced People's Camps," IDP. The government forced people of Northern Uganda in camps without protection. It is also believed that the government army killed civilians in these displaced camps. The creation of government "protected villages" beginning in 1996 further deepened the antagonistic attitude that many Acholi have toward the government. While many Acholi were already displaced by the conflict, they resented being ordered into camps. A strategy of resettlement, or "villagization", is a common anti-insurgent technique, used extensively for example by the United States throughout the Indian Wars to isolate Native Americans in reservations. It is intended to free up troops that would otherwise be attempting to defend innumerable small communities and to deny the rebels access to resources. Nevertheless, the population continues to be attacked by the LRA even within the "protected camps." The camps are also crowded, unsanitary, and miserable places to live.

== A culture of peace and a gradual subsiding ==
The bloodshed in 1995 to 1996 appears to have convinced the population that a negotiated solution was the only acceptable option. This is what one writer calls the emergence of "a culture of peace." As most of the LRA combatants are abducted children, a military solution is widely seen by the Acholi as a massacre of victims. Government attempts to destroy the rebels are thus viewed as another cause for grievance by the Acholi. The moral ambiguity of this situation, in which abducted young rebels are both the victims and perpetrators of brutal acts, is vital in understanding the current conflict.

In response the continued insurgencies by the LRA, as well as other pro-Sudanese rebel factions, the Ugandan government aided "Operation Thunderbolt" in early 1997, a large-scale offensive by the Sudan People's Liberation Army (SPLA). The SPLA had long fought against the Sudanese government, and was also hostile toward the pro-Sudanese Ugandan rebels. The Ugandan government hoped that it could weaken its enemies by supporting Operation Thunderbolt with tanks, artillery, other ground forces, and supplies. The Ugandan military, along with the SPLA and other allies, consequently attacked LRA bases during this offensive. Though Operation Thunderbolt did not make a tangible impact on the LRA itself, it greatly weakened other Ugandan insurgent factions as well as the Sudanese government. The Sudanese government of the National Islamic Front consequently began to back away from its previous hard-line stance. This also was prompted by the leadership of new President Omar al-Bashir, who wanted to ensure export of the oil from the newly developed fields being wrested from SPLA control. The U.S. had also taken a more proactive stance against the National Islamic Front government. U.S. pressure on Sudan intensified following the 1998 bombing of the American embassies in Kenya and Tanzania by al-Qaeda operatives with links to Sudan. Over the next several years, Khartoum is believed to have substantially curtailed aid to the LRA. In 1999 the Carter Center mediated the Nairobi Agreement between Uganda and Sudan, which restored diplomatic relations in 2001.

In 2000, the Parliament of Uganda passed the Amnesty Act. This act pardons rebels who give themselves up to the Amnesty Commission and renounce violence. While it did not end the insurgency, it proved effective enough in some of the other regions of the country that had experienced rebellion to be maintained.

The sudden appearance of LRA units in June 2001 who contacted local government officials to discuss the possibility of dialogue created a flurry of speculation that the LRA was tiring of their insurgency. The Uganda People's Defense Force – the renamed NRA – created a demilitarized zone for the talks, a measure that had the implicit approval of President Museveni. The talks were exploratory in nature and the LRA units eventually returned to Sudan. However, analysts believed that they were initiated at the behest of Kony and indicated the most promising diplomatic environment since the collapse of the Bigombe talks in 1994.

In 1999 Joseph Kony had one of his leading commanders Alex Otti-Lagony executed accusing him of betrayal. The killing appears to have weakened the LRA by depriving it of one of its more effective commanders and spreading paranoia in its ranks.

Following the al-Qaeda attacks in 2001 upon the World Trade Center and The Pentagon in the U.S., the relationship between Sudan and Uganda abruptly changed. The NIF government was anxious to avoid any blame that may be attached to them for their offering of sanctuary to al-Qaeda leader Osama bin Laden for several years in the 1990s. Also, following the LRA's designation as a terrorist organization by the U.S. State Department on 5 December 2001, Sudan agreed to stop supplying aid to the LRA.

Cross-border tensions were dialed down as support to proxy forces fell. The LRA itself appeared settled into their Sudanese base camps and only periodically crossed the border. Some of the hundreds of thousands of civilians displaced by the war began to return to their homes. The number of people displaced by the conflict declined to about half a million, and people began to talk openly of the day when the "protected camps" would be disbanded.

== See also ==
- Lord's Resistance Army insurgency (2002–2005)

== Notes and references ==
=== Works cited ===
- Connell, Dan (August 1998). "Sudan: Global Trade, Local Impact. Arms Transfers to all Sides in the Civil War in Sudan" (PDF). Human Rights Watch. 10 (4 (A)).
- Leopold, Mark (2001). "'Trying to Hold Things Together?' International NGOs caught up in an Emergency in North-Western Uganda, 1996–97". In Ondine Barrow; Michael Jennings (eds.). The Charitable Impulse: NGOs & Development in East & North-East Africa. Oxford, Bloomfield: James Curry Ltd; Kumarian Press. pp. 94–108. ISBN 9781565491373.
- Prunier, Gérard (July 2004). "Rebel Movements and Proxy Warfare: Uganda, Sudan and the Congo (1986-99)". African Affairs. 103 (412): 359–383. doi:10.1093/afraf/adh050. JSTOR 3518562.
- de Waal, Alex (April 2007). "Sudan: international dimensions to the state and its crisis" (PDF). Occasional Papers (Crisis States Research Centre) (2). ISSN 1753-3082.
