= Luigia Coccia =

Sister Luigia Coccia S.M.C.

Personal life
- Born: 1969

Religious life
- Religion: Catholic
- Institute: Comboni Missionary Sisters

Senior posting
- Present post: Member of Congregation for Institutes of Consecrated Life and Societies of Apostolic Life
- Previous post: Superior General, Comboni Missionary Sisters

Luigia Coccia S.M.C, is an Italian Roman Catholic religious sister and missionary, who is one of the first seven women appointed members of the Congregation for Institutes of Consecrated Life and Societies of Apostolic Life the second highest-ranking department of the Roman Curia, the administrative institution of the Holy See. She was appointed by Pope Francis on 8 July 2019

Coccia is an Italian religious sister, and a member of the Comboni Missionary Sisters (also known as the Pious Mothers of the Nigritia) an order which works as missionaries, mostly in Africa. From 2014 she was the provincial superior of her order for the Democratic Republic of the Congo and Togo, and before that the General Secretary for Formation. She comes from Ascoli Piceno in Italy, and joined the Comboni sisters in 1998. She spent three years in Cameroon before working in Congo. She has a degree in psychology from the Gregorian University in Rome.

On 21 September 2016 she was elected as the Superior General of Comboni Missionary Sisters, succeeding Luzia Premoli. In 2022 Anne Marie Quigg was elected as the new Superior General.

She was one of seven religious women appointed as a Member of Congregation for Institutes of Consecrated Life and Societies of Apostolic Life in 2019. They were appointed by Pope Francis, and were the first female members of this Vatican committee. Upon her appointment she said: "This is undoubtedly a historical event, since it means to recognize the irreplaceable role we have as religious sisters in this dicastery."
