= Barlonyo Memorial Site =

Memorial site in Lira district in Uganda

Coordinates: 2°28′34″N 32°59′35″E

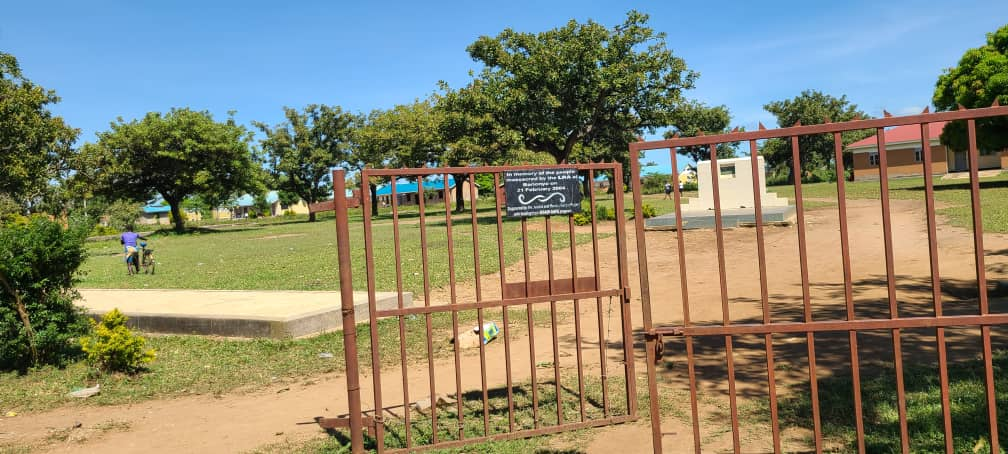
Barlonyo memorial site in Lira

The Barlonyo Memorial Site is also known as Barlonyo Monument or Barlonyo Massacre site is a mass grave where the 301 civilians who were massacred by the Lord Resistance Army on February 21, 2004 were buried. The monument was raised in memory of the people who were killed.

== Location ==
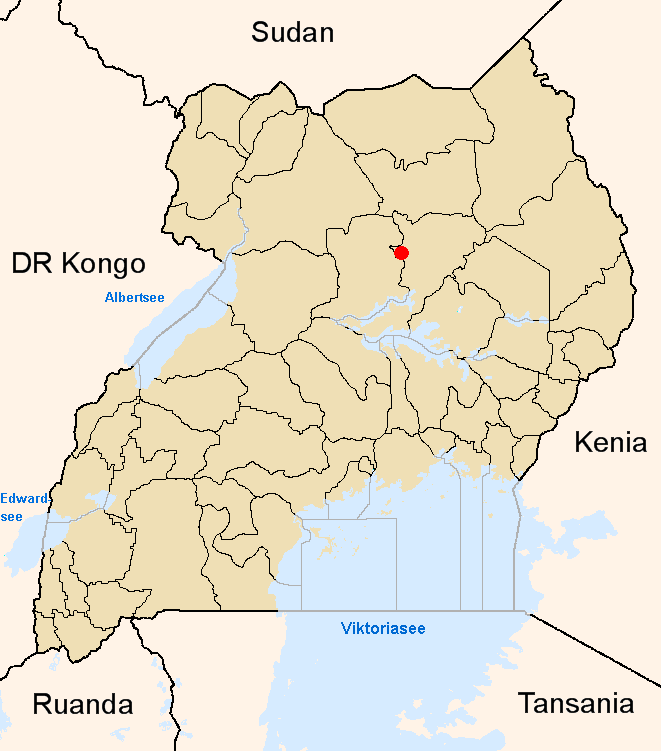
Lira district is a district located in Northern region of Uganda in the lango sub-region

The Barlonyo Monument is located at the Barlonyo refugee camp in Barlonyo village, Orit parish, current Agweng sub county found in Lira district. The Barlonyo memorial site is 26 km Northern part of Lira district in Northern Uganda. It is neighboring River Moroto.

== Massacre ==
On 21 February 2004 at around 17:00hrs, Lord's Resistance Army (LRA) rebels commanded by Okot Odiambo and Dominic Ongwen attacked the Barlonyo refugee camp where internally displaced people were living and indiscriminately mass slaughtered 300 people. The LRA rebels were disguised in military uniforms similar to that of the Amuka Aulliary force who were tasked to guard the camp, consisting of Langi men who assisted the Uganda People's Defense Force (UPDF) to execute their duties. At the time of attack, 11,643 people were being housed at the Barlonyo refugee camp.

The LRA rebels spent three days at the camp killing, and abducting people; pregnant women were forcibly dissected and their babies removed from the belly and burnt. Some people were burnt to death, while others were hacked with machetes, stabbed with knives, clubbed with sticks, and shot.

The LRA rebels also abducted 206 people of which 29 children were from the refugee camp. However, nine children were able to escape and return home.

The 301 people who were killed by LRA were buried in a mass grave estimated to be 200 meters long, leading to a funeral function which was presided over by Yoweri Kaguta Museveni, the president of Uganda.

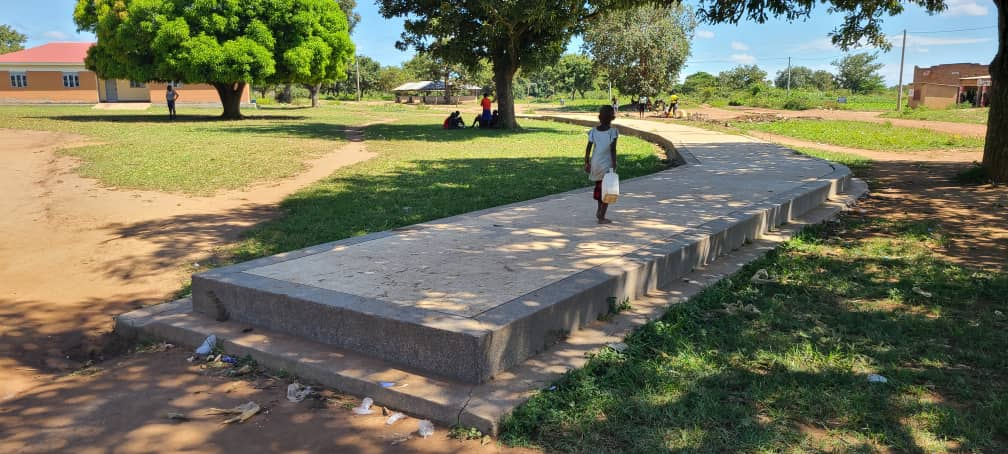
Barlonyo memorial site in ogur Lira district (2023)

=== Controversy ===
There are various claims concerning the total number of people killed during the attack. The government of Uganda reported a total of 124 people killed which deviates from the 300 people reported to be killed by district officials, aid workers and the local residents of Barlonyo

== Current state ==
The government of Uganda constructed Barlonyo Memorial vocational training school worth UGX 100 million to remember those who were mass slaughtered on February 21, 2004, and to empower disadvantaged children acquire life skills and accumulate wealth.

The Uganda government as also constructed facilities like Lira-Pader-Kitgum Highway which is 10 km long, water sources like boreholes and other solar powered facilities, Kaguta bridge which connect Lira to Pader, Otuke and Alebtong district.

The commemoration of the Barlonyo massacre is annually celebrated on February 21 to remember the lives which were man slaughtered on 2014-02-21.

== See also ==
- St Mary's College Secondary School Aboke
- Barlonyo
- The Arrow Boys Monument
- Aboke abductions
