= Luzia Premoli =

Brazilian Roman Catholic nun (born 1955)

Sister Luzia Premoli S.M.C.

Personal life
- Born: 23 March 1955 (age 71) Linhares, Brazil

Religious life
- Religion: Catholic
- Institute: Comboni Missionary Sisters

Senior posting
- Previous post: Superior General, Comboni Missionary Sisters

Luzia Premoli S.M.C (born 23 March 1955), is a Brazilian Roman Catholic sister and missionary, Superior General of the Comboni Missionary Sisters between 2010 and 2016 and the second female appointed in an office of the Roman Curia after Enrica Rosanna.

== Biography ==
Born in Linhares, Brazil, Luzia Premoli joined the Congregation of the Comboni Missionary Sisters and in 1983 took the temporal vows. After studying psychology she worked from 1989 to 1997 in Mozambique for an educational program for women. She was also involved in academic education at the inter-diocesan seminary and in teaching. In 1997, Luzia Premoli worked for the novice training of her order in Brazil and completed a degree in psycho-pedagogy. In 2005, she was elected Provincial Superior of the Comboni Missionary Sisters in the Province of Brazil.

On 20 September 2010, the General Chapter of the order chose Luzia Premoli as its new Superior General, becoming the first non-Italian in this role.

On 13 September 2014, Pope Francis appointed her member of the Congregation for the Evangelization of Peoples and thus she became the second woman ever to occupy an office of the Roman Curia but first to be appointed a member of a Vatican congregation (which is one of the higher ranking departments of the Roman Curia). She was quoted as saying "The appointment took me by surprise; I did not expect it … but I was also joyful, because the appointment is a concretization of Pope Francis’ wish for more women in high-ranking positions in the Catholic Church"

On 21 September 2016, she was succeeded by Luigia Coccia as head of the Combonian Sisters.
