= China Elections and Governance Website =

- Website type: Political reform website
- Available in: Chinese and English
- Founded: July 2002
- Founder: Yawei Liu
- Website: chinaelections.org

The China Elections and Governance Website, or China Elections and Governance Net, is a Chinese and English website focusing on political and election issues of China. It was co-launched in July 2002 by the Carter Center's China Program and the Institute of Comparative Politics and Economics of Renmin University of China. The website is operated by the Beijing Center for Policy Research and was funded by the Carter Center.

== Banned ==
China Elections and Governance Website (chinaelections.org) was repeatedly censored by the Chinese authorities. In 2012, the site was shut down for "making negative remarks about the 18th National Congress of the Chinese Communist Party".
