= Comboni Missionary Sisters =

Catholic religious institute

The Comboni Missionary Sisters (S.M.C.; Italian: Suore Missionarie Comboniane) are a Catholic religious institute originally founded under the name Pie Madri della Nigrizia, translated as the "Pious Mothers of the Nigritia" or "The Devout Mothers of Africa". They are also known as the Missionary Sisters Pie Madre della Nigrizia or the Missionary Sisters of Verona,

== History ==
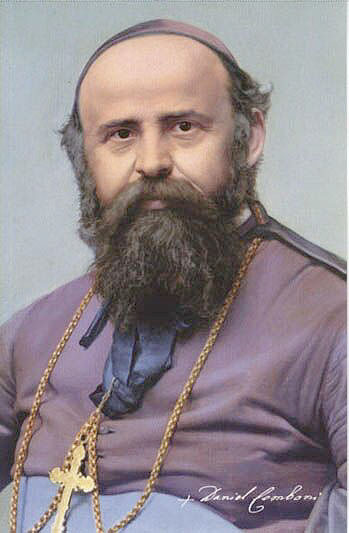
Daniele Comboni

Daniele Comboni was a missionary in Sudan briefly in 1858–1859. In 1864 he wrote a plan for the regeneration of Africa to focus the global Catholic Church's interest in the evangelization of the continent while emphasizing the African people themselves as agents of this evangelization. He established a male religious order, the Comboni Missionaries of the Heart of Jesus, on 1 June 1867. Comboni attempted to affiliate the male order with a female congregation to cooperate in missionary action (the Virgin of Charity). The attempt to set up the female branch failed and was postponed, so Comboni spoke to the Sisters of St. Joseph of the Apparition. With the support of these sisters and the Sacred Congregation for the Propagation of the Faith, Comboni founded the Institute of the Motherland of Nigrizia in Montorio Veronese in Verona, Italy on 1 January 1872.

On 8 December 1874, the bishop of Verona, Luigi di Canossa, handed over to the first eight aspirants the constitutions. He reviewed and approved and allowed them to start the novitiate. Comboni returned momentarily to Verona to receive the profession of the vows of the first two Sisters of his Congregation on 15 October 1876. The first Comboni sisters came to Africa in 1877.

Comboni died on 10 October 1881, around the same time that the Mahdist War in Sudan began. The order struggled with both a leadership vacuum and the loss of eight sisters who were held as prisoners by the Mahdist rebels. Eventually, Maria Bollezzoli, (Note: See her biography at the Comboni Missionary Sisters website.) who had joined the order on 6 September 1874, emerged as a strong first General Superior, and led the Pious Mothers through rapid development until her death in 1901.

Throughout Bollezzoli's lifetime, the Comboni sisters were active only in Egypt, Sudan, and at their motherhouse in Verona. Between 1900 and 1930, they spread into Eritrea, and the African Great Lakes region. Between 1930 and 1960, they spread even more to additional African countries, the United States, Latin America, the Middle East, and created new centers for novitiate formation in Europe.

== Formal recognition ==
The Congregation received the Papal Decree of Praise on 22 February 1897 and its constitutions were approved by the Holy See on 10 June 1912.

== Vision ==
Comboni founded the order not for nuns, but as strong-willed missionaries. He told the sisters not to hold their "head bent to one side, because in Africa one needs to hold the neck straight and be ready for lots of sacrifices and, if necessary, even for martyrdom." Contrary to typical views at the time, he regarded them as of equal dignity with the male missionaries in Africa, and wanted them to have the same training and practices. In his correspondence, Comboni sometimes described the ministry of missionary sisters as a "priesthood".

Comboni listed the activities of early sisters as "religious instruction, school, orphanages, refuges for slaves, nursing the sick in hospital and at home, baptism in harems and in pagan families".

== Activity and dissemination ==
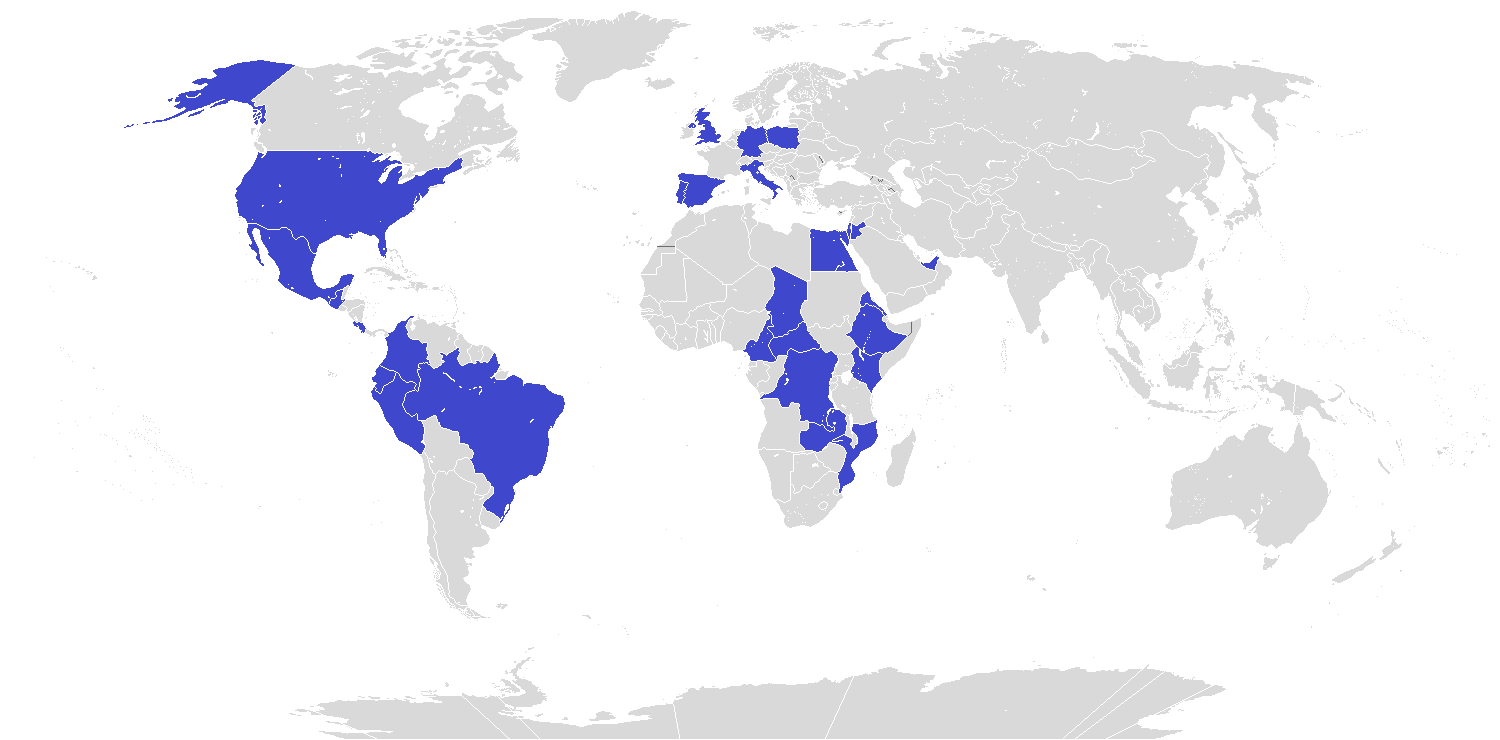
Map of countries where the Comboni Sisters are active.

While the specific purpose of the Comboni Sisters is missionary work among the peoples of Africa, they also work in the field of evangelization on other continents. The sisters are present in Europe (Germany, Italy, Poland, Portugal, United Kingdom, Spain), Africa (Cameroon, Central African Republic, Chad, Democratic Republic of Congo, Egypt, Eritrea, Ethiopia, Kenya, Mozambique, Zambia), the Americas (Brazil, Colombia, Costa Rica, Ecuador, Guatemala, Mexico, Peru, United States of America) and Asia (United Arab Emirates, Jordan, Israel); The headquarters is on Tito Livio Avenue in Rome.

On 19 Ottober 2022, Sr. Anne Maria Quigg was elected Superior General of the institute. On 31 December 2022, the congregation had 1,004 religious in 192 houses.

Collectively, the priests, sisters, and lay people engaged in the work of the institutes's apostolate are known as the Comboni Family. The Comboni Family holds an annual meeting and also undertakes work related to integral ecology. A Comboni Family Integral Ecology Forum was held in Belém, in Brazil, alongside the 2025 United Nations Climate Change Conference (COP30: 10–21 November 2025).

== Notable members ==
- Sr. Pia De Angelis, who has spent most of her missionary life in Egypt, was granted L’ONORIFICENZA UFFICIALE dell’Ordine della Stella D’Italia (The OFFICIAL HONOR of the Order of the Star of Italy) by the Italian Ambassador in Egypt, for her tireless work with the Italian community in connection with the Italian Embassy. This is not the first time Sr. Pia's work among the poor and the rich has been recognized. (on the 8th May 2023, at the venue of the Italian Embassy in Cairo)
- Sr. Gabriella Bottani, who was the coordinator of "Talitha Kum" - Uisg (International Union of Superiors General), was awarded the Heroes Award Winner in 2019, 2021.
- Sr. Alicia Vacas Moro, who was a nurse and leader in the Comboni Missionary Sisters, was awarded the International Women of Courage Award in 2021 after being nominated by the Holy See.
- Sr. Inma Cuesta, who was director of the Office of Ethnic Ministry of the Catholic Diocese of Richmond, was awarded the NCADDHM (The National Catholic Administration Diocesan Directors for Hispanic Ministry) 30th Anniversary National Recognition Awards in 2023.
- Sr. Rachele Fassera, who, while deputy headmistress of St Mary's College for Girls in Aboke, successfully negotiated the release of 109 students in the Aboke abductions in 1996
