= Lydia Nabunya Nsaale Kitayimbwa =

Ugandan chaplain

Lydia Nsaale Kitayimbwa
- Born: 1979 (age 46–47); Bwaise-Kawempe
- Citizenship: Uganda
- Education: Bachelor Degree in Statistics- Makerere University masters in Theology- UCU PHD in practical Theology- Stellenbosch University
- Occupation: Chaplain
- Years active: 2023
- Employer: Church of Uganda
- Notable work: Digitalization of church services in the church of Uganda
- Predecessor: Rev. Onesimus Asiimwe
- Spouse: Rev. Prof. John Kitayimbwa
- Children: Three biological children

Lydia Nabunya Nsaale Kitayimbwa (born April 1979), known as Digital Mama, is a Ugandan religious leader She is the first female chaplain of St. Francis Chapel at Makerere University.

== Early life ==
Kitayimbwa was born and raised in Bwaise-kawempe. She attended went St. Joseph Nsambya Girls' School for secondary education. In 2001, she enrolled at Makerere University to pursue a Bachelor of Statistics, which she completed in 2004. She pursued her master's degree at Uganda Christian University (UCU), school of Divinity and Theology. In 2019, she enrolled for her Doctoral Studies in practical theology at Stellenbosch University, South Africa which she earned in December 2022. Her research topic was "communicating the gospel in the digital age". She received the nickname "Digital Mama" from youths who attend online church platforms she ran as coordinator of the online church of Uganda during the COVID-19 lockdown.

== Career ==
In 2004, she worked as a volunteer at Watoto Church, Kampala. From 2005 to 2009, she worked with youth at the church. In 2015, she was ordained into chaplaincy at Uganda Christian University (UCU) where she served as a lecturer. On 5 April 2023, she was appointed director and twelfth chaplain of St. Francis Chapel, Makerere University and installed on 11 June 2023 by the Archbishop of the Church of Uganda, Stephen Kaziibma Mugalu.

She succeeded Reverend Onesimus Asiimwe, who became bishop of North Kigezi Diocese. On 29 February 2024, she was sworn in as a member of the Makerere University student disciplinary committee.

== Personal life ==
She grew up in an extended family. Her grandparents were ministers in the church of Uganda. She married Reverend Professor John Kitayimbwa, Deputy Vice Chancellor at Uganda Christian University.

== See also ==
- Diana Nkesiga
- Rebecca Margaret Nyegenye
