= TEDxViaDellaConciliazione =

- Venue: Auditorium Conciliazione, Rome, Italy
- Founded: 2013
- Founder: Father Héctor Guerra
- Area: Italy
- Major events: Conference
- Website: www.tedxviadellaconciliazione.com

TEDxViaDellaConciliazione is an independent TEDx event founded in 2013 by Father Héctor Guerra, a Mexican member of Legionaries of Christ. This initiative was independently organized by a group of entrepreneurs, artists, philanthropists, and educators, and incorporated as a non-profit NGO. The curators and organizers of the event have been led by Father Héctor Guerra and his co-curators Giovanna Abbiati, Luciano Giustini and Daniele Buzzurro according to TED philosophy.

The talks and performances presented at TEDxViaDellaConciliazione have had a national and an international resonance.

Prominent speakers were Brother Guy Consolmagno, Rabbi David Rosen, His Eminence Gianfranco Ravasi, Elizabeth Lev, Fernando Romero, Sheikha Hussah Sabah al-Salem al-Sabah, Soumaya Slim, Alicia Vacas Moro, Daniel Libeskind, Gloria Estefan, Vlade Divac, Barrie Schwortz, Wenzong Wang.

TEDxViaDellaConciliazione has been held once, in 2013, at the Auditorium Conciliazione, a theatre in Rome, which seats over 1,750 people.
