= Nairobi Agreement =

Nairobi Agreement refers to either:

- Nairobi Agreement, 1985, signed by Yoweri Museveni's National Resistance Movement and the Ugandan government of Tito Okello
- Nairobi Agreement, 1999, signed by the governments of Uganda and Sudan
