= Acheng =

Acheng may refer to:

- Acheng District, in Harbin, Heilongjiang, China
- Angelina Acheng, Ugandan human rights activist
- Ah Cheng, Chinese author and screenwriter
