= Angelina Atyam =

Ugandan human rights activist

- Born: Angelina Acheng; 1946 (age 79–80); Bobi, Uganda
- Occupations: Human rights activist, midwife
- Spouse: George Atyam
- Children: 6
- Awards: United Nations Prize in the Field of Human Rights, 1998

Angelina Acheng Atyam (born 1946) is a Ugandan human rights activist and midwife. In 1996, Atyam's daughter and 138 other girls were kidnapped from an Aboke school by guerrillas from the Lord's Resistance Army (LRA). Atyam founded the Concerned Parents Association to advocate for the release of the captive children and acted as the organization's spokesperson, travelling to Europe and the United States. In recognition of her work, she was awarded the United Nations Prize in the Field of Human Rights in 1998. Atyam was reunited with her daughter in 2004.

== Biography ==
Born Angelina Acheng in Bobi, Uganda, in 1946, Atyam is of Luo ethnic origin. A trained midwife, she settled in Lira after marrying George Atyam and gave birth to three sons and three daughters.

On 10 October 1996, she learnt that her daughter Charlotte, then 14, was one of 139 girls who had been kidnapped from St Mary's Catholic boarding school in Aboke by guerrillas from the Lord's Resistance Army (LRA). Thanks to the efforts of the headmistress, Sister Rachele Fassera, who followed them into the bush, 109 were released. Charlotte was among the 30 girls who were not freed; they were marched into southern Sudan, and would be held captive by the LRA for years to come. When Atyam, a devout Catholic, discovered that her daughter was being held by LRA commander Rasca Lukwiya as his wife, she visited Lukwiya's mother in a neighbouring village, and convinced her that she was ready to forgive her son, their family, their clan, and their ethnic group.

Along with other parents, Atyam founded the Concerned Parents Association. As its key spokesperson and campaigner, she travelled to northern Uganda calling for reconciliation. Her efforts to encourage the Ugandan government to negotiate with the LRA for the children's release were rebuffed, because officials refused to enter into discussions with terrorists. She publicised her cause across Europe and the United States.

Atyam and her advocacy for the abducted girls were widely covered by radio stations and other media outlets. The resulting pressure caused LRA leader Joseph Kony to offer to release Charlotte on the condition that Atyam agree to stop campaigning. She countered that she would do so only if all 30 girls were released. No agreement was reached. She later explained: "Somehow all those other children had become one in Charlotte. We could not pull the one away and leave the rest .... All those children had become my children."

Among those Atyam contacted for support were Ugandan President Yoweri Museveni, the Sudanese government, First Lady of the United States Hillary Clinton, members of the United States Congress, and United Nations agencies. These efforts led to adoption by the US Congress of a resolution condemning the abduction of Ugandan children, and calling upon Sudan to secure the release of those still in captivity.

In 1998, Atyam received the United Nations Human Rights Prize. On 23 October 2002, she reported to the United Nations Security Council on further atrocities by the LRA. She informed the council that during a period of 17 years, over 14,000 children had been abducted by the LRA in northern Uganda, and these children represented 85% of the rebels' forces. Those in captivity were forced to fight in armed combat and made to kill and mutilate other child soldiers. Many were raped and bore children. At the time of their release, over half of the children had HIV or AIDS or other sexually transmitted diseases. Many of their families refused to accept them.

By 2004, although abductions had decreased, it was estimated that some 2,000 women and children were still in the hands of the LRA, forced to be soldiers and sex slaves.

In July 2004, Atyam was reunited with her daughter. Charlotte had escaped from the LRA with her five-year-old son. Her two-year-old son was found the same day.

Atyam is remembered for her messages of forgiveness. She opposed the Ugandan government's tendency to pursue a military solution to the LRA, because of the large number of child soldiers in the LRA's ranks. "Let us think about forgiving," she once said, "because if we don’t forgive these rebels, we are signing the death warrants of our own children." Now retired, she continues to live in northern Uganda.

== See also ==
- Aboke abductions
- Gulu District
