= Diana Nkesiga =

Anglican priest from Uganda

Reverend Diana Nkesiga
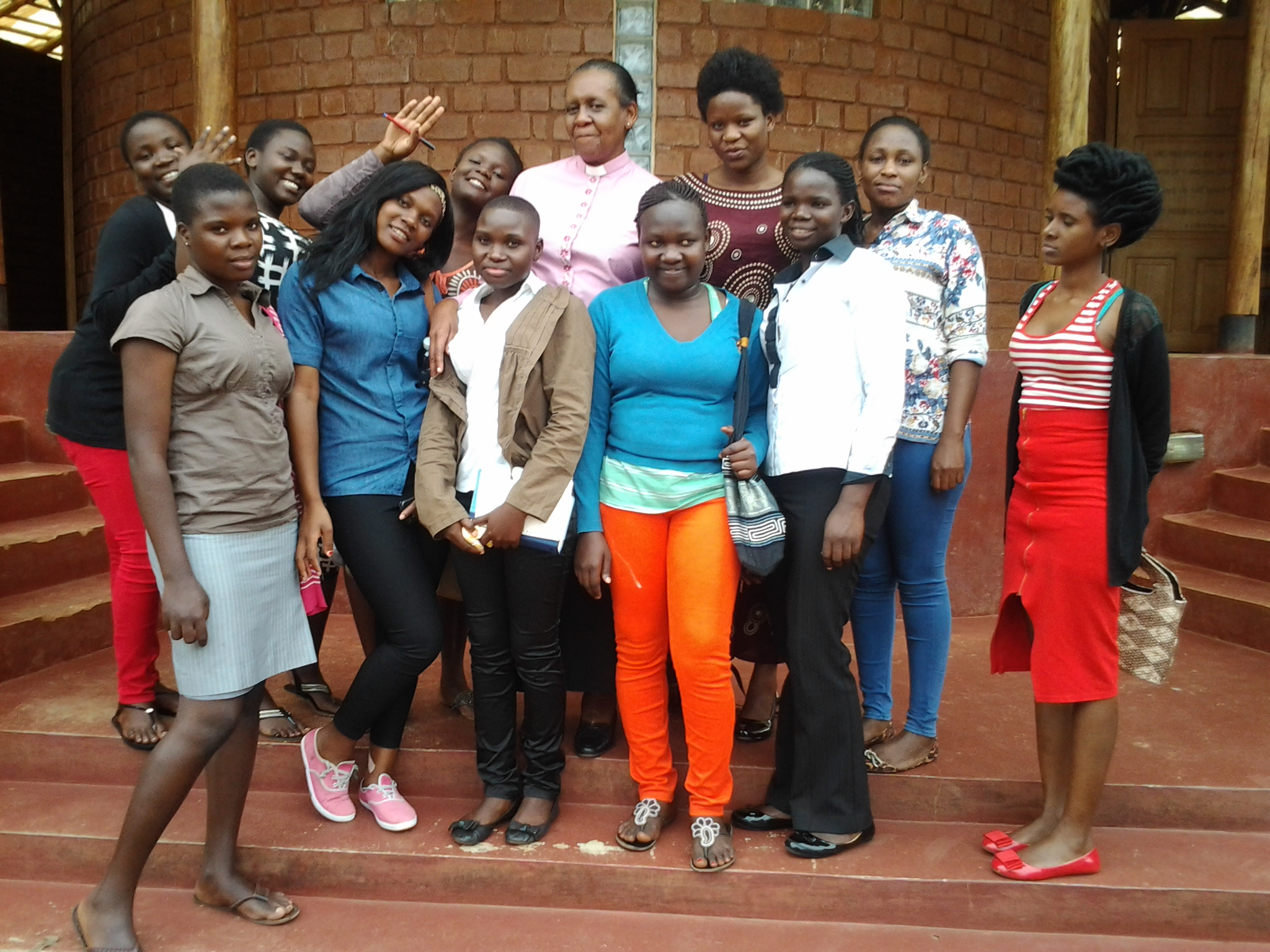
- Reverend Diana Nkesiga (top centre, the woman in pink) at the Phumla Retreat Centre in Kampala, which she founded and owned with her husband, the late Solomon Nkesiga

Personal life
- Born: Diana Mirembe Barlow; 1960 (age 65–66) Munyonyo
- Spouse: Solomon Nkesiga († 2015, aged 55)
- Children: Ignatius Nkesiga, Themba Nkesiga, Edith Nagawa, Evelyn Namugumya
- Education: Kyambogo University; Bishop Tucker Theological College
- Website: Facebook profile

Religious life
- Religion: Christianity
- Denomination: Anglican church
- Ordination: 1994

Diana Nkesiga is an Anglican priest from Uganda. She was one of the first women to be ordained by the Anglican Church of Uganda. After earning her degree in theology, she was denied ordination but was permitted to become a commissioned worker in 1989 and a deacon in 1991. Passed over for the priesthood in 1992, she pushed authorities in both Uganda and then South Africa, where she was doing mission work to allow her to be ordained. Finally in 1994, she was ordained by the Anglican Church in Uganda. Returning to South Africa, she had difficulty finding a placement as a priest until Bishop Desmond Tutu intervened. After 13 years in South Africa, she returned to Uganda in 2005. She is a former Vicar of All Saints' Cathedral in Kampala.

== Biography ==
Diana Mirembe Barlow was born in 1960, in Munyonyo to Mary Nantongo and Hugo Barlow. After attending Nakasero Primary School and Gayaza High School, she entered the National Teacher's College Kyambogo in 1981. She graduated in 1983 with her certification as a teacher for English and religious education. When she completed her degree, she taught at Gayaza High School for three years before entering Bishop Tucker Theological College in 1986 in Mukono. Barlow met fellow student Solomon Nkesiga in September, 1986 and after a three-year friendship, they decided to marry and were wed at St. Francis Chapel in Makerere in 1989, the year of her graduation.

Solomon's first position was to teach at the Anglican Martyr’s Theological Seminary in Namugongo Nkesiga was given a status of commissioned worker in 1989, by the Anglican Church, but she was not allowed to preach. Commissioned workers were people who were not ordained but were more highly educated than lay readers, and were either unpaid or paid significantly less than ordained clergy. Instead, she made money from selling tomato sauce, which she had learned to make at a trade show. It was the era of war in Uganda, with the Ugandan Bush War followed by the insurgency and life was difficult. Nkesiga was made a deacon in 1991, and was scheduled to be ordained as a priest in 1992, but was passed over for the ceremony due to her pregnancy with the couple's second son. Later that year, they were offered the chance to do missionary work in South Africa and moved to the Diocese of Grahamstown, in Grahamstown, South Africa.

As Nkesiga was not allowed to preach, she raised their two sons and two adopted daughters and started a school which she called Stepping Stones, an English-speaking Christian school. She ran the school out of her own home, with her own funds until the church and the government later stepped in and provided funding. In 1994, they brought the question of female ordination to the Church of the Province of Southern Africa and it was rejected; however, Bishop Misaeri Kauma of Namirembe Cathedral called for her ordination in Uganda. Though his tenure ended, Bishop Balagadde Ssekadde, ordained her in 1994. She returned to South Africa, but no parish would have her and she was posted as a university chaplain at the University of Port Elizabeth. She received half the pay of male colleagues, with no benefits. A photograph taken of her around this time shows her in her collar, in front of a church holding a placard saying, “Unemployed female priest, two sons, one husband. God bless.” The turning point came in 1995, when Bishop Desmond Tutu insisted on her performing a communion service with him as the first participant in the rite. In 1997, Nkesiga began to work with HIV/AIDS programs. She was the first female pastor hired at Saint Augustine Church in the Anglican Diocese of Port Elizabeth and she served as chaplain for both the University of Port Elizabeth and the Port Elizabeth Technikon until they closed in 2004. At that time, she became the Chaplain at the St Francis Hospice and remained with that organization until the end of November 2005 when she returned to Uganda after 13 years in South Africa.

Initially upon return to Uganda, Nkesiga worked with Viva Network Africa, before being appointed Vicar of All Saints’ Cathedral in 2007. Nkesiga's husband Solomon, born 5 February 1960, died 23 March 2015, aged 55.

== See also ==
- Rebecca Margaret Nyegenye
- Lydia Nabunya Nsaale Kitayimbwa

== Bibliography ==
- Gunda, Masiiwa Ragies, ed. (2011). From Text to Practice - The role of the Bible in daily living of African people today. Bible In Africa Studies. Vol. 4. Bamberg, Germany: University of Bamberg Press. ISBN 978-3-86309-004-3.
