= Grace Akallo =

Ugandan activist (born 1981)

- Born: 1981 (age 44–45)
- Citizenship: Uganda, United States of America
- Education: St. Mary's College (Aboke, Uganda); Uganda Christian University (Mukono, Uganda); Gordon College (Wenham, Massachusetts); Master's in International Development and Social Change from Clark University (Worcester, Massachusetts)
- Occupation: Activist
- Known for: Human rights activism; African women's and children's rights activism; Rehabilitation of former child soldiers
- Notable work: Girl Soldier: A Story of Hope for Northern Uganda's Children (co-authored)
- Spouse: Jonathan Day
- Children: Jonathan Day Jr.

Grace Akallo (born 1981) is a Ugandan woman who was abducted in 1996 to be used as a child soldier in the Lord's Resistance Army (LRA), a rebel military group led by Joseph Kony. At the time of her abduction, Akallo was 15 years old and attending St. Mary's College, a Catholic boarding school in Aboke, Uganda. She remained in the LRA for seven months before escaping. After escaping the army, Akallo returned to St. Mary's College to finish her high school education. She began her college education at the Uganda Christian University, but finished her undergraduate degree at Gordon College after receiving a scholarship. Akallo then went on to receive her master's degree from Clark University. Upon her escape from the LRA, Akallo began working as an advocate for peace and for the rights of African women and children. She has been using both her experiences as a child soldier and the information she has gained in her higher education to advocate against violence and the use of child soldiers, as well as to help counsel other escaped child soldiers like herself.

Akallo has since worked for different organizations, such as the Sister Rachelle Rehabilitation Centre and World Vision, as well as worked on several different advocacy projects, including contributing to the passage of amendments to the 2008 Child Soldiers Accountability Act. and delivering speeches about her experience as a former child soldier Akallo has also started a non-profit organization in America called United Africans for Women and Children's Rights (UAWCR), aiming to protect the rights of African women and children; and cofounded the Network of Young People Affected by War through UNICEF. Several biographical texts and documentaries have been written and produced documenting the experiences of Akallo and her fellow child soldiers, most notably being the 2007 autobiography; Girl Soldier: A Story of Hope for Northern Uganda's Children, co-authored with Faith J. H. McDonnell, the 2015 biography Grace Akallo and the Pursuit of Justice for Child Soldiers written by Kem Knapp Sawyer, and the 2010 documentary Grace, Milly, Lucy... Child Soldiers produced by Raymonde Provencher.

== Lord's Resistance Army (LRA) ==
Akallo was abducted into the Lord's Resistance Army (LRA) on 9 October 1996, when she was just 15 years old. October 9 is Uganda's Independence Day, normally a day of celebration; however, on this day, Akallo and 138 other young girls were abducted from their dorm room at St. Mary's College by a group of LRA rebel soldiers.

On the night of Akallo's abduction, the LRA soldiers broke into the dorm through the windows while the girls and their dormitory supervisor, Alupu Jemma Obace, tried to run and hide. The LRA soldiers tied the young girls to a rope and forced them to walk for an entire night, threatening to kill them if they did not obey. The next morning, the LRA soldiers released 109 of the children back to the school's headmistress, Sister Rachelle, after she pleaded with LRA Commander Laguira, but Akallo was one of the 30 girls who was left behind.

Akallo and the other abductees were forced to march to Sudan––a walk that took them two weeks to complete––carrying loads of heavy supplies. The LRA soldiers also abducted more children along the way, passing through the villages of Gulu and Kitgum, specifically, on their way to Sudan. When one of the girls tried to escape, Akallo and the others were forced to beat her until one of the rebels killed the girl with an axe. In the documentary Grace, Milly, Lucy... Child Soldiers, Akallo recounts how Commander Laguira told them: "Forget about Uganda. If you ever escape, that is what is going to happen to you." The child soldiers were forced to obey or they would be beaten and/or killed.

The LRA soldiers took Akallo and the other abducted children to Sudan, where they were trained to be child soldiers. They were beaten and tortured and forced to kill other children in the group who had disobeyed orders. During her time in the LRA, Akallo was trained to march and to clean, dismantle, and assemble an AK-47 rifle, but she had to learn how to use the rifle on her own. Akallo and her fellow child soldiers were forced to fight against the Sudan People's Liberation Army (SPLA), having to rely heavily on their instincts for survival. She learned to shoot a rifle during the first raid she was a part of in a group of 700 randomly selected child soldiers. The children were organized into rows and told to raid a village for food and shoot at the villagers.

The female child soldiers experienced violence in another way as well. Despite their young ages, the girls, including Akallo, were also sexually assaulted by the LRA soldiers, who raped and beat them. Each girl was given to a leader of the LRA to become one of their "wives". Akallo says that "to become somebody's wife forcefully, it affects your spirit forever", in Grace, Milly, Lucy... Child Soldiers. Though Akallo herself did not become pregnant, many of the young girls did, later returning home with children and having been infected by sexually transmitted diseases such as HIV/AIDS. The child mothers were still forced to fight in the war, both while pregnant and while carrying children on their backs.

At one point during the war, exhaustion and dehydration caused Akallo to faint. The LRA soldiers thought she was dead and had the other child soldiers dig a grave for her body. She also tried to shoot herself on two different occasions. In Grace, Milly, Lucy... Child Soldiers, Akallo says: "I escaped death many times."

There was an attack on the LRA by a group in southern Sudan on 9 April 1997. Akallo took this as her chance to finally escape the army. She ran away and hid for three days in the bushes, finding a group of other escaped child soldiers on her fourth day in hiding. They were found by Ugandan soldiers who helped them to return home to their families. The escaped child soldiers were driven back to Uganda where their parents and one of the Sisters from St. Mary's College, Sister Akali, met them.

Akallo had been held captive by the LRA, subject to abuse and forced to fight and kill, for seven months before escaping.

== Education ==
Akallo's education has always been very important to her. She attended St. Mary's College, a Catholic boarding school in Aboke, Uganda, for high school. Her education there was interrupted, however, when she was abducted by the LRA and forced to fight as a child soldier. After escaping from the army seven months later, Akallo returned to St. Mary's College in order to complete her high-school education, and on graduating, she began her college education at the Uganda Christian University (UCU) in Mukono, Uganda. At UCU, she met students attending Gordon College in Wenham, Massachusetts who were there on a student exchange program. She applied and received a scholarship to finish her undergraduate degree at Gordon College. There, Akallo majored in Communications with a desire to continue studying international relations and conflict resolution. She graduated Gordon College in 2007 before starting grad school at Clark University in Worcester, Massachusetts in 2008. Akallo received her master's degree in International Development and Social Change from Clark University.

== Activism and career ==
After returning home from the war, Akallo returned to school. However, her community has not looked favourably upon the returned child soldiers. They have been ostracized for their actions in the army; and girls face further stigmatization because of them having been raped. Community members often fear the former child soldiers and many parents have not accept their children back into their families, particularly the girls who came home with children of their own. Some believe that the child soldiers were "possessed by evil spirits". Though Akallo was accepted by her own family, this lack of support made returning home for most child soldiers particularly difficult, and many children have considered returning to the rebels or joining the military to avoid this.

Akallo realized she could help rehabilitate other former child soldiers, like herself. She decided to begin working as an advocate for peace and for the rights of African women and children. In a 2013 interview with UNICEF, Akallo says: "Even children who spent more than 10 years in captivity can get better with the right support, education, training, by being accepted in society."

Akallo's activism began when she returned to St. Mary's College to finish high school. She worked alongside the headmistress, Sister Rachelle, at the Sister Rachelle Rehabilitation Centre to help counsel other escaped child soldiers.

Later, when she was in college at the Uganda Christian University (UCU), Akallo started giving speeches about her experiences as a child soldier. While at UCU, she was invited to travel to New York City, New York to give a speech for Amnesty International. Akallo soon after transferred to Gordon College and was invited to be a spokesperson for World Vision, as well as tell her story on CNN and The Oprah Winfrey Show. In addition, Akallo has been asked to give many speeches at many educational establishments, raising awareness by sharing her story and the stories of other former child soldiers. Some of these schools include Rutgers University in 2004 and Brandeis University in 2009. She also delivered a speech to the World Bank in Washington, DC in 2009 during a conference discussing violence prevention; and a speech to the UN Security Council during a 2009 open debate on Children and Armed Conflict in connection to the Office of the Special Representative of the Secretary-General for Children and Armed Conflict.

Akallo wants to share her story in an effort to raise awareness of the effects of violence on children involved in war and what action can be done to stop the violence and rehabilitate ex-child soldiers. In her advocacy, Akallo pays particular attention to the stories of young girls as their stories are not usually highlighted and they often suffer more than boys from being child soldiers as they have been subjected to sexual assault and rape. In the documentary Grace, Milly, Lucy... Child Soldiers, Akallo says that helping to counsel and rehabilitate former child soldiers is especially important because "if we allow them to be a lost generation, it's not just this generation that is going to be lost".

Akallo has also catalysed action in Washington D.C. to help end the violence in Uganda by lobbying to the US Congress and delivering testimonies. She delivered a testimony during the hearing for amendments to the 2008 Child Soldiers Accountability Act, which helped contribute to the passage of those amendments. This act prohibits the use of child soldiers and serves to punish those who do.

Akallo has also been in touch with a non-profit organization in Uganda called Empowering Hands. Though she is not one of the founders, nor works directly for the organization, Empowering Hands was founded by a group of former LRA child soldiers, some of whom were in the same camp as Akallo had been. Co-founders Milly Auma, Lucy Lanyero, Jennifer Achora, and Sara Ayero appear in Grace, Milly, Lucy... Child Soldiers with Akallo, along with a number of other women involved in the programme. Their goal is to counsel and rehabilitate female ex-child soldiers and help them reunite with their communities and have a chance at a better future.

Most notably, in 2009, Akallo started a non-profit organization in America called United Africans for Women and Children's Rights (UAWCR) that aims to protect the rights of African women and children. In addition, she cofounded the Network of Young People Affected by War (NYPAW) through UNICEF in 2008, along with others who were affected by violence, including Ishmael Beah, Kon Kelei, Emmanuel Jal, Shena A. Gacu, and Zlata Filipović. The goal of NYPAW is to form connections between different countries where children have been affected by violence as child soldiers and reach out to find what aid those young people need and want to better help them.
