= Rachele Fassera =

Italian Roman Catholic nun (born 1946)

Sister Rachele Fassera SMC

Personal life
- Born: 15 June 1946 (age 80) Pessina Cremonese, Italy

Religious life
- Religion: Catholic
- Institute: Comboni Missionary Sisters

Rachele Fassera SMC (born 15 June 1946) is an Italian Roman Catholic religious sister and missionary. While the deputy headmistress of St Mary's College for Girls in Aboke, Uganda, she successfully negotiated the release of 109 students in the Aboke abductions in 1996.

== Early life ==
Fassera was born in Pessina Cremonese, a small village in the Province of Cremona. She has a twin brother and two sisters. Regarding her adolescence, she stated, "I was a real teenager, went to the cinema, the disco, and had boyfriends." She began working as a secretary at the age of 15, however, after tagging along with a friend to church, she decided to become a Roman Catholic missionary nun, though her family initially did not approve. She completed her education to become a biology teacher.

== Career ==
Fassera briefly lived in the United States and Eritrea before being posted to Uganda with the Comboni Missionary Sisters in 1982. In 1985, she began teaching biology at St Mary's College for Girls, a residential boarding school in Aboke, where she was later appointed deputy headmistress.

On 10 October 1996, a group of rebels from the Lord's Resistance Army (LRA) broke into St Mary's College for Girls and abducted 139 students, who ranged in age from 13 to 16. Fassera and a fellow teacher, John Bosco, tracked down the rebels and pleaded for the students' release, with Fassera offering to take their place. She successfully negotiated the release of 109 students, with the remaining 30 being kept as captives for the LRA. Following the abduction, Fassera and the Concerned Parents Association met with Yoweri Museveni, Nelson Mandela, Kofi Annan, Omar al-Bashir, Muammar Gaddafi, Bill Clinton, and Pope John Paul II to advocate for the remaining captive students and pressure the LRA to release them.

Three of Fassera's students that remained in captivity were Grace Akallo, Victoria Nyanjura, and Angela Atim Lakor, who were eventually able to escape the LRA and later became community activists. Fassera later moved back to Italy, settling in Rome. As of 2017, she lives in a Roman Catholic parish in Dubai.

== Legacy ==
In 1997, Fassera received the Guinness Power of Goodness Award for her role in the Aboke students' release. In 2005, she received a Catholic Womens' Honouree Award in Kampala. In 2011, she received the Servitor Pacis Award from The Path to Peace Foundation. The Rachele Rehabilitation Centre in Lira was named after her.
