= Els De Temmerman =

Belgian journalist

- Born: 10 February 1962 (Age 63) Belgium
- Citizenship: Belgian
- Known for: Journalist, Author, Humanitarian
- Title: Journalist and Humanitarian

Els De Temmerman (born 10 February 1962, in Oudenaarde) is a Belgian former journalist who founded an organization aimed at stopping the recruitment of children, providing psychological and educational support through its rehabilitation of child soldiers in Africa and work to earn a living to avoid being recruited in the future. She is also the author of Aboke Girls, a novel about the 1996 Aboke abductions in Northern Uganda.

== Career ==
Between 1984 and 1987, Temmerman was a lecturer at Feng Chia University, Taichung in the Republic of China. She worked as an aid with Médecins Sans Frontières in Sudan, from 1987 to 1988. From 1988 until 1990, she worked as a staff reporter at Het Volk. Still a staff reporter at Wereldwijd, Belgian development magazine, from 1990 to 1992. She served as Africa correspondent for De Volkskrant-news paper in the Netherlands and BRT- Belgian Radio and Television based in Nairobi, from 1992 until 1995.

Temmerman was the advisor to the Belgian minister for Development cooperation in Brussels, between 1995 and 1996. From 1996 to 1997, she worked as African correspondent-also for De Volkskrant and BRT in Kampala the capital and largest city of Uganda. And from 1997 to 1999, Africa correspondent for De Morgen-Belgian daily and VTM Flemish television based in South Africa. Around 2000 and 2002, she was a columnunist for De standard- Belgian daily, Lecturer on Africa and Assistant in the European Parliament and ACP-EU joint Parliamentary Assembly. From 2000 upto date, she is the founder and Executive director of Sponsoring children Uganda. She was the coordinator of Rachele Rehabilitation Centre in Lira, Uganda, from 2003 until 2006. Then from 2006 to 2010, she worked as Editor-in-Chief in the New Vision.

== Background and education ==
Temmerman studied German philology at KULAK after graduating from secondary school. She graduated in 1984 in Leuven. Before her career as a journalist, she taught at Feng Chia University, Taiwan. She also worked with Doctors Without Borders (MSF) in Sudan.On 12 November 2006, she was appointed editor-in-chief of the Ugandan-based newspaper, New Vision. This appointment took effect on 1 December 2006. She resigned in October 2008. In 2010, the UN entrusted Els De Temmerman to establish an asylum for child soldiers in north-east Congo, which she opened in 2013.

== Personal life ==
Els De Temmerman is married to Johan Van Hecke, a Belgian politician who lives in Oosterzele. In 2008, she and Van Hecke became owners of the hotel Cassia Lodge in Uganda. On the 7th of July 2011, she gave birth to twin daughters. In 2018, De Temmerman and Van Hecke sold Cassia Lodge, after which she started a new hotel called Kaazi Beach Resort.

== Awards ==
Temmerman received Dick Scherpenzeel Award from the Dutch Minister of Development Cooperation in Netherlands, 1994. She was the media person of the year in Belgium, 1994 and Woman of the year-Belgium in 1995. She got the prize of the Dutch Daily Press-Netherlands in 1995. She also received the Award of the Catholic University of Kortrijk in Belgium, 2001 and Gulden spoor Award, 2004.

She got Guinness power of goodness award in Uganda, 2004. She received vocational service award from the Rotary Club Kampala for outstanding community service through Journalism in Uganda from 2004 to 2005.

== Publication ==
- The Horn of Agony, Sudan, Ethiopia and Somalia Davidsfonds, Belgium, 1992
- The Dead are Alive : Rwanda, an eyewitness De Arbeiderspers, The Netherlands, 1994 (also a movie)
- Africa, Continents in Motion Icarus/De Standaard, Belgium, 1997
- Africa in a Vicious Circle Muller Lecture for the Diplomatic Corps in the Hague, the Netherlands, 2000
- Aboke Girls, abducted Children in northern Uganda Scoop, Belgium, 2000/Fountain Publishers, Uganda, 2001 (also translated in Spanish, Italian and French)
- Open letter on Globalisation, The Debate Cabinet of the Belgian Prime Minister, 2001
- And then I had to bite to death my brother Houtekiet, 2007

== See also ==
- Joseph Kony
- Yoweri Museveni
