= Barlonyo =

- Location in Uganda
- Coordinates: 2.41667°N 32.94278°E
- Country: (Uganda)
- Region: Northern Uganda
- Sub-region: Lango sub-region
- District: Lira District
- Sub-county: Ogur
- Elevation: 1,080 m (3,540 ft)

Barlonyo (also Bar Lonyo, meaning "field of wealth" in Luo)Barlonyo is a village in northern Uganda near Lira town, where a number of internally displaced people (IDPs) from parts of northern Uganda lived, as a result of a 20-year LRA insurgency. It is located in Orit Parish, at the North-eastern end of Ogur sub-county in Lira District. It is a 45-minute drive from Lira town.

At the center of this conflict is the Lord's Resistance Army (LRA) led by Joseph Kony. The LRA is a rebel group that had bases in Acholi sub Region of northern Uganda. It was formed in 1987. The rebels have been accused of many atrocities in the area, including kidnapping children to train as soldiers or use as sex slaves. The Ugandan government blamed the LRA for a massacre of over 200 civilians at the IDP camp in Barlonyo on February 21, 2004. Unofficial reports indicate that somewhere between 300 and 500 people were either massacred or went missing that day (according to locals, the government has allegedly tried to abbreviate the toll). The camp has since been disbanded by the government. Plans are in high gear to open a polytechnic school in the area in memory of the killings.

== See also ==
- Barlonyo Memorial Site
