= Victoria Nyanjura =

Ugandan community activist

- Nyanjura in 2020
- Born: circa 1982 (age 43–44); Oyam District, Uganda
- Education: St. Mary's College Aboke (High School Diploma); Kyambogo University (Bachelor of Development Studies); Uganda Management Institute (Postgraduate Diploma in Monitoring and Evaluation); University of Notre Dame (Master of Global Affairs)
- Years active: 2004–present
- Known for: Gender activism
- Title: Founder of Women in Action for Women (WAW), an NGO

Victoria Nyanjura (born circa 1982) is a Ugandan community activist, who is the founder of Women in Action for Women (WAW), a Ugandan-based non-governmental organization, that attempts to improve the lives of young people and women through vocational training, business education and guidance in accessing community and government services.

== Background and education ==
Nyanjura was born in Oyam District, in the Lango sub-region, in the Northern Region of Uganda. She attended primary school locally. She obtained her High School Diploma from St. Mary's College Aboke, in Kole District.

Her first degree, a Bachelor of Development Studies, was obtained from Kyambogo University, in Kampala, Uganda's capital city. As of February 2020, she is pursuing a Master of Global Affairs, specializing in International Peace Studies at the University of Notre Dame. She also holds a Postgraduate Diploma in Monitoring and Evaluation, awarded by Uganda Management Institute, also in Kampala.

== Career ==
Nyanjura worked as a volunteer at the Justice & Reconciliation Project, a non-governmental organization that aims at rehabilitation war-ravaged communities in Northern Uganda, based in the city of Gulu. She later became an employee at the NGO, in its Gender Justice department. She has also worked at International Justice Mission, another NGO, focused on protecting Ugandan widows on property ownership.

== Other considerations ==
In 1996, at the age of 14 years, Nyanjura was one of the 139 girls abducted from St. Mary's College Aboke on 10 October 1996, by rebels of the Lord's Resistance Army. The deputy headmistress of the college, Sister Rachele Fassera of Italy, pursued the rebels and successfully negotiated the release of 109 of the girls. 30 of the girls were retained by the rebels. Nyanjura was one of the 30. After eight years in captivity, characterized by torture and sexual abuse, she was able to escape and regain her freedom in 2004.

== Recognition and awards ==
In 2018, she was the recipient of the Navarra International Solidarity Award, organized by the Government of Navarre, Spain, and Laboral Kutxa, a Spanish credit union. The award recognizes individuals, NGOs, and institutions whose work advances the United Nations Sustainable Development Goals. She shared the award, and a €25,000 prize with three other African women, Hulo Guillabert, Theresa Kachindamoto and Oumou Sall-Seck. The group was nominated by the Spanish diplomatic organization Casa África.

== See also ==
- Angela Atim Lakor
- List of kidnappings
- Lists of solved missing person cases
