= Angela Atim Lakor =

Ugandan community activist

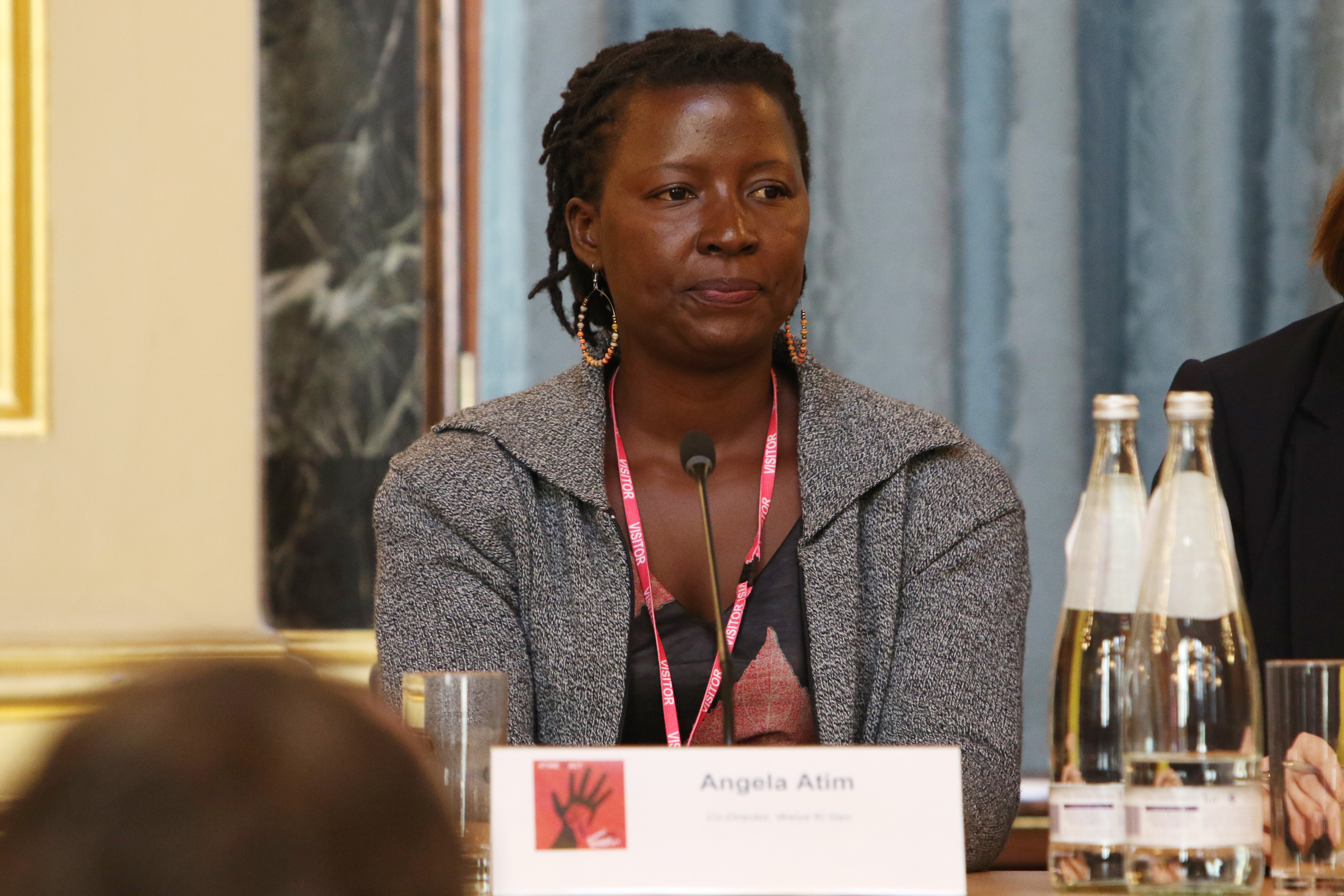
- Lakor at the Preventing Sexual Violence in Conflict conference in 2017
- Born: 1982 (age 43–44); Uganda
- Citizenship: Ugandan
- Occupation: Community Activist
- Years active: 2012 – present
- Known for: Community Activism
- Title: Founder of Watye Ki Gen Organisation

Angela Atim Lakor (born 1982), also Angela Lakor Atim, is a female Ugandan community activist, who is the co-founder of the Watye Ki Gen (We Have Hope) organisation, which supports former female abductees of the Lord's Resistance Army (LRA). The organisation assists the female returnees with their children's education and helps the families to cope with the stigma of association with the LRA.

== Background and education ==
She was born in the Northern Region of Uganda in 1982. In October 1996, at the age of 14 years, while a student at Saint Mary's College Aboke, a Catholic boarding school for girls aged 14 to 19 years, the rebels of the LRA attacked the school and abducted 139 girls. Sister Rachele Fassera, the deputy headmistress of the school, followed the rebels into the bush, and negotiated the release of 109 of the girls. 30 girls were retained by the rebels. Angela Atim was one of the 30.

== Captivity ==
In captivity, Angela and her fellow abductees were marched off to Sudan. She was "married off" to one of the LRA commanders and suffered tremendous physical, psychological and sexual abuse over the years. She mothered children of her rapists while there.

== Career after captivity ==
Angela was able to disengage from LRA captivity in 2012, 16 years after her abduction. She received support from the Children of War Reintegration Centre in the city of Gulu, that is operated by World Vision. Later, she co-founded the Watye Ki Gen non-profit, which assists fellow female returnees with re-integration issues.

In recognition of her efforts and leadership, she was awarded the Marsh Award for Peace Making and Peace Building, by Wilton Park, an agency of the United Kingdom Foreign and Commonwealth Office. The presentation was in London in November 2017. The annual Marsh Award is presented to participants nominated for making significant contribution to peace making and peacekeeping.

In June 2014, Angela spoke to the United Nations chiefs and to government leaders from 140 countries at the "Global Summit to End Sexual Violence in Conflict", held in London and chaired by William Hague and Angelina Jolie.

== See also ==
- Victoria Nyanjura
