= Rebecca Margaret Nyegenye =

Ugandan Anglican priest

The Very Reverend Rebecca Margaret Nyegenye
- Dean of All Saints' Cathedral, Kampala
- Church: Church of Uganda
- Appointed: 2019
- Other posts: Chaplain, Uganda Christian University (2012–2019)

Orders
- Ordination: 1997 (diaconate); 2000 (priesthood)

Personal details
- Education: Uganda Christian University; Trinity School for Ministry; University of KwaZulu-Natal

Rebecca Margaret Nyegenye is a Ugandan Anglican priest who is the first female dean of the Church of Uganda. She has also served as the chaplain of Uganda Christian University.

== Early life and education ==
Rebecca Margaret Nyegenye was born in the Eastern District of Busia, Uganda, to the late Reverend James Efumbi and Janet Efumbi. She is the second of seven children. Nyegenye attended Namugodi Primary School and Busia Senior Secondary School before earning her Bachelor of Divinity from Uganda Christian University. She also holds a Certificate in Theology from Bishop Usher Wilson Theological College Buwalasi, a Master of Arts in theology from Trinity Episcopal School for Ministry in the United States, and a Doctor of Philosophy from the University of KwaZulu-Natal.

== Career ==
Nyegenye was ordained as a deacon in 1997 and as a priest in 2000 in Bukedi Diocese. She began her career at St. John's Church of Uganda in Busia as an assistant vicar and later acting vicar between 1996 and 1998. Nyegenye then moved to Uganda Christian University, where she served as the chaplain's assistant in 2002 before being promoted to assistant chaplain in 2004. In September 2012, Nyegenye was appointed university chaplain.

On July 10, 2019, Nyegenye was installed as the first female provost in the history of the Church of Uganda. The installation ceremony took place at All Saints' Cathedral, Kampala, where she also served as chaplain. The archbishop of the Church of Uganda and the bishop of the Diocese of Kampala, Stanley Ntagali, officiated at the service.

In 2026, following a reorganisation of the Diocese of Kampala, Nyegenye was appointed dean of All Saints' Cathedral.

== Personal life ==
Nyegenye married Wilson Nyegenye in February 1990. They have three children: Ronald Peter Mukisa, Winfred Sarah Kwagala, and Priscilla Barbra Mirembe.

== See also ==
Diana Nkesiga
