= Lord's Resistance Army insurgency (1987–1994) =

- Part of the War in Uganda (1986–1994)
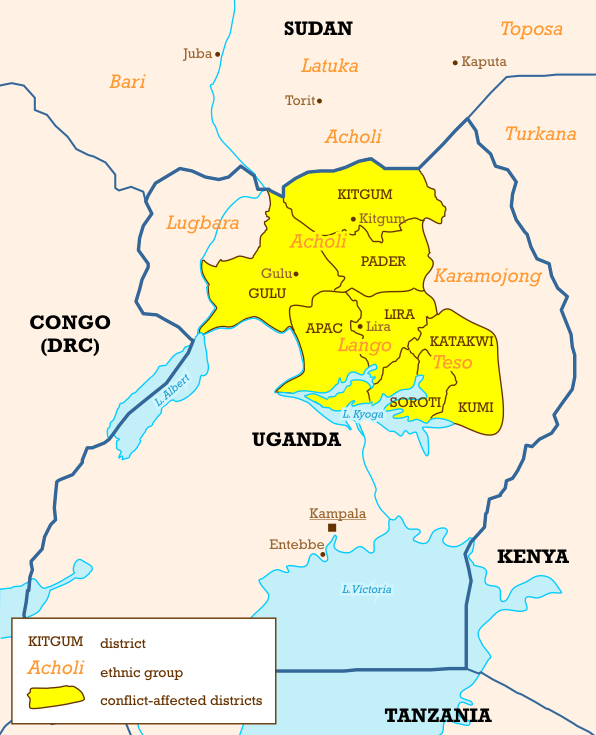
- Areas affected by the LRA insurgency
Date	1987–1994
Location	Primarily Acholiland, Uganda
Result	Peace talks fail, conflict intensifies

Belligerents
Uganda: National Resistance Army; Arrow Boys	Lord's Resistance Army

The period from 1986 to 1994 of the Lord's Resistance Army insurgency is the early history of the ongoing insurgency of the Lord's Resistance Army (LRA) rebel group in Uganda, which has been described as one of the most under-reported humanitarian crises in the world. The Lord's Resistance Army was formed in early 1987 out of the conflict following the successful rebellion of the National Resistance Army (NRA), though remained a relative small group through the counterinsurgency of the NRA. As the peace talks initiated by Minister Betty Bigombe failed Sudanese support to the LRA intensified the conflict.

== The origins of the LRA (January 1987 to June 1988) ==
In January 1987, Joseph Kony made his first appearance as a spirit medium. Few took notice as numerous mediums claiming to be the torchbearers of a holy war emerged after the initial success of the Holy Spirit Movement of Alice Auma. Throughout 1987, Kony gained military strength by absorbing small units of the rebel Uganda People's Democratic Army, and through violent competition with other Acholi rebel groups for resources and fighters. In late 1987, he agreed to join the UPDA in attacking Gulu Town; however, he then betrayed them by attacking the UPDA headquarters in retaliation for UPDA attempts to steal food being delivered by Kony’s supporters.

Around this time, Kony changed the name of his group to The Lord's Army, reflecting the increased importance he placed on the religious aspects of his insurgency. At the beginning of 1988, prominent ex-soldier Otunu Lukonyomoi joined the LRA. He was popular for his high moral standards for the conduct of LRA rebels, especially in their treatment of civilians. This resulted in a rivalry with Kony, but the two managed to reconcile before it led to a split in the organization.

In June 1988, when it became clear that the UPDA would sign a peace accord with the NRA, Kony wrote a letter to an NRA officer requesting a meeting, but was attacked before talks could be held, allegedly due to a miscommunication between NRA units. The NRA leadership also found the mysticism of the LRA to be baffling. The end result was that Kony's attempt to engage in talks with the government was never fully explored.

== A small domestic insurgency (June 1988 to March 1994) ==
The June 1988 peace accord between the UPDA and the NRA, as well as the defeat the year before of the Holy Spirit Movement, left the group led by Kony as the only significant rebel force operating in Acholiland. Former commander Odong Latek of the UPDA and some of his soldiers refused to accept the accord and joined the LRA. Latek gained a lot of influence in the organization, and convinced Kony to adopt conventional guerrilla tactics. Prior to this, LRA forces normally attacked in a cross-shaped formation with designated persons sprinkling holy water, much like the Holy Spirit Movement. Tactics since consist primarily of surprise attacks on civilian targets, such as villages. These attacks are carried out by highly mobile groups of 15 that split into groups of three to six to disperse after the attack.

The LRA will also occasionally carry out large-scale attacks to underline the inability of the government to protect the populace. The tactical changes were reflected in the adoption of yet another organizational name, the Uganda Peoples' Democratic Christian Army (UPDCA). In October 1988, the highly respected Otunu Lukonyomoi was killed in an NRA ambush, following which a number of rebels left to join the NRA. This greatly weakened the LRA's fighting strength.

In mid-1988, President Museveni created the position of "Minister of State for Pacification of Northern Uganda, Resident in Gulu." He assigned the post to the Acholi Betty Oyella Bigombe, who was tasked with convincing insurgents to abandon their struggle. Protests at the connotation of the word "pacification" led to the revision of the title to "Minister of State in the Office of the Prime Minister, Resident in Northern Uganda." Nevertheless, in late 1988 the LRA gave the NRA a number of defeats. Until 1991 the LRA continued to operate in small bands as a classic insurgency and raided the populace for supplies, which were carried away by villagers who were abducted for short periods. The fact that some units of NRA soldiers were known for their brutal actions ensured that the LRA were given at least passive support by segments of the Acholi population.

=== Operation North (1991 to 1992) ===
March 1991 saw the start of a massive government attempt to destroy the LRA, later known as "Operation North." The whole of Northern Uganda was locked down and all humanitarian organizations were forced to leave in preparation for counterinsurgency operations. Operation North combined efforts to destroy the combatants while cutting away its roots of support among the population through heavy-handed tactics, including arbitrary arrests, torture and extralegal executions. While Operation North was prompted partially by the activities of the LRA, the World Bank had approved a loan on 5 May 1992 for reconstruction of Northern infrastructure, which could not be implemented in an insecure environment.

As part of Operation North, Minister Bigombe created "Arrow Groups", mostly armed with bows and arrows, as a form of local community defence. As the LRA was armed with modern weaponry, the bow-and-arrow groups were overpowered. Nevertheless, the creation of the Arrow Groups angered Kony, who began to feel that he no longer had the support of the population. In response the LRA mutilated numerous Acholi who they believed to be government supporters, cutting off their hands, noses and ears, padlocking their mouths shut through holes cut in their lips, or simply hacking them to death with machetes.

Kony would later explain the reasons for these actions: "If you pick up an arrow against us and we ended up cutting off the hand you used, who is to blame? You report us with your mouth, and we cut off your lips? Who is to blame? It is you! The Bible says that if your hand, eye or mouth is at fault, it should be cut off." While the government efforts were a failure, the LRA reaction caused many Acholi to finally turn against the insurgency. However, this was tempered by the deep-seated antagonism towards the occupying government forces.

=== The Bigombe talks (1993 to 1994) ===
After the failure of Operation North, Minister Bigombe on her own accord initiated contact with Kony through an LRA sympathizer in June 1993. This led to the most promising diplomatic efforts of the first 18 years of the insurgency. Following Kony's reply that he would be willing to talk, Bigombe informed the military and President Yoweri Museveni, who approved further negotiations though he stated that military operations would continue.

In November 1993, the first face-to-face meeting between representatives of the LRA and government took place under an agreed cease-fire at Pagik in Gulu District. Bigombe represented the government and brought several Acholi elders as well as the commander of the Fourth Division, Col. Samuel Wasswa, who was responsible for military operations in the North, while the LRA sent members of Kony's inner circle. The LRA asked for a general amnesty for their combatants and stated that they would not surrender, but were willing to "return home." Bigombe reassured the LRA that they would not be treated as a vanquished foe, and Wasswa agreed to a cease-fire to allow the negotiations to continue.

However, several influential officers within the NRA felt that the government was caving in to rebel demands. Bigombe's superior, the Prime Minister, refused to support the peace process publicly or logistically, possibly because of a struggle over who would claim credit for a final peace deal. The ambiguous stance of the senior political leadership was also problematic. At a second meeting on 10 January 1994, Kony himself gave a four-hour speech in which he blamed the Acholis as "responsible for the war that had backfired with terrible results that everyone now blamed Kony for." In one-on-one talks with Bigombe, Kony asked for six months to regroup his troops.

=== The Bigombe talks collapse (February 1994) ===
This demand for six months was widely perceived as excessive. It was later revealed that the military had learned that Kony was negotiating with the Sudanese government for support while talking to Bigombe, and felt that Kony was simply trying to buy time. Regardless, the sight of LRA combatants traveling openly and peacefully had created an expectation among the Acholi that a final peace was at hand. However, by early February the tone of the negotiations was growing increasingly acrimonious. The LRA negotiating team felt that the NRA officers were acting arrogantly as victors accepting terms from a defeated foe, contrary to the understanding reached at the first meeting, and traded harsh words over the negotiating table.

Bigombe apparently also felt caught between her dual role as government representative and chief mediator, and believed that she was not receiving adequate support from the government as a whole. Following a meeting on 2 February, the LRA broke off negotiations stating that they felt that the NRA was trying to entrap them. Four days later, President Yoweri Museveni spoke to a crowd in Gulu and announced a seven-day deadline for the LRA to surrender; otherwise the government would pursue a military solution. Whatever the reason, and regardless of whether or not the LRA was negotiating in good faith, this ultimatum ended the Bigombe initiative.

== See also ==
- Lord's Resistance Army insurgency (1994–2002)
