= Alicia Vacas Moro =

Spanish nurse and nun

- Born: c.1972 Valladolid (Spain)
- Occupation: Nun in Bethany
- Known for: She was awarded the International Women of Courage Award in 2021

Alicia Vacas Moro (born c.1972) is a Spanish-born nurse and a leader of the Comboni Missionary Sisters in the Middle East and Asia. She served as a nurse in Egypt and in Bethany in the West Bank. During the pandemic she returned to help in Italy. She was awarded the International Women of Courage Award in 2021 on the recommendation of the Holy See for her work.

== Life ==
Vacas was born in Spain in about 1972. She studied to be a registered nurse and she used these skills in Egypt where she was treating 150 Bedouin patients a day.

In 2017 she was looking after elderly nuns in Verona. She had spent seven years in the Israel-Palestine, where she and the other nuns cared for Bedouins and asylum seekers, without regard to their belief. During the wars in Gaza in 2010 and 2014 Sr Alicia was part of a fact finding mission promoted by Physicians for Human Rights–Israel. She said that God was in the ruins and in her own weaknesses.

She was awarded the International Women of Courage Award in 2021 after being nominated by the Holy See. At the time she was working in Bethany in a Comboni convent where the house was surrounded on three sides by the wall that separates Israel from its neighbours. The convent had been founded in 1966 and at one time was in Jordanian territory (In 2019 the convent was registered in Amman as a small religious house with three religious living there. She was the Superior nun.).

In 2004 the second Palestinian uprising was taking place and the convent became unreachable by half of the people they care for. The convent is surrounded by blocks of concrete and barbed wire. Trees just disappeared as the wall came through their garden. The convent had run a kindergarten and for a time there was a small window in the wall so that parents could bring their children each day. The access door was blocked and the kindergarten lost most of its children as their parents needed to take two buses to bring and fetch their children. The playground has a fireproof roof to catch molotov cocktails and the playing children are looked over by the wall and its watch towers. The convent is so close to the wall that it is a handy landing point for Palestinians who are jumping over the wall. This makes the convent a place of disruption and it means that the children there get to see soldiers twice a day and Vacas regrets that this is the image the children have of Israelis.

Vacas travelled to northern Italy during the country's COVID-19 pandemic to administer help to sisters. Ten sisters died during the pandemic in a community of 55 elderly Comboni nuns in Bergamo. Usually, she leads the Comboni Missionaries for the Middle East and Asia.

The Woman of Courage award was presented in the company of Linda Thomas-Greenfield, the U.S. Ambassador to the United Nations, and the First Lady Jill Biden by the Secretary of State Antony Blinken on 8 March 2021. There were 14 awards. After the ceremony a "Virtual Watch Party" was scheduled hosted by the American Charge d'Affaires to the Holy See, Patrick Connell, and Sister Patricia Murray who was the executive secretary of the International Union of Superiors General.
