= Arrow Boys Monument =

- Obalanga Monument
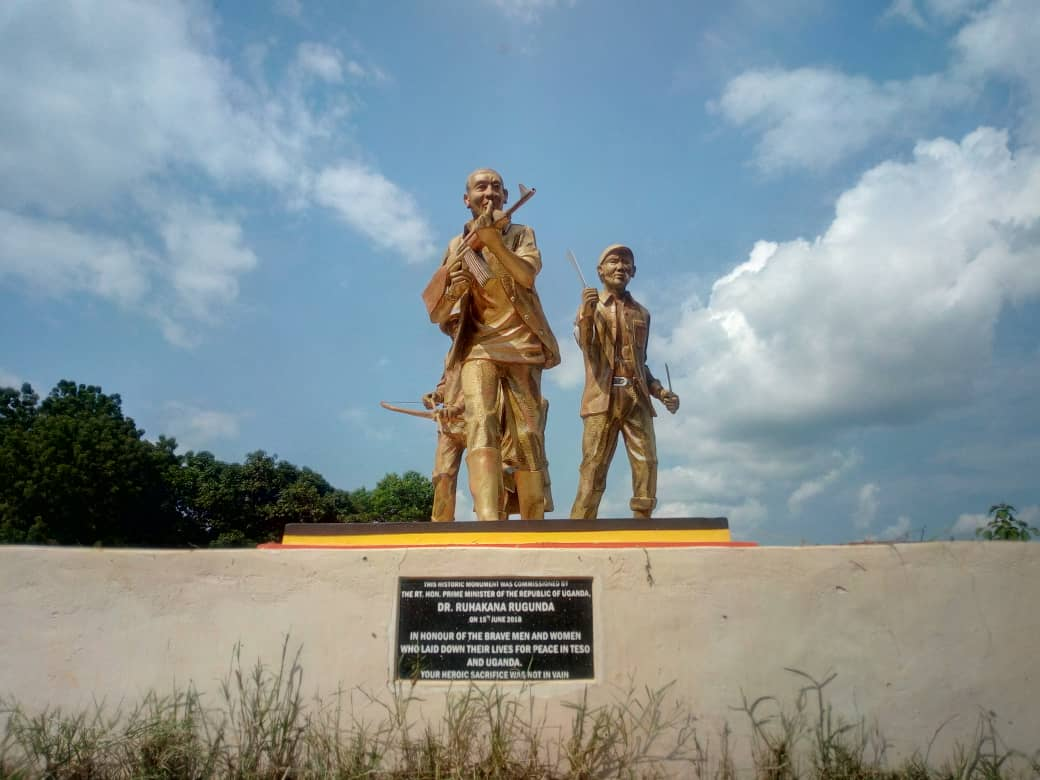
- Interactive map of Arrow Boys Monument
- Location: Kapelebyong District
- Coordinates: 2°12′10″N 33°35′31″E
- Dedicated to: The 365 victims of the 2003 Teso LRA attack

The Arrow Boys Monument, also known as the Obalanga Massacre Memorial and the Arrow Group Monument, is the largest mass grave in Uganda. Located in Obalanga County, Amuria, it contains the remains of the 265 victims of the 2003 Teso Lord's Resistance Army (LRA) attack. Since 2003, Teso leaders have organized annual memorial prayers on June 15 to remember the people who were killed in the attack.

== Location ==
The Arrow Boys Monument is located in Obalanga town council in Kapelebyong district, which was cut off from Amuria District in Eastern Uganda.

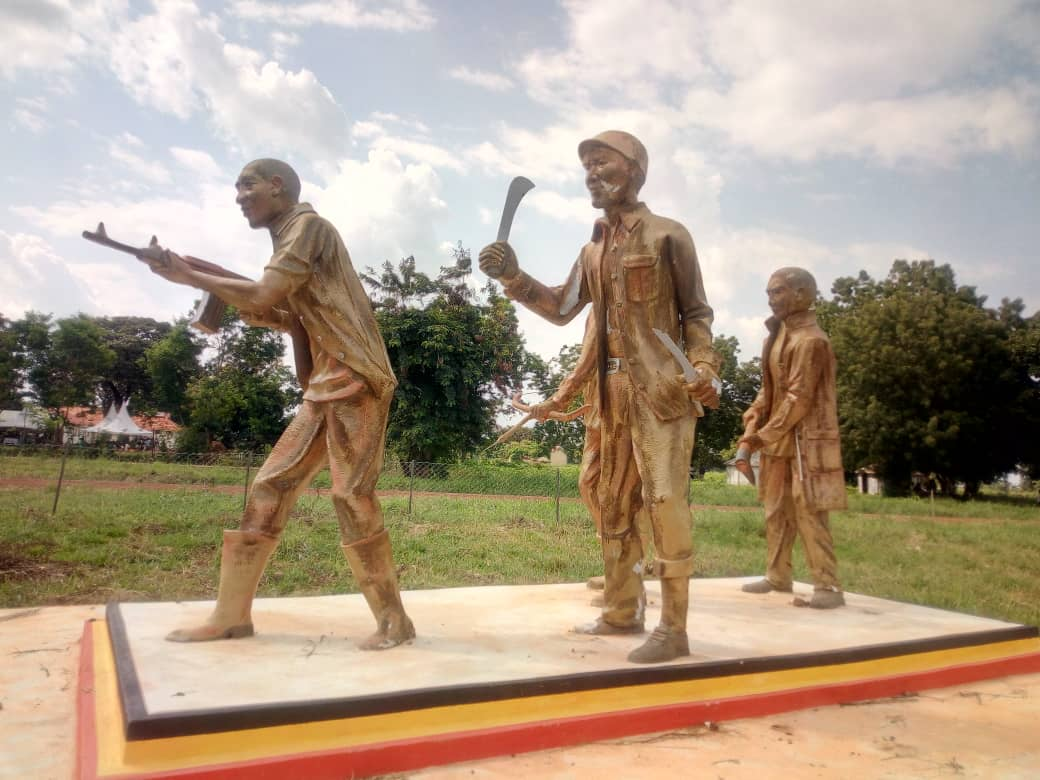
Arrow Boys Monument in Eastern Uganda-Kapelebyong district #WCU2024

== History ==
=== Background ===
The Arrow Boys were local militia who were mobilized by Teso leaders to drive out the LRA out of the region. They used rudimentary tools like axes, machetes, arrows and bows to defend themselves from the LRA attack.

The Arrow Boys were ex-soldiers of the Uganda People's Army (UPA) who had fought against the government in the late 1980s and early 1990s, and had been out of action for at least ten years. The ambushing of LRA led to their counterinsurgency.

Under the command of Ecweru Musa, the Arrows Boys killed 43 LRA commanders and rescued over 9,000 children captured by the LRA.

After the initial attack on 15 June 2003, Obalanga County was heavily affected by the LRA rebels' attack, and was used as the entry point by the LRA rebels in Teso. Many people were killed and others abducted including children, and also property destroyed. Up to 100,000 people were displaced into camps.

== See also ==
- List of National Cultural Sites in Eastern Region, Uganda
- Uganda martyrs shrine
- Joseph Kibwetere
- Aboke abductions
