= Carter Center =

American nonprofit organization

The Carter Center
- Founded: April 6, 1982; 44 years ago
- Founders: Jimmy Carter; Rosalynn Carter
- Type: Not-for-profit, non-governmental organization (IRS exemption status): 501(c)(3)
- Tax ID no.: 58-1454716
- Purpose: Human rights, Conflict resolution, Election monitoring, Public health, Eradication of infectious diseases, Mental health
- Location(s): One Copenhill; 453 Freedom Parkway; Atlanta, Georgia, US
- Region served: Global (75 countries since 1982)
- Method: Popular education, Access to information, Aid distribution
- Key people: Jimmy Carter, co-founder; Rosalynn Carter, co-founder; Paige Alexander, chief executive officer
- Employees: 175; field office staff in more than a dozen countries
- Website: cartercenter.org

The Carter Center is a nongovernmental, nonprofit organization founded in 1982 by former U.S. president Jimmy Carter. He and his wife Rosalynn Carter partnered with Emory University after his defeat in the 1980 United States presidential election. The center is located in a shared building adjacent to the Jimmy Carter Library and Museum on 37 acres (150,000 m^{2}) of parkland, on the site of the razed neighborhood of Copenhill, two miles (3 km) from downtown Atlanta, Georgia. The library and museum are owned and operated by the United States National Archives and Records Administration, while the center is governed by a Board of Trustees, consisting of business leaders, educators, former government officials, and philanthropists.

The Carter Center's goal is to advance human rights and alleviate human suffering. The center has projects across 80 countries including election monitoring, democratic institution-building, conflict mediation, and human rights advocacy. It also leads efforts to treat neglected tropical diseases, spearheading the campaign to eradicate dracunculiasis, as well as treating onchocerciasis, trachoma, lymphatic filariasis, and malaria.

In 2002, Jimmy Carter received the Nobel Peace Prize for his work "to find peaceful solutions to international conflicts, to advance democracy and human rights, and to promote economic and social development" through the Carter Center. In 2007, he wrote an autobiography entitled Beyond the White House: Waging Peace, Fighting Disease, Building Hope, which chronicles the first 25 years of The Carter Center.

== History ==
The center was founded in 1982 and dedicated in 1986 with William Foege as its executive director.

In 1993, John Hardman was appointed executive director, and during the 1990s the center received several multimillion-dollar donations to fight Guinea worm disease and to prevent blindness.

In 1994, the center launched an initiative called "Not Even One" to fight child death by firearm. They decided to expand the program on March 25, 1997, effective April 1 of the same year.

On October 2, 1995, The Rosalynn Carter Georgia Mental Health Forum was held at The Carter Center.

== Governance ==
The center is governed by a board of trustees, which oversees the organization's assets and property and promotes its objectives and goals. In November 2015, Jason Carter, grandson of Jimmy and Rosalynn Carter, became Chair of the board of trustees.

A community advisory group – the Board of Councilors – includes public and private-sector leaders who support The Carter Center and its activities in their communities and organizations. Members attend quarterly presentations on the center's work.

The CEO of The Carter Center is Paige Alexander, appointed on June 16, 2020. Her predecessor was (Ret.) Ambassador Mary Ann Peters who had served in the position since 2014.

Center-based councils of eminent persons who offer guidance to or participate in center activities include: the Council of Presidents and Prime Ministers of the Americas, the International Task Force for Disease Eradication, and the Mental Health Task Force. The Carter Center also collaborates with other public and private organizations.

== Peace programs ==
=== Observing elections ===
The Carter Center performs election monitoring, sending teams of observers to determine the legitimacy of 115 elections in 40 countries since 1989. Scholars of election monitoring consider the Carter Center to be a "high-quality" election monitor. The Carter Center played an important role in the Declaration of Principles for International Election Observers, which codifies rules of best practices for election monitors.

Carter Center observers analyze election laws, assess voter education and registration processes, and evaluate fairness in campaigns. The presence of impartial election observers deters interference or fraud in the voting process, and reassures voters that they can safely and secretly cast their ballots and that vote tabulation will be conducted without tampering.

Teams typically include 30–100 highly qualified impartial observers – regional leaders, political scientists, regional specialists, and election observation professionals.

The Carter Center sends observers only when invited by a country's electoral authorities and welcomed by the major political parties. Observers do not interfere in the electoral process and do not represent the U.S. government.

The center's endorsement of the electoral process in the 2004 Venezuelan recall referendum has been disputed by the Center for Security Policy. Fox News' Doug Schoen told Michael Barone of U.S. News & World Report, "Our internal sourcing tells us that there was fraud in the Venezuelan central commission. The Carter Center looked into the allegations and released a paper and statistical analysis reaffirming their original conclusions.

The center played a key role – with the U.N. Electoral Assistance Division and the National Democratic Institute – in building consensus on a common set of international principles for election observation. It is also leading the effort to develop effective methodologies for observing elections that employ new electronic voting technologies.

In the 2020 US election, the Carter Center observed parts of the process at home for the first time in the history of the United States. In this context, the center conducted information campaigns in advance to strengthen confidence in the election process. On November 13, 2020, the center announced that it would monitor the hand recount in Georgia to "help bolster transparency and confidence in election results.

=== Strengthening democracy beyond elections ===
The Carter Center supports the growth of democratic institutions to ensure that there is a respect for rule of law and human rights, that government decisions are open and transparent, and that everyone can have adequate resources to compete fairly for public office.

For example, the center is supporting the efforts of civic leaders in Ethiopia to convene discussions about the most pressing and contentious political and social issues facing the country, and in the Palestinian Territories, it maintains a small presence in Ramallah focused on the ongoing monitoring and analysis of critical issues of democratic development.

Democratic initiatives in Latin America include support for regional access-to-information programs, creation of an inter-American support network, and reform of political campaign financing. The center-based Council of Presidents and Prime Ministers of the Americas plays an important role in accomplishing these objectives.

The Carter Center also promotes the dissemination to emerging democracies and regional organizations of models, lessons, and best practices for democratic governance. The goal is to empower those in transitioning countries who are trying to build stronger democratic institutions and practices.

=== Advancing human rights ===
The Carter Center believes all people are entitled to basic human rights. These rights include political rights, such as peace, freedom, and self-governance, as well as the social rights of health care, food, shelter, and economic opportunity.

The center actively supports human rights defenders around the world. In partnership with Human Rights First and the U.N. High Commissioner for Human Rights, the Center holds an annual human rights defenders policy forum hosted by President Carter in Atlanta.

President and Mrs. Carter have intervened with heads of state on behalf of human rights defenders and victims for more than 20 years. They often take their human rights concerns to heads of state in personal meetings and through letters.

The center and President Carter are strong supporters of the U.N. Human Rights Council and the International Criminal Court. Both oppose the death penalty and urge its abolition in the U.S.

=== Mediating conflict ===
Recalling President Carter's success in the White House negotiating the long-lasting peace treaty between Israel and Egypt, groups in conflict turn to The Carter Center to help them prevent and resolve conflict. Lacking any official authority, the center has become a trusted broker for peace, serving as a channel for dialogue and negotiation.

Recent examples include:

- President Carter's mission to North Korea in 1994, which paved the way for a U.S.-North Korea pact on nuclear issues.
- Assisting unofficial Israeli and Palestinian negotiators in designing a model agreement for peace – called the Geneva Accord – in 2002 and 2003.
- Negotiation of the Nairobi Agreement in 1999 between Sudan and Uganda
- President Carter's mission to Haiti in 1994 with Senator Sam Nunn and the then former chairman of the Joint Chiefs of Staff General Colin Powell to avert a U.S.-led multinational invasion and restore to power Haiti's democratically elected president.
- President Carter's historic trip to Cuba in 2002 to seek improved U.S.-Cuban relations
- Negotiation of a cease-fire in 1995 in Sudan to allow humanitarian groups treat Guinea worm disease and river blindness and immunize children.
- Holding summits in Egypt and Tunisia in 1995 and 1996 to address violence in the Great Lakes region of Africa
- An agreement on the restoration of low-level diplomatic relations between Colombia and Ecuador under a deal brokered by the former president, as announced by the Carter Center on June 8, 2008.

=== Assisting China village elections ===
Since 1988, the Chinese government has authorized direct village elections to help maintain social and political order in the context of rapid economic reforms. At the invitation of China's Ministry of Foreign Affairs, The Carter Center initiated a joint project in 1998 to standardize Chinese village election procedures and assist in training of election officials and elected National People's Congress deputies. In 2011, the Carter Center decided to focus on advancing the US- China relationship, and since 2015 has been promoting greater Africa-U.S.-China cooperation.

== Health programs ==
The center has prevented the suffering of millions of people around the world from illnesses often ignored by others. Health programs seek to provide people with the information and access to services they need to treat their illnesses and take steps to prevent future spread of disease. An emphasis is placed on building partnerships for change among international agencies, governments, nongovernmental organizations, and corporations and on working with ministries of health to strengthen or establish permanent health care delivery systems in the poorest nations.

During his acceptance speech for the Nobel Peace Prize in 2002, Carter commented on what he felt is the greatest challenge the world faces:

"Among all the possible choices, I decided that the most serious and universal problem is the growing chasm between the richest and poorest people on earth. Citizens of the ten wealthiest countries are now 75 times richer than those who live in the ten poorest ones, and the separation is increasing every year, not only between nations but also within them. The results of this disparity are root causes of most of the world's unresolved problems, including starvation, illiteracy, environmental degradation, violent conflict and unnecessary illnesses that range from Guinea worm to HIV/AIDS. Tragically, in the industrialized world there is a terrible absence of understanding or concern about those who are enduring lives of despair and hopelessness. We have not yet made the commitment to share with others an appreciable part of our excessive wealth. This is a necessary and potentially rewarding burden that we should all be willing to assume."

=== Disease eradication efforts ===
The Carter Center began spearheading the campaign to eradicate Guinea worm disease worldwide in 1986. At the time, there were about 3.5 million annual cases of the disease in 20 countries in Africa and Asia. In 2023, there were 14 reported cases of Guinea worm disease, which remained endemic in five countries: Angola, Chad, Ethiopia, Mali, and South Sudan. Guinea worm disease is poised to be the first parasitic disease to be eradicated and the only disease to be eradicated without the use of vaccines or drugs.

Within affected countries, the center reinforces existing disease eradication programs by providing technical and financial assistance, as well as logistics and tools, such as donated filter cloth material, larvicide, and medical kits.

The International Task Force for Disease Eradication has been based at The Carter Center since its formation in 1988. The group has reviewed more than 100 infectious diseases and identified six as potentially eradicable – dracunculiasis, poliomyelitis, mumps, rubella, lymphatic filariasis, and cysticercosis.

=== Implementing disease control and treatment measures ===
Since 1996, the center has been a leader in the fight against onchocerciasis, commonly known as river blindness – a parasitic disease transmitted by the bites of black flies.

The center currently works to stop the spread of the disease in six countries: Brazil, Ethiopia, Nigeria, Sudan, Uganda, and Venezuela, helping residents and local health workers institute and sustain drug treatment programs and health education activities. The center contributed to the efforts that successfully eliminated river blindness transmission in Colombia, Ecuador, Guatemala, and Mexico.

The center has helped to distribute more than 500 million doses of Mectizan (ivermectin) – a drug donated by Merck & Co., Inc., that treats and prevents river blindness.

Center health workers also prevent transmission of trachoma – a bacterial infection that is the leading cause of preventable blindness worldwide. Trachoma is prevalent in places that lack the tools for basic hygiene, clean water, and adequate sanitation.

The Center follows the World Health Organization's four-pronged approach – called the SAFE strategy – to fight trachoma in six African countries. The Trachoma Control Program is working to improve sanitation in those communities by building latrines, providing corrective surgery, distributing antibiotics, and educating communities on basic hygiene.

As of March 2010, The Carter Center has helped to build more than one million latrines in its effort to fight trachoma.

The latrines contain human waste, preventing it from serving as a breeding ground for the disease-carrying flies, thereby reducing one way the disease is spread.

Lymphatic filariasis and malaria are mosquito-borne diseases also targeted by The Carter Center. The center has distributed four million long-lasting insecticidal bed nets. It has also established drug distribution systems in Nigeria to treat and stem the spread of lymphatic filariasis and schistosomiasis.

=== Training public health workers ===
The Carter Center believes in building networks of village-based health care workers to treat people for various diseases at the same time. Emphasis is on helping national and local governments establish programs that they can sustain into the future.

Since 1997, the center established with the Ethiopian ministries of health and education the Ethiopia Public Health Training Initiative to improve academic training for health care personnel in Ethiopia and increase access to health care in rural communities throughout the country.

=== Strengthening agricultural production ===
In partnership with the Sasakawa Africa Association, the center has worked since 1986 in 15 sub-Saharan African countries to teach 8–10 million small-scale farmers improved techniques that double or triple their crop yields.

The program promotes use of fertilizers and crop protection chemicals, soil fertility, and environmentally friendly agronomic methods of crop production. It also supports efforts to construct quality grain storage to sustain market prices for the farmer and ensure greater food security, establish farmers' associations, and use quality food crops such as high-protein maize.

=== Reducing stigma of mental illness ===
Rosalynn Carter led the center's efforts to fight stigma associated with mental illness. The center works to spread awareness about mental health issues, increase equity in mental health care, shape public policy, and advocate for the rights of people with mental illnesses.

In its Global Behavioral Health Initiative, the center partnered with the Liberian Ministries of Health and Education to create a program to train mental health clinicians to serve in communities within Liberia. Over 300 Liberians have completed the training to become credentialed mental health clinicians, and 140 of these clinicians specialize in child and adolescent care. The initiative has also explored the linkages between mental health and other global health issues, such as looking into the impact of mental health support on people with neglected tropical diseases.

The Carter Center works to inform public policy in Georgia to make behavioral health services accessible by helping implement and enforce parity laws, expanding school-based behavioral health services for youth, and increasing the availability of care for older adults with mental illness. In 2022, the Georgia General Assembly passed the Mental Health Parity Act in a unanimous vote, ensuring that insurance plans cover behavioral health equally to physical health.

Through the Rosalynn Carter Fellowship for Mental Health Journalism, the center supports and trains journalists from around the world to increase reporting on behavioral health issues and reduce discrimination against people with mental illnesses. To date, more than 250 journalists have participated in the program.

Building on its journalism fellowship program, the center launched its Mental Health Parity Newsroom Collaborative in 2022, to investigate coverage of mental health care and reduce inequities in the U.S. In 2024, the cohort included more than 40 reporters and editors from over 15 news outlets.

For the past 32 years, the center has held an annual symposium on mental health policy with national leaders in mental health and other fields.

== Accolades ==
Jimmy Carter received the Nobel Peace Prize in 2002 for his work through the Carter Center. The Carter Center received the inaugural Delta Prize for Global Understanding in 1999—an award administered by the University of Georgia.

In 2006, the Bill & Melinda Gates Foundation presented the Carter Center with the Gates Award for Global Health.

The center was awarded Hamdan Award for Volunteers in Humanitarian Medical Services for 2013–14.

=== Annual weekend ===
Since 1992, the Carter Center has organized an annual weekend. In 2019, for the first time, part of the event program was opened to the media, a discussion on human rights. An important part of the event is an auction that raised $1.6 million in 2013 and $4 million in 2018.

== Funding ==
In the 2022-2023 fiscal year, the Carter Center received $380 million, including "cash, pledges, and in-kind gifts" with 71% of revenue coming from corporations.

== Criticism ==
In 2007, Alan Dershowitz, an American attorney, alleged on a pro-Israel website that the center's focus "is away from significant Arab abuses and on Israel's far less serious ones" and that this is influenced by the center's receipt of donations from Arab sources. One of the initial contributors to the center was Bank of Commerce and Credit International founder Agha Hasan Abedi, who donated $500,000. Abedi and BCCI also donated $8 million to Carter's Global 2000 project.

According to the center, which discloses all donations over $1,000, 2.5 percent of the total amount of contributions it has received since its founding in 1982 thru 2016 were from donors in Middle East Arab nations.

Of the donations from the Middle East, the center stated that:

"83% of those funds have helped to support health programs in Africa, 9.8% have gone to the center's endowment, 2.7% were for original construction of buildings at our headquarters in Atlanta, Georgia, and 4.5% for projects to directly promote peace, such as specific election observations."

== See also ==
- Palestine: Peace Not Apartheid
