= Nairobi Agreement, 1999 =

The 1999 Nairobi Agreement was a deal signed by Presidents Yoweri Museveni of Uganda and Omar al-Bashir of Sudan in Nairobi, Kenya, on 8 December 1999. The stated intent of the agreement was to "provide the critical impetus for resolving the northern Uganda conflict." The deal was brokered by former US president Jimmy Carter.

== Conditions ==
Representatives from the Government of Uganda and the Government of Sudan met at The Carter Center in Atlanta July 17-19 to assess progress toward implementing the December 1999 Nairobi Agreement calling for the restoration of diplomatic relations between their two countries.

The governments of Uganda and Sudan agreed to respect each other's territorial integrity, renounce use of force in settling differences, return prisoners of war from respective countries and generally work to disarming rebel groups within their own territory and refusing support towards rebel groups operating in each other's territory. When the Nairobi Agreement was signed, there was real expectation that the accord would provide the critical impetus for resolving the northern Uganda conflict.
