= Negroland =

Historical region in Africa

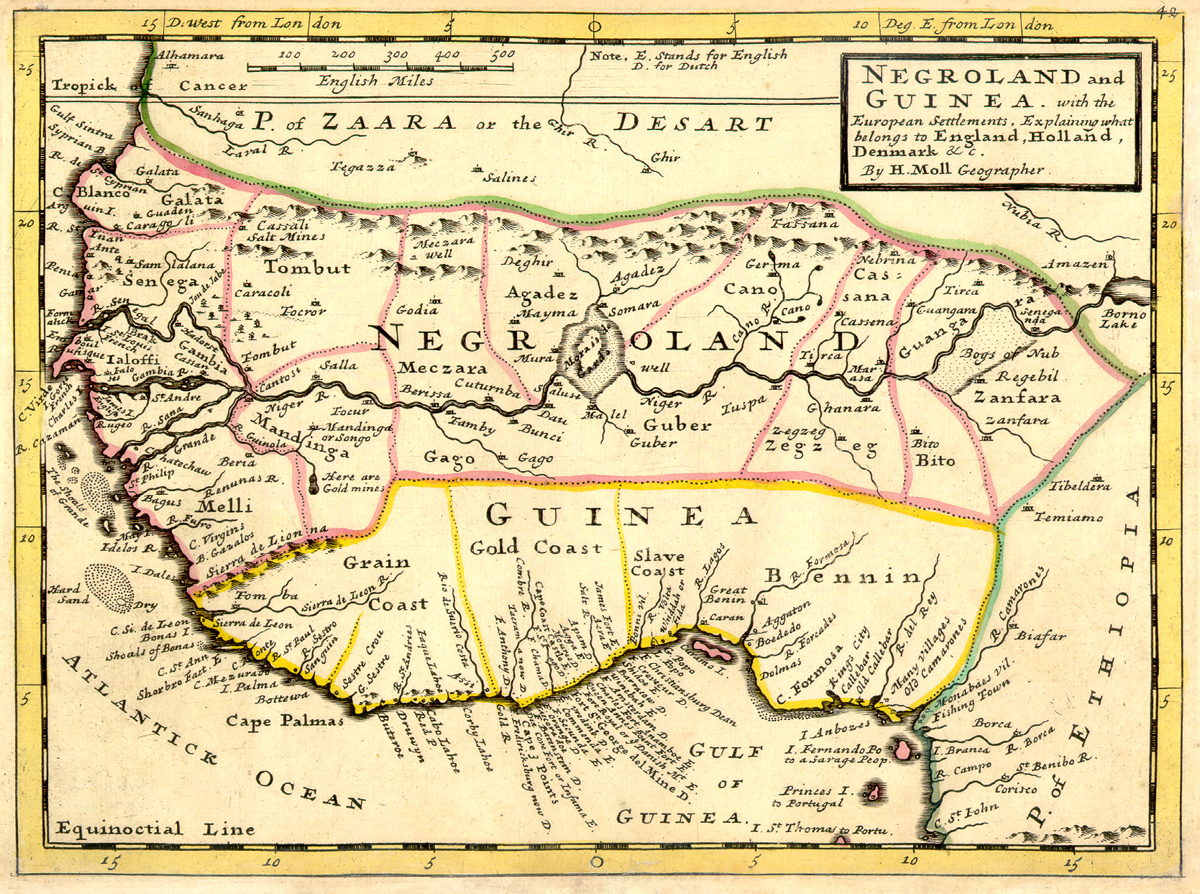
A 1729 map titled: "NEGROLAND and GUINEA, with the European settlements. Explaining what belongs to England, Holland, Denmark & c. By H. Moll Geographer"

Negroland, Nigrita, or Nigritia, is an archaic term in European mapping, referring to Europeans' descriptions of West Africa as an area populated with negroes.

This area comprised at least the western part of the region called Sudan (not to be confused with the modern country). The term is probably a direct translation of the Arabic term Bilad as-Sudan (بلاد السودان), meaning "Land of the Blacks", corresponding to about the same area. There were various kinds of people in the area. The Persians called these areas Zangistān (زنگستان), meaning "Land of the Blacks" and the name Zang for black still remains in the name of Zanzibar (from Persian زنگبار (Zangibār) meaning "The Coast of Blacks". The name was given by Persian navigators when they visited the area in the middle ages. Some of the greatest states of those considered part of Negroland were the Bornu Empire and the Sokoto Caliphate.

"Negroland" represented the area between the region of Guinea and "Sahara" or "The Desert", the Sahara Desert. The name "Sahara" is derived from the Arabic word for "desert" in the feminine irregular form, the singular ṣaḥra' (صحراء /ˈsˤaħra/), plural ṣaḥārā (صَحَارَى /ˈsˤaħaːraː/), ṣaḥār (صَحَار), ṣaḥrāwāt (صَحْارَاوَات), ṣaḥāriy (صَحَارِي). "Guinea", not to be confused with the modern country, then referred to the south-facing coast of West Africa and the land stretching upriver from there. Herman Moll's 1727 map labels these "Grain Coast", "Slave Coast", and "Gold Coast". "Negroland" was the territory to the north of this, along the east–west axis of the Niger River, and the west-facing coast. Moll's map labels Gambia, Senegal, Mandinga and many other territories.

In 1823, approximately the same area was described as "Nigritia" on an American map published by Fielding Lucas Jr.

== See also ==
- Sahel

== Sources ==
- Encyclopædia Britannica 10th Edition (1902) Online - States of Central Africa
