= Aboke abductions =

Kidnapping of female students in Uganda

The Aboke abductions were the kidnapping of 139 secondary school female students from St. Mary's College Secondary school by rebels of the Lord's Resistance Army (LRA) on 10 October 1996, in Aboke, Kole District (then part of Apac District), Uganda. The deputy head mistress of the college, Sister Rachele Fassera of Italy, pursued the rebels and successfully negotiated the release of 109 of the girls. The Aboke abductions and Fassera's dramatic actions drew international attention, unprecedented at that time, to the insurgency in northern Uganda. A book titled "Aboke Girls" was written by Els De Temmerman about the abductions and effects of the abductions.

Aboke Girls Memorial aka Aboke Girls Monument was constructed in remembrance of the 139 girls who were abducted and killed by the Lord's Resistance Army (LRA), others were forced to become soldiers, sex slaves, wives for the LRA soldiers. The monument is located near Lira District headquarters.

== Background ==
Kole District is located just south of Acholiland, the region of Uganda most affected by the insurgency

Following the rise to power in January 1986 of President Yoweri Museveni after the victory of his rebel National Resistance Army, the north of Uganda was wracked by conflict as first the rebel Uganda People's Democratic Army and then the chiliastic Holy Spirit Movement struggled against the new rulers. In January 1987, another rebel group, the LRA, was started by the spirit-medium Joseph Kony, eventually becoming the sole surviving rebel force.

Despite attempts by the government to destroy or co-opt the LRA, it remained a weak but threatening force in the northern bush. In early 1994, the character of the LRA changed after it began to be supplied by the government of Sudan. The rebels began to target civilians, mutilating those they thought to be government sympathisers and abducting children as child soldiers and sex slaves.

Most LRA activities at this time were concentrated within the three districts then comprising Acholiland: Gulu, Pader, and Kitgum. The violence, however, sometimes reached into Apac District, which bordered Gulu and Pader to the south. On 21 March 1989, the LRA carried out a raid on St. Mary's College Aboki Girls school, a Combonian school for girls mainly between the ages of 13 and 16. The rebels had abducted 10 schoolgirls and 33 seminarians and villagers, as well as killing others whom they had run across. In that incident, deputy headmistress Rachele Fassera had tried to follow the rebels but had been forced to turn back after a battle erupted between the LRA force and a patrol of the government Uganda People's Defence Force (UPDF). Nine of the ten girls eventually escaped, while one was killed in a battle several years later. As a result, a UPDF unit was assigned to protect the college.

By 1996, the security situation had again worsened. The soldiers of the UPDF had been replaced by Local Defense Unit militia. Rumors began to circulate through the countryside that the LRA was beginning to look at St. Mary's College as a likely target again. Nevertheless, in September 1996, the LDU militia stated that they must move from the college 16 kilometres (9.9 mi) away to the town of Ikeme. Sister Alba, the mother superior, sent Sister Rachele to negotiate with the LDU commanding officer, who agreed to set up a night patrol if a pickup ferried the soldiers to the college at night and back to Ikeme at dawn.

The LRA almost always attacked at night, so this was a key breakthrough. Nineteen soldiers were assigned to the protection of the college, but Alba, feeling that the military presence was insufficient to stop an attack, sent Fassera by bike to ask for 50 soldiers, stating that she would otherwise close the school. Fassera did not have a way to transport the soldiers she was requesting, and the LDU officer calmed her by saying that he would send word if there was any danger.

== Abductions ==
By 8:15 pm on 9 October 1996, Ugandan Independence Day, the expected soldiers had not yet arrived at the school. The three sisters held a meeting to decide on a plan of action. The option of moving the girls out of the school and dispersing them was discussed, but it was already dark and the possibility that LRA rebels would be waiting outside to attack deterred the sisters from this course. An hour later, the girls went to bed, although the mother superior stayed up until 11:30 pm to pray in the chapel. At 2:30 am, the night watchman at the college knocked on Sister Fassera's door stating: "Sister, the rebels are here."

Sister Fassera immediately woke Sister Alba and then moved out of the convent towards the front gate, which was actually a net, of the compound and spotted the rebels outside the gate. Thinking that the rebels had been slowed by the gate and that they may be able to evacuate the girls through the back gate, the nuns moved back towards the four dormitories, each of which had about 50 students. As they drew closer, however, they saw flashlights around the dormitories and realized that the LRA had already come through the back gate.

In the knowledge that, if caught, the rebels would force them to open the doors, Sisters Alba and Fassera woke the one older nun, Sister Matilde, and together hid in the compound's stock house. Through the night, they heard the sounds of rebels moving through the compound but never the voice of any of the girls, giving them hope that the rebels had been kept out of the dorms by the iron reinforced doors and windows. Later estimates put the number of armed rebels at about 200. They burned the school vehicle, ransacked the clinic, and unsuccessfully attempted to burn several buildings.

As dawn approached, the nuns heard the sounds of the rebels leaving. At first light (approximately 6:30 am), Sister Alba sighted a small group of girls wandering in the open. When asked if they were okay, Claudia, a girl in the Senior Two (the equivalent of eighth grade in the United States or Canada – students are typically age 13–14), stated that the other girls had been taken away. The sisters rushed to the dormitories for Senior Four, Five, and Six. However, the girls inside, believing that the rebels had captured the nuns, refused to open the doors. Eventually the students were persuaded out. They reported to the sisters that the rebels had abducted Senior One, Two, and Three classes. One dormitory window had been broken and another's wall demolished. One hundred fifty-two secondary school girls between 13 and 16 years of age had been taken. At the time, none of the sisters were able to perform an accurate count.

== Pursuit ==
Fassera immediately volunteered to go after the girls and Sr. Alba agreed. Fassera changed clothes and took some money from the office to buy the girls' freedom when two male teachers, Bosco and Tom, came in and volunteered to accompany her in the pursuit. Fassera agreed to take the younger of the two, Bosco, and was about to leave when she was stopped by a 13-year-old student who had been raped. Leaving the child with Sr. Alba, Sr. Rachele and Bosco left the college at about 7 am. The rebels had looted a large amount of candy and drinks that the college had bought for the Independence Day celebrations and the pursuers found that they could follow a trail of candy wrappers and drink bottles across the bush.

They eventually came across a man who was fleeing the group of LRA, but who confirmed they had a group of girls with them. LRA bands were known to plant anti-personnel mines on their back trail to discourage pursuit and Bosco soon took the lead, telling Fassera to only step into his footprints. After wading through a swamp, Fassera and Bosco were joined by a woman whose daughter had also been abducted by the passing band. Soon after, as they came over a ridge, they saw the band on the ridge ahead. Coming through the valley, the three emerged from some dense brush to find themselves facing the leveled rifles of 30 rebels arrayed in two lines.

Sister Rachele was depending on two factors: she was White and a nun. The former might lead the rebels to treat her with more caution than they would another Ugandan, while the second was a position of respect in a religious country when dealing with a group that was led by a mystic. Fassera had spent a year and a half in Gulu and knew enough of the Acholi language to begin speaking with the man who identified himself as the leader of the LRA band. The leader, Mariano Ocaya, stated that he did not want the money she had brought, but in response to her request that he release the girls, to her astonishment, replied "Do not worry. I will give you the girls."

The leader ordered the woman who had joined Bosco and Fassera to leave and the pursuers and the LRA rebels then continued up the ridge, Fassera stayed close to Ocaya in the knowledge that only he could release the girls. They caught up with the girls and continued walking with the rebels and their abductees, both the students and other abductees that the rebels had taken before the band made camp near the railroad at Acokara.

Ocaya told Fassera to separate the St. Mary's College girls from the other captives and warned her against trying to add the other captives from her group. Fassera began to think that she would actually get all the girls back, but at that moment a UPDF helicopter gunship passed overhead, forcing everyone to scatter and hide in the brush and Ocaya ordered everyone to move again. Crossing the railroad tracks, the group came under fire from UPDF soldiers and everyone scrambled for cover. For four hours, the group continued on a forced march, periodically hiding from the gunship searching the area, as a rearguard of rebels slowed the UPDF soldiers.

The group, apparently losing the UPDF, arrived in a camp where there were still more abductees and the St. Mary's College girls were again separated from the others. One of Ocaya's "wives" took Fassera behind a hut to bathe and they had an argument when Fassera refused to change out of her habit into a dress. When she returned, Bosco whispered some of the girls were not being released. Fassera asked Ocaya if he was releasing the girls and he shook his head, wrote "139" in the dirt with a stick and said that he was releasing 109 and keeping 30, having selected them for desirable traits while Fassera was absent.

When Fassera protested, Ocaya said that she could write a letter to Joseph Kony with the names of the girls and he might agree to release them. Taking a piece of paper, Fassera went back to the girls, she found that the 30 had already been separated. When she approached, the 30 began calling out to her to save them and, at an order from Ocaya, nearby soldiers began beating and kicking the girls. When they again fell silent, Ocaya again ordered Fassera to write down their names.

As she came close, the girls again asked her to help, telling her that they would be raped if they stayed until nightfall. Again, Fassera asked Ocaya to release the 30 as well, but he replied that either 30 would stay or all would. One of the girls named Angela offered to write the names, as Ocaya insisted that Fassera join him and the other LRA commanders for tea and cookies. When she returned, Angela whispered that a girl named Janet had slipped into the 109. Fassera knew that Ocaya was thoroughly capable of ordering all 139 to stay if he found Fassera trying to sneak one of the 30 out, so she went to Janet and told her that she was endangering the entire group. Janet apologized and rejoined the 30. After telling Judith, the head girl of the class, to look after the other 29, Fassera and Bosco took the 109 and eventually found their way back to the college.

== Aftermath ==
Five of the thirty girls died in captivity and of the remainder, all but two eventually made their escape by 2006. Soon after the abduction, a girl named Jennifer went missing. When she was found hiding in a hut, the rebels dragged her into the open and ordered the others to beat her to death. The girls hit her lightly at first, but then the rebels surrounded the group and beat anyone who was not hitting Jennifer hard. Afterwards the LRA rebels left the corpse in the open and beat those who wept, both as a lesson about attempting to escape and as a way to break the social ties between the girls.

Of the fates of the thirty, the death of Judith, the head girl, is notable for its brutality. It is Sr. Rachele's belief that her request of Judith that she look after the others led her to do something that annoyed the rebels. One evening, Judith and another girl from the group of other captives, Caterina, had their hands bound behind their backs and were attacked with sticks, bicycle chains and machetes. Caterina died of her wounds the following morning, but Judith was still alive 24 hours later and asked for water. The rebels instead dragged her into the forest and tied her to a tree. A group of captives gathering firewood found her body a week later but the body had not started decomposing, indicating that she had not been dead for long. After a week of walking, the girls were brought north to Kony's base in Southern Sudan where they were given to various commanders as "wives".

Sr. Rachele and the parents of the remaining abducted children formed the Concerned Parents Association (CPA) to raise awareness of the abductions and work for the children to be returned. In the course of their advocacy, the tale of the Aboke girls became one of the most widely known horror stories of the entire conflict. The CPA appealed to Pope John Paul II, who condemned the abductions, therefore drawing international attention to the incident and the situation in northern Uganda in general.

On 7 March 1997, President Museveni wrote to United Nations Secretary General Kofi Annan describing the plight of the Aboke girls. In June 1997, Sr. Rachele and members of the CPA met with LRA commanders in Juba, Sudan. After originally denying that they held the girls, they then said they would release them if the Ugandan military declared a ceasefire. The Ugandan government rejected the proposal and stated that they were not responsible for anything that may happen to the girls.

One of the most active CPA members has been Angelina Atyam, mother of Aboke girl Charlotte. Sr. Rachele and Ms. Atyam have, between the two of them, met the UN Special representative for children and armed conflicts, Olara Otunnu, then-U.S. First Lady Hillary Clinton, Kofi Annan, Yoweri Museveni, the Pope, members of the European Parliament, former South African President Nelson Mandela, Libyan President Muammar al-Gaddafi, Sudanese President Omar al-Bashir, and Zimbabwean President Robert Mugabe, as well as numerous diplomats of other nations.

The leaders of the LRA were indicted in 2005 for war crimes and crimes against humanity by the International Criminal Court, although some have noted that the indictments complicated the sporadic attempts at negotiations. A 2006 study estimated that 66,000 children and youths had been abducted over the course of the 20-year conflict.

On 14 March 2009, Catherine Ajok, one of the abducted Aboke girls still held by the rebels, returned to Uganda. Ajok escaped during the Garamba offensive against the LRA, making her way to a UPDF base in Dungu, Democratic Republic of the Congo. She returned with her 12-month-old baby, who she said was fathered by Joseph Kony.

In 2012, one of the 30 girls called Angela Atim Lakor escaped from the LRA soldiers. She later co-founded the Watye Ki Gen (we have hope) and organisation that supports both the returnees from the LRA rebels and their children to catch up with the stigma with the help of World Vision Children of War Reintegration Centre in Gulu.

Concerned Parents Association (CPA) was formed. It is that unites the parents of the abducted children.

== Chaipersons of the Concerned Parents Association (CPA) ==
- Angelina Atyam
- Late Ben Pere

== Controversies ==
In February 2001 during the presidential campaigns, Yoweri Museveni was reported to have said that Aboke girls should no longer be an issue as they were already affected by HIV/AIDS while he was speaking over Radio Rhino FM in Lira. Angelina Atyam also said that they (parents of the abducted children) had forgiven the rebels and also that they needed their girls back home whether they are sick or not, child mothers or child slaves.

== In popular culture ==
Susan Minot's 2014 novel, Thirty Girls, was inspired by the Aboke abductions.

== See also ==
- List of kidnappings
- List of solved missing person cases
- Arrow boys monument

== Bibliography ==
- Thonden, CRP (September 1997). Scars of Death: Children Abducted by the Lord's Resistance Army in Uganda. Human Rights Watch (Report).
- De Temmerman, E. Aboke Girls: Children Abducted in Northern Uganda, Fountain, 2001. ISBN 9970-02-256-3. (Originally published as De Temmerman, E. De meisjes van Aboke: Kindsoldaten in Noord-Oeganda. De Kern, 2000. ISBN 90-5312-146-3.)
- Thernstrom, Melanie (May 8, 2005), "Charlotte, Grace, Janet and Caroline Come Home", The New York Times
- Testimony of former child soldier Grace Grall Akallo (PDF), U.S. House Subcommittee on Africa, Global Human Rights and International Operations, 26 April 2006
- Brenna, Paulo, Sister, The Rebels Are Here (PDF)
