= Aboke =

Place in Uganda

- Municipality
- Location in Uganda
- Coordinates: 02°21′28″N 32°40′59″E
- Country: Uganda
- Region: Northern Region of Uganda
- Sub-region: Lango sub-region
- District: Kole District
- Elevation: 3,419 ft (1,042 m)

Population (2024 Census)
  - Total: 29,469

Aboke is a town in the Kole District of the Northern Region of Uganda. It was the location of the Aboke abductions in October 1996.

== Location ==
Aboke is located in Akwiridid Parish, Aboke sub-county, Kole District, in the Lango sub-region, in Northern Uganda. It is approximately 29 kilometres (18 mi), by road, north-west of the city of Lira, the largest urban centre in the sub-region. This is approximately 73 kilometres (45 mi), by road, southeast of the city of Gulu, the largest urban centre in Northern Uganda. The geographical coordinates of Aboke are:02°21'28.0"N, 32°40'59.0"E (Latitude:2.357778; Longitude:32.683056). Aboke sits at an average elevation of 1,042 metres (3,419 ft) above sea level.

== Overview ==
Aboke lies on the old Lira-Gulu Road, just north of the Okole River. The town is the location of the five-parish Aboke sub-county. The parishes in Aboke sub-county are: (a) Akwiridid (b) Apach (c) Apuru (d) Ogwangacuma and (e) Opeta.

The town is also the location of St. Mary's College Aboke Girls School, a residential girls-only secondary school administered by Italian nuns. It is at this school that the Aboke abductions occurred on the early morning of 10 October 1996.

== Abductions ==
The Lord's Resistance Army (LRA), the rebel group which started in January 1987 by Joseph Kony, began as a liberation group aimed at removing the National Resistance Movement led by Yoweri Museveni from power.

In the early 1990s the LRA began to receive support and supplies from the government of Sudan at that time. The character of the LRA changed. The rebels began to target civilians, mutilating those they thought to be government sympathisers and abducting children as child soldiers and sex slaves.

In the early morning hours of 10 October 1996, an estimated 300 rebels of the LRA invaded St Mary’s College Secondary School Aboke and abducted 139 young girls aged 13 to 16 years of age. Sister Rachele Frassera, an Italian nun and deputy headmistress at the school, followed the rebels and negotiated the release of 109 girls. They kept the other 30 as sex slaves for their commanders.

Four of the girls died in captivity while the remaining 26 eventually returned to their families in Uganda. Many had babies fathered by the rebels, including Kony. Catherine Ajok escaped on 14 December 2008, when the Uganda People's Defence Force bombed the LRA base in Garamba National Park, DR Congo. She arrived at their base in Dungu in March 2009.

== See also ==
- Langi people
- List of cities and towns in Uganda
- List of roads in Uganda
