= Moses Ddiba Ssentongo =

Ugandan Military Officer

- Born: Uganda
- Citizenship: Uganda
- Occupation: Military officer
- Years active: 1995 – present
- Known for: Military matters
- Title: Deputy director general National Enterprise Corporation

Major General Moses Ddiba Ssentongo is a military officer in the Uganda People's Defence Force (UPDF). He is one of two deputy director generals of the National Enterprise Corporation (NEC), the investment vehicle of the UPDF. He was appointed to that position in March 2016. Before that, from June 2013 until June 2014, he served as the chairman of the UPDF General Court Martial, one of the highest military courts in the UPDF. Before that, Ssentongo served as the political commissar of the UPDF. He replaced Fred Tolit, who was appointed as Uganda’s Defense Attaché to the headquarters of the African Union in Addis Ababa, Ethiopia.

== Military career ==
He has also served as the chief of education and sports in the UPDF.

During his tenure, as chairman of the General Court Martial of the UPDF, the court martial handled a number of important cases including:

1. The trial of Michael Ondoga, the former commander of the Ugandan contingent to AMISOM in Somalia. The trial was still ongoing as of June 2014.
2. The sentencing of four men, gun smugglers, who shot and killed Annick Van De Venster, a female Belgian tourist, whose campfire they mistook for a park ranger's. Fred Kipsang, the triggerman, was sentenced to 30 years in prison. His accomplices, Moses Chemtai, Patrick Chebles, and Kamada Chepkurui, were each given ten years behind bars.
3. The ongoing corruption and embezzlement trial of Shaban Bantariza, a former UPDF spokesperson and one-time Director of the National Leadership Institute (NALI), based in Kyankwanzi, Kyankwanzi District, Central Uganda.
4. The ongoing trial of Hassan Kimbowa, former commanding officer of Battle Group XI in the Ugandan AMISOM contingent to Somalia. He and Benson Olanya, a member of the same military unit, are accused of selling military fuel to Somali citizens, contrary to standing orders.

In his current assignment as deputy director general of the NEC, he reports directly to the director general of the NEC, James Mugira.

On 28 March 2020, he was promoted from the rank of Brigadier to that of Major General.

== See also ==
- Wilson Mbadi
- David Muhoozi
- Leopold Kyanda
- Fred Tolit
