= Peter Onzia Chandia =

Ugandan armed forces officer

- Born: Madi-Okollo, West Nile, Uganda
- Education: School of Infantry, Jinja; Armoured Warfare Training School, Kalama; Senior Command and Staff College, Kimaka; National Defence College Uganda
- Military career
- Allegiance: Uganda
- Branch: Uganda People's Defence Force
- Rank: Brigadier General
- Units: Armoured Corps; Ugandan Special Forces Command: Acting Commander, Special Forces Command (2021–2022); Commandant, Armoured Warfare Training School (2023–present)

Peter Onzia Chandia also known as Peter Candia is a senior officer in the Uganda People's Defence Force (UPDF) who serves as the Commandant of the Kalama Armoured Warfare Training School (KAWATS) in Kabamba, Mubende District, Uganda.

== Education background ==
Chandia completed his Officer Cadet Course at the School of Infantry, Jinja, in 1999. In the same year, he also undertook the Protective Operations, Defensive Marksmanship and Tactical Shooting Training Course. He later pursued armoured warfare training, beginning with the Tank Crew Course at the Armoured Warfare Training School, Kalama, in 2000.

He continued his armoured warfare training at the Armoured Warfare Training School, Kalama, completing the Tank Platoon Command Course in 2001, the Tank Company Command Course in 2002, and the Tank Battalion Command Course in 2003. In 2006, he attended the Instructors Certification Course at Luweero Industries.

Chandia further enhanced his leadership and security training by attending VIP Protection Training conducted by the South African Police Service (SAPS) in 2007, the Training of Trainers Course and Political Education and Leadership Development Course at the National Leadership Institute, Kyankwanzi, in 2008.

He later attended the Senior Command and Staff College, Kimaka, from 2013 to 2014, the Multinational Force Headquarters Command and Staff Training Course in Kenya in 2015, and the Military Security of the State Course in Russia from 2015 to 2017. In 2022, Chandia joined the National Defence College Uganda (NDC-U), where he undertook the National Security and Strategic Studies Course, graduating in 2023.

== Career ==
Chandia began his military career in the Uganda People's Defence Force (UPDF) after completing the Officer Cadet Course at the School of Infantry, Jinja, in 1999. From 1999 to 2014, he served in various armoured formations of the UPDF, holding positions including Tank Platoon Commander, Tank Squadron Commander, Tank Battalion Procurement Officer, Tank Battalion Maintenance Officer, Tank Battalion Operations and Training Officer, and Tank Battalion Commanding Officer.

In 2014, he was appointed as the Director for Strategy and Plans in the Special Forces Command (SFC), a position he held before becoming Deputy Commander of the Special Forces Command and served as Deputy Commander of the SFC until 2021.

In the same year, he was appointed as the Acting Commander of the Special Forces Command, serving in that role until January 2022 following the appointment of Lt. Gen. Muhoozi Kainerugaba as Commander of the UPDF Land Forces and in 2023, he was appointed as Commandant of the Armoured Warfare Training School (AWTS), Kalama, Mubende District.

== See also ==
- Charles Angina
- Edith Nakalema
- Wilson Mbadi
