= Clovis Kalyebara =

Ugandan brigadier

- Born: Uganda
- Died: May 14, 2013 (aged 57); Nairobi, Kenya
- Citizenship: Uganda
- Occupation: Military Officer
- Years active: 1979 – 2013
- Known for: Military Matters

Brigadier Clovis Kalyebara (1954–2013) was a senior army officer. He was Uganda's Military Attaché at the country's High Commission in Nairobi, Kenya, at the time of his death in May 2013. Prior to his posting to Nairobi, in February 2013, Kalyebara was the Commandant of the Uganda Military Academy, Kabamba, in Mubende District, Central Uganda.

== History ==
Clovis Kalyebara was born in Harugongo Village, Kichwamba Sub County, in Kabarole District, Western Uganda.

== Military career ==
Among the many positions that Clovis Kalyebara served in as a member of the Uganda People's Defence Force, are the following:

- Deputy Commander of the 2nd Uganda People's Defence Force Division, based in Gulu in 2001.
- Director of Operation in the Office of the Army Commander, at the rank of lieutenant colonel, in 2005.
- Deputy Commandant of the Uganda Senior Command and Staff College, Kimaka, Jinja District
- Uganda's military attaché to the African Union headquarters in Addis Ababa
- Commandant of the Uganda Military Academy, Kabamba, Mubende District
- Uganda's Military Attaché to the country's High Commission in Nairobi, Kenya, in 2013, at the rank of brigadier.

== See also ==
- Wilson Mbadi
- David Muhoozi
- Leopold Kyanda
- Katumba Wamala
