= Robert Rusoke =

Ugandan general

Uganda’s Ambassador to the Republic of Rwanda
- Incumbent
- Assumed office December 2021

Uganda’s Ambassador to the Republic of South Sudan
- Incumbent
- Assumed office August 2012

Joint Chief of Staff of the Uganda People’s Defence Forces
- In office 2005–2012

Personal details
- Born: Uganda
- Profession: Military officer, diplomat

Military service
- Allegiance: Uganda People's Defence Force
- Rank: Major General

Major General Robert Rusoke is a Ugandan military officer and diplomat. Currently he serves as Uganda's Ambassador to the Republic of Rwanda. He was appointed to that position in December 2021. Prior to that appointment, he served as the Ambassador to the Republic of South Sudan and Joint Chief of Staff of the Uganda People's Defence Forces.

== See also ==
- Fredrick Mugisha
- Wilson Mbadi
- Muhoozi Kainerugaba

== Succession table as Joint Chief of Staff of the UPDF ==
Military offices
Preceded by Unknown; As Joint Chief of Staff of the UPDF	Joint Chief of Staff of the UPDF; 2005 - 2012	Succeeded by Fredrick Mugisha; As Joint Chief of Staff of the UPDF
