= Charles Okidi =

Ugandan general

Lieutenant General Charles Okidi
- Born: Uganda
- Occupation: Military Officer
- Years active: 1986 - present
- Known for: Military Matters
- Title: Commander of UPDF Air Force

Lieutenant General Charles Okidi, is a senior Ugandan military officer in the Uganda People's Defence Force (UPDF). He is the Commander of the UPDF Air Force, effective November 2022. He replaced Lieutenant General Charles Lutaaya who was appointed a presidential advisor. Before that, from 11 December 2019 until 7 November 2022, he was the Chief of Staff of the UPDF Air Force. Prior to that, he was the Director Operations at the UPDF Air Force Headquarters at Entebbe.

== Work history ==
Okidi serves as a long-term presidential pilot, concurrently with his military duties. He has previously served as the Air Force Wing Commander, Nakasongola Air Force Base. Before that, he was the Commander of the Air Force Wing, Entebbe Air Force Base. Prior to that he was a Squadron Commander and Officer Commanding Operations at Entebbe Air Force Wing.

As Chief of Staff of the UPDF Air Force, he replaced Major General Paul Lokech, who was assigned special duties in South Sudan. On 28 March 2020, he was promoted from the rank of Brigadier to that of Major General. He was promoted to Lieutenant General at the time he was appointed Air Force commander.

== See also ==
- Stephen Kiggundu
- Charles Lutaaya
- Gavas Mugyenyi
- James Birungi
