= Chris Magezi =

Ugandan military officer

Col. Chris Magezi
- Born: 1978 (age 47–48)
- Citizenship: Ugandan
- Education: Makerere University; UK Joint Services Command and Staff College, Defense Academy; King's College London
- Occupation: Military Officer
- Employer: Uganda Peoples Defense Forces
- Title: Colonel
- Predecessor: Maj. Gen. Felix Kulayige

Col. Chris Magezi (born 1978) is a Ugandan, military officer serving as spokesperson of Uganda People's Defence Forces (UPDF). He is also the military assistant to Chief of Defence Forces (CDF), Gen. Muhoozi Kainerugaba.

== Education and Background ==
Chris Magezi was born in 1978. He holds a bachelor of journalism and mass communication from makerere university in 2015. In 1999, Magezi did a basic military course at Singo military training school in Kapeeka sub-county, Nakaseke district. He did a brief course in Peace and Support Operations from Kenya and returned to Uganda to attend the officer cadet course at the school of infantry in Jinja from 2000 to 2001.

In August 2001. Magezi graduated as 2nd Lieutenant and also did a company commanders course at Junior Command and Staff College in Jinja in 2009. In July 2021, Magezi did a one-year Advanced Command and Staff Course at the UK's Joint Services Command and Staff College, Defense Academy. He got a Master of Arts Defense Studies from King's College London in 2021.

== Career ==
Chris Magezi is a member of Special Forces Command (SFC) and the military assistant to the CDF, Gen. Muhoozi Keinerugaba. He was appointed as acting spokesperson of Uganda People's Defence Forces (UPDF) running the office of the defense public information (DDPIO) by UPDF chief of joint staff Maj. Gen. Jack Bakasumba in 2025. He also headed the office of Public Information Officer for UPDF Land Forces (PIOLF).

Magezi served as the special forces command spokesperson and deputy UPDF spokesperson deputising Brig Kulayigye. Between July 2009 and July 2011, he served as the UPDF contingent spokesperson under the UN-backed African Union mission in Somalia.

Magezi was the UPDF spokesperson in different areas including, during the army's operation code named lightning thunder against the lord's resistance army (LRA) rebels in north-eastern DR Congo, the Ugandan government delegation during the Juba peace talks between the LRA and also the army spokesperson in Northern Uganda during the LRA insurgency, between 2003 and 2007, the Second Infantry Division in Mbarara City and the Fifth Infantry Division in Pader district. He became the first spokesperson of the newly formed 5th Infantry Division based in Pader under the command of the then Col. John Mugume in 2004.

Magezi was a Platoon and later a company Commander of the 23rd Infantry Battalion headquartered in Kitgum district during the UPDF offensive dubbed Operation Iron Fist in Gulu from 2001 to 2003. He was promoted to the rank of Lt. Colonel, colonel in 2024 and appointed military assistant for public relations to the Chief of Defense Forces.

== See also ==
- John Mugume
- Muhoozi Kainerugaba
