= David Kasura Kyomukama =

Major General David Kasura Kyomukama

Permanent Secretary of the Ministry of Agriculture, Animal Industry and Fisheries
- Incumbent
- Assumed office August 2021
- President: Yoweri Museveni
- Minister: Frank Tumwebaze
- Preceded by: Pius Wakabi

Personal details
- Born: 1945 (age 80–81)
- Occupation: Military officer, civil servant
- Profession: Soldier

Military service
- Allegiance: Uganda
- Branch/service: Uganda People's Defence Forces
- Rank: Major General

David Kasura Kyomukama also known as Maj. Gen. David Kasura Kyomukama (born 1945) is a Ugandan military officer and Permanent Secretary of the Ministry of Agriculture, Animal Industry and Fisheries (MAAIF).

== Education background ==
Maj. Gen. Kasura holds a Bachelor of Science from Makerere University and master's degree from the University of Salford in Manchester, United Kingdom. He has also undertaken military and leadership training in Cuba, Russia, China, and the United Kingdom.

== Career ==
Maj. Gen. Kasura served in the Uganda People's Defence Forces before becoming Uganda's Defence Liaison Officer to the East African Community Secretariat in Arusha. From 2014 to 2021, he directed the National Leadership Institute, Kyankwanzi.

In August 2021, Kasura was appointed Permanent Secretary of the Ministry of Agriculture, Animal Industry and Fisheries, overseeing ministry operations and agricultural policies. Since 2021, he has also served on the National Agricultural Research Organization Council.

== Honors and achievements ==
Maj. Gen. Kasura was promoted to the rank of Major General in the Uganda People's Defence Forces (UPDF) in 2020 by President Yoweri Museveni.

== See also ==
- Don Nabasa
- Leopold Kyanda
- Charles Okidi
