= Levi Karuhanga =

Ugandan major general

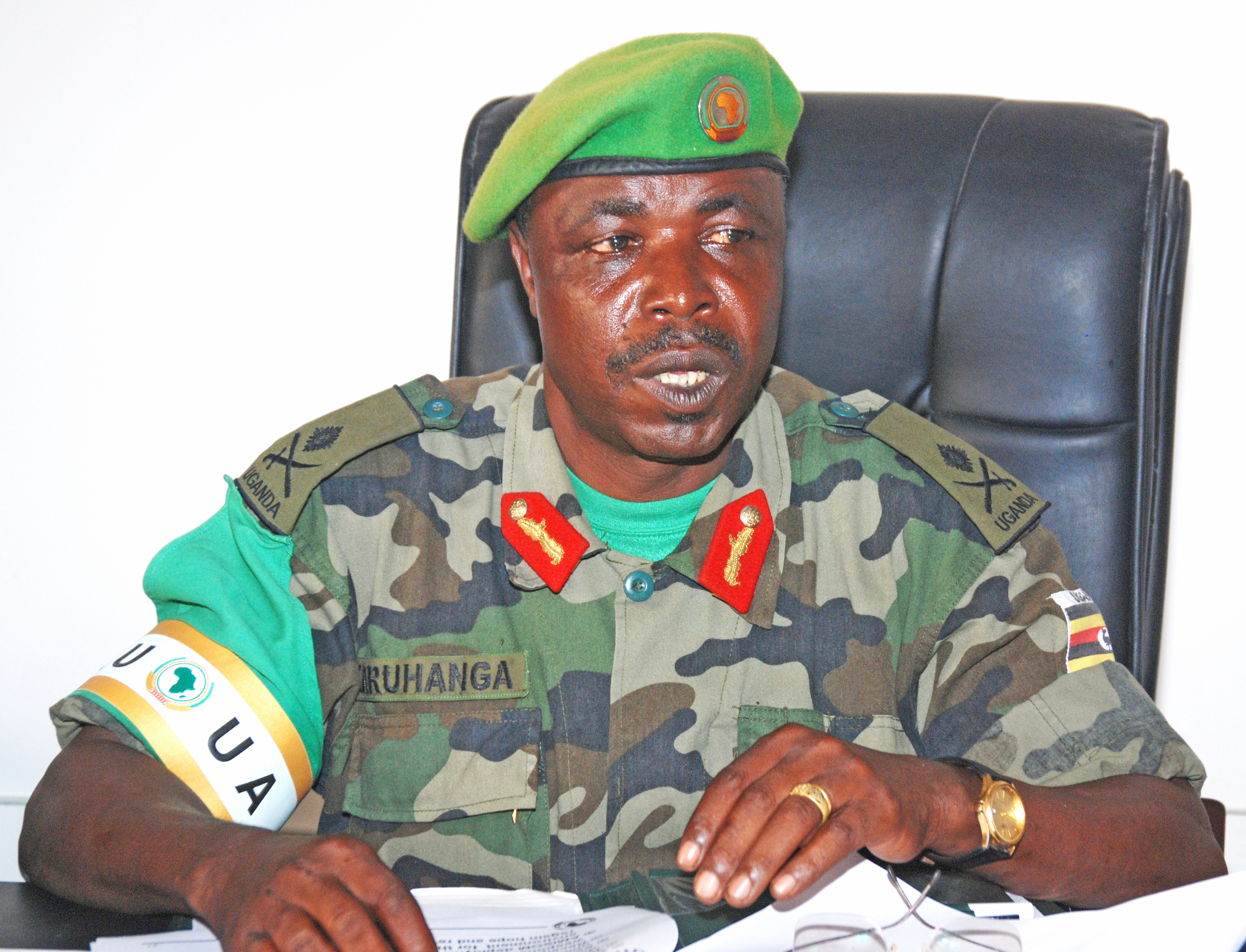
- Born: 24 February 1956; Bushenyi District, Uganda
- Died: 21 April 2016 (aged 60); Kampala, Uganda
- Citizenship: Uganda
- Education: China War College (Armoured Warfare Corse); Egyptian Military Academy (Strategic Military Studies); Armed Forces Command and Staff College, Jaji (Senior Command and Staff Course); National Defence College, Kenya (National Strategic Studies Course)
- Occupation: Military officer
- Years active: 1981–2016
- Known for: Military matters

Levi Karuhanga (24 February 1956 – 21 April 2016) was a major general in Uganda. He was the Chairman of the UPDF General Court Martial, one of the highest military courts in the Uganda People's Defence Force (UPDF). He was appointed to that position in June 2014 by Yoweri Museveni, the commander in chief of the UPDF and the president of Uganda. He replaced Moses Ddiba Ssentongo whose one-year tenure at the court had expired. Karuhanga had previously served as the Commander of the Reserve Force in the UPDF.

== Background ==
Karuhanga was born in Bushenyi District in the Western Region of Uganda on 24 February 1956. He studied at Nyamitoma, Bweranyangi, and Mwengura Primary Schools. He then joined Mbarara High School, from where he moved to Nairobi, Kenya, where he graduated with a diploma in international studies.

He joined the Ugandan Bush War around 1981 in Luweero District. His recruitment number was RO/057, the 57th recruit of the then new rebel force. He fought throughout the war until the National Resistance Army captured power in 1986. His military training included the following courses:

- Strategic Military Studies at the Egyptian Military Academy in Cairo
- Military Course at the China War College
- Military Course at the Armed Forces Command and Staff College, Jaji, Nigeria
- National Strategic Studies course from National Defence College, Kenya, from July 2006 until June 2007.
- Other military courses at military schools in Kenya and Uganda.

== Military career ==
Karuhanga served in a number of assignments in the UPDF, including in the following positions:

- brigade commander in the UPDF 4th Division, between 1990 and 1992
- member of the UPDF Contingent and second in command of United Nations forces in Liberia, in 1994
- deputy commander of the 3rd UPDF Division, in 1998
- 3rd Division commanding officer in 2001
- First Division commanding officer from 2005 until 2007
- In 2007, Karuhanga was appointed as the first commander of the African Union Mission to Somalia, serving in that capacity until 2008.
- In 2010, he was appointed commanding officer of the UPDF Reserve Force, serving there until June 2014, when he was given his last assignment.

== Death ==
Levi Karuhanga died on 21 April 2016.

== See also ==
- Andrew Gutti
- David Muhoozi
- Fred Tolit
- Ivan Koreta

Military offices
Preceded by None	Commander of AMISOM; 14 February 2007 – 3 March 2008	Succeeded by Major General Francis Okello
