= Joram Mugume =

Ugandan military officer

General Joram Mugume
- Born: 1952 (age 73–74); Kiruhura District, Uganda
- Citizenship: Uganda
- Occupation: Military Officer
- Years active: 1979 – present
- Known for: Military Matters

General Joram Mugume, is a military officer in the Uganda People's Defence Forces (UPDF). He is the chairman of the board of directors of the National Enterprise Corporation (NEC), the business arm of the UPDF. He was appointed to that position by the Uganda Ministry of Defence and Veterans Affairs, on 20 February 2018. He has also served as the chairman of the "Military Land Board", another organ of the UPDF. He has been serving in that position since 2005, having served as Deputy Chief of Defense Forces in the past.

== Background ==
He was born in Kiruhura District, in Uganda's Western Region.

== Overview ==
Joram Mugume was one of the first people to join the National Resistance Army (NRA). His military number is RO/00037, meaning he was the 37th recruit. When NRA captured Kampala in 1986, Mugume was the Commander of the 3rd Battalion. Later, he served as deputy army commander. When General David Sejusa was kicked out of the Ugandan parliament, Joram Mugume was one of the five military officers nominated to replace him. In May 2016, President Yoweri Museveni promoted him to the rank of lieutenant general. In February 2019, he was promoted to the rank of a Four-star General, in a promotions exercise that involved over 2,000 men and women of the UPDF.

== See also ==
- Charles Angina
- James Mugira
