= Gavas Mugyenyi =

Ugandan general

Major General Gavas Mugyenyi
- Born: Uganda
- Occupation: Military Officer
- Years active: 1981–present
- Known for: Military Matters

Major General Gavas Mugyenyi, also Garvas Mugyenyi is a senior military officer in the Uganda People's Defence Forces (UPDF). He serves as Uganda's military attache to India, effective January 2020.

Before that, from December 2017 until January 2020, he served as the deputy commander of the UPDF Air Force, replacing Major General Sam Kavuma, who was appointed deputy commander of the UPDF Land Forces.

== Military career ==
In January 2017, at the rank of Major General, served as the commander of the Air Defence Division of the UPDF, based in Nakasongola.

== See also ==
- David Muhoozi
- Wilson Mbadi
- Charles Lutaaya
- Peter Elwelu
- Muhoozi Kainerugaba
- UG Military Schools
