= James Birungi =

Ugandan general (born 1973)

Major General James Birungi
- Born: January 1, 1973 (age 53); Ngoma, Nakaseke District, Uganda
- Citizenship: Uganda
- Occupation: Military officer
- Known for: Military matters

James Birungi (born 1 January 1973) is a Major General in the Uganda People's Defence Forces (UPDF). He serves as the Mountain Division commander in the UPDF, effective April 2025.

Before that, from January 2022 to April 2025, he served as the Chief of Defense Intelligence and Security (CDIS), formerly CMI. From 16 December 2020 until 25 January 2022, he served on special assignment "to monitor on behalf of the guarantors of the South Sudan peace process, the assembling, screening, demobilization and integration of the armed forces of South Sudan".

From June 2019 to 16 December 2020, he served as the commander of the Special Forces Command (SFC), a specialized command unit of the UPDF, that is responsible for the security of the President of Uganda, his immediate family, the constitutional monarchs and vital national installations, including the country's oil fields.

He was replaced by Lt. Gen. Muhoozi Kainerugaba who had earlier been in charge of the same force. He replaced Major General Don William Nabasa, who left Uganda to attend a course at the National Defence College in China.

== Military career ==
From 2016 to 2019, he was chief of air force staff of Uganda Air Force, replaced by Colonel Emmanuel Kwihangana. In February 2019, he was promoted to major general, when over 2,000 UPDF men and women received promotions. In his position as Head of the Chieftaincy of Military Intelligence (CMI), in the UPDF, he replaced Major General Abel Kandiho, who was posted to South Sudan, as a special envoy.

== See also ==
- David Muhoozi
- Charles Lutaaya
- Sabiiti Muzeyi
