= Joseph Musanyufu =

Lieutenant general in the Uganda People's Defence Force (born 1962)

Lieutenant General Joseph Musanyufu Butamanya
- Born: 1962 (age 63–64); Uganda
- Citizenship: Uganda
- Occupation: Military officer
- Years active: 1985 – present
- Known for: Military matters
- Title: Permanent Secretary Ministry of Internal Affairs

Joseph Musanyufu is a lieutenant general in the Uganda People's Defence Force (UPDF), who serves as the Permanent Secretary Ministry of Internal Affairs, Uganda. Immediately prior to his current appointment, he served as Joint Chief of Staff, the third highest rank in the Ugandan military. He has four children, 1 son Musanyufu Chris jr and 2 daughters. Musanyufu also served as the Chief of Personnel and Administration in the UPDF, a position that he was appointed to in 2014.

Musanyufu replaced Wilson Mbadi, who was promoted to the rank of lieutenant general and appointed as deputy chief of defence forces in the UPDF. Musanyufu, who was a brigadier prior to his current appointment, was promoted to major general at the time he was appointed as joint chief of staff.

== Background and education ==
He was born circa 1962 in present-day Bushenyi District, in Uganda's Western Region. Prior to joining the military, he studied at Kitabi Seminary, in Bushenyi District and Ntare School in Mbarara District becoming one of the top students in his year. He later went to Makerere University graduating with 1st-class honors bachelor's degree in economics.

During his service in the UPDF, he attended a senior command course at a staff college in the United States and staff college at Royal Military College Sandhurst [United Kingdom] and another course at the National Defense College in India.

== Career ==
In August 1985, Musanyufu joined the National Resistance Army, the precursor to the UPDF. At that time, his recruit class included James Mugira, Shaban Bantariza and David Muhoozi. He at one time served as an ADC to Mugisha Muntu, then the commander of the Ugandan military. Musanyufu also served as the deputy to the late Nobel Mayombo, at the time Mayombo served as the chief of military intelligence.

Later, Musanyufu served as chief comptroller finance of the UPDF and then as chief of integrated resource management information system. In his new role as the UPDF joint chief of staff, he is a close military adviser to the president of Uganda, who is also the commander in chief of the UPDF.

On 8 February 2019, over 2,000 UPDF men and women were promoted on one day. That day Joseph Musanyufu was promoted from the rank of major general to that of lieutenant general.

== See also ==
- Dick Olum
- Leopold Kyanda
