= Michael Ondoga =

Ugandan military officer

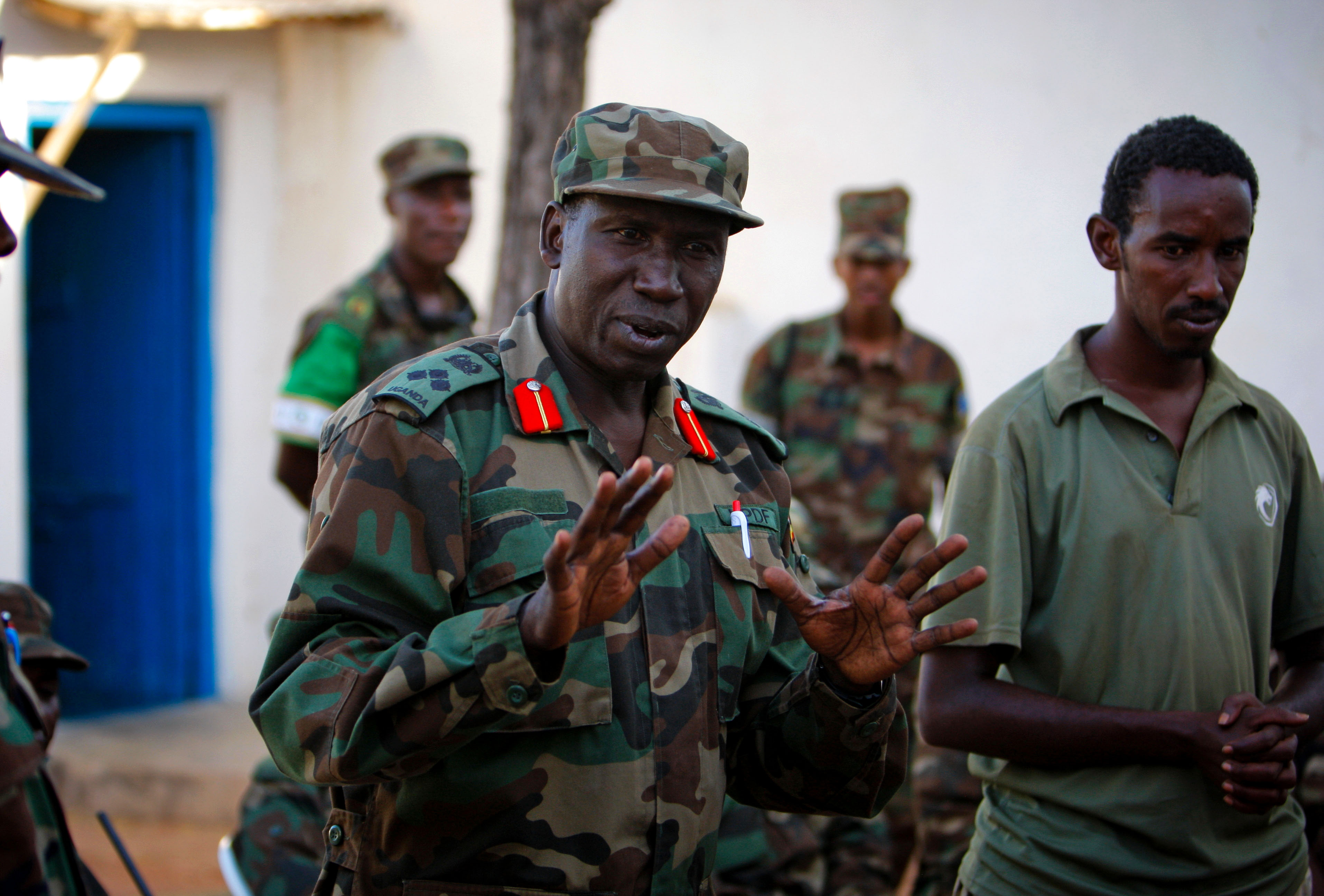
- Michael Ondoga in Somalia 2013
- Born: 1960 (age 65–66); Moyo District, Uganda
- Citizenship: Uganda
- Occupation: Military Officer
- Years active: 1986 — 2023
- Known for: Military
- Spouse: Lucy Ondoga

Major General Michael Ondoga (born 1960) is a senior military officer in the Uganda People's Defence Force (UPDF). He currently serves as the Military Attaché to the Kingdom of Saudi Arabia. He was appointed to that position in July 2019.

== Background ==
Michael Ondoga was born in Moyo District circa 1960.

== Military career ==
He served as the commander of the UPDF contingent in Somalia as part of the African Union Mission to Somalia (AMISOM). He served in that position from 2012 until 2013. Ondoga was recalled to Kampala in October 2013, after allegations of "food theft", "illegal sale of arms" and "pilfering of fuel" arose in Mogadishu.

Following his acquittal on all charges in May 2015, he spent another 10 months undeployed. In March 2016, he was assigned to the National Enterprise Corporation as Deputy Director General responsible for the Kyoga Project, the Uganda military’s Nakasongola-based explosives program. He reports directly to NEC's Director General, Major General James Mugira.

== Court martial ==
In November 2013, Brigadier Ondoga was arrested, together with two subordinates who were under his command in Somalia. He was charged with a multitude (over 30) of charges including "failure to discharge" his duties. He was brought under the General Court Marshall, chaired by Brigadier Moses Ddiba Ssentongo. While in detention, following denial of bail on multiple occasions, he underwent a surgical procedure at Bombo Military Hospital, in May 2014. In May 2015, he was acquitted of all charges by the court martial, chaired by Major General Levi Karuhanga, and released from detention.

== Personal life ==
Major General Michael Odonga is a married father.
