= Abel Kandiho =

Ugandan general

Major General Abel Kandiho
- Born: Gomba, Uganda
- Citizenship: Uganda
- Occupation: Military officer
- Known for: Military Matters
- Title: Joint Chief of Staff in the Uganda Police Force

Major General Abel Kandiho, is a Ugandan military officer. He was appointed Senior Presidential Advisor on Friday 17 May 2024. He had previously served as the Joint Chief of Staff in the Uganda Police Force, effective 9 February 2022.

From 25 January 2022 until 8 February 2022, he was assigned to duty in South Sudan, as a Special Envoy. However, this assignment was reversed and instead he was appointed Chief of Joint Staff of Uganda Police Force.

He previously served as the Chief of Military Intelligence in the Uganda People's Defence Force (UPDF).

== Career ==
It has been reported in the past that Kandiho blames the spate of killings in Ugandan urban areas in the period between 2015 and 2018 to a network of thugs linked to General Kale Kayihura, the former Inspector General of Police. Kandiho "privately accused the former police chief of waging a campaign aimed at depicting the inner towns as ungovernable". Kandiho, in his capacity as the Head of CMI, was one of the people who personally interrogated Kale Kayihura, following his arrest in 2018.

In November 2017, at the rank of colonel and as Commander of the Chieftaincy of Military Intelligence, he was promoted to the rank of brigadier. In December 2019, at the rank of Brigadier, Kandiho met with Lieutenant General Jeremiah Nyembe, the South African Military Intelligence chief, for the purpose of sharing information.

Previously, before May 2014, at the rank of lieutenant colonel, he served as the commander of Makindye Military Barracks; the headquarters of the UPDF Military Police. On 30 May 2014, he was replaced in that position by Colonel Emmanuel Kanyesigye. Kandiho stayed on as Deputy Commander.

In 2009, at the rank of major, Kandiho was a military officer at CMI. In 2019, The Independent (Uganda) newspaper reported that Kandiho worked at the Uganda High Commission in Kigali, Rwanda, in the early 2000s, where he had disagreements with Rwandan security forces.

In December 2021, Abel Kandiho, is targeted by United States sanctions the U.S. Department of the Treasury announced. Abel Kandiho's assets in the United States are now frozen. At issue: his alleged involvement in cases of human rights violations.

In January 2022, he was replaced as the Head of Military Intelligence in the UPDF by Major General James Birungi. Kandiho was reassigned special duties in South Sudan.

== See also ==
- Elly Kayanja
- Sabiiti Muzeyi
- Leopold Kyanda
