= Presidential Guard Brigade (Uganda) =

Elite brigade of the army responsible for protecting the Ugandan president

Presidential Guards Brigade
- Active: 1996 – present
- Country: Uganda
- Allegiance: President of Uganda, Yoweri Museveni
- Branch: Ugandan Special Forces Command
- Type: Special forces
- Size: Brigade
- Headquarters: Kampala
- Nickname: PGB

The Presidential Guards Brigade (PGB) is one of the special forces units of the Uganda People's Defence Force charged with counterterrorism, counter-revolutionary, and protecting the President of Uganda. It has been described as President Yoweri Museveni's "army within an army".

== Overview ==
It began in 1996 as the Presidential Protection Unit (PPU) and expanded to a full-fledged brigade on 21 February 2003. As such, the commander at the time, Captain Muhoozi Kainerugaba, President Museveni's son, was promoted to a major. In 2010, it was placed under Ugandan Special Forces Command (USFC).

The 10,000-strong brigade has personnel pulled from western Uganda and trained to be loyal to the president first and foremost. The unit is responsible for counter-revolutionary, irregular warfare operations, preventing terrorist attacks in the country, protecting the President of Uganda, providing security in the Lake Albert region, and conducting special operations assigned.

== See also ==
- Presidential Guard (Zimbabwe)
- Presidential Guard Brigade (Nigeria)
