= Don Nabasa =

Ugandan military general

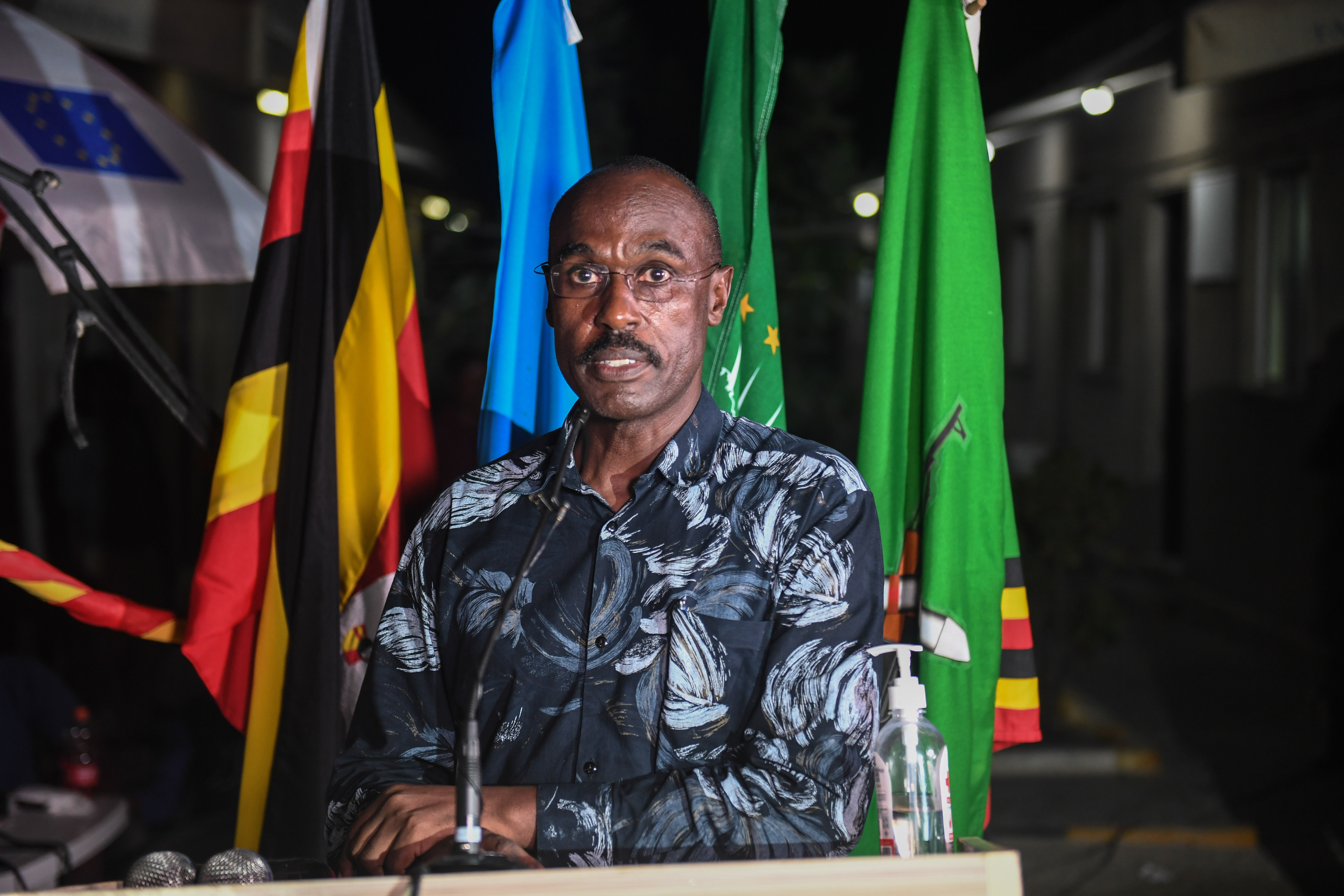
- Born: c. 1976 (age 49–50); Uganda
- Branch: Uganda People's Defence Forces
- Service years: 1999 – present
- Rank: Major General
- Commands: Joint Staff Policy and Strategy in the UPDF

Major General Don William Nabasa, is a Ugandan military officer in the Uganda People's Defence Forces (UPDF). He currently serves as the Joint Staff Policy and Strategy in the UPDF. He was appointed to that position of 3 January 2025. Before that, he was the commander of the UPDF's Third Infantry Division, headquartered in Moroto.

Prior to his assignment in Moroto, Major General Nabasa served as the Commander of the UPDF Military Police, effective 26 October 2021. Before that, he was the commander of the Uganda contingent in Somalia as part of AMISOM.

Previously, Nabasa was the Commander of the Special Forces Command (SFC), an elite unit that is responsible for the security of the President of Uganda, and that of traditional cultural leaders and vital national installations, as well as the country's oilfields. He assumed command of the SFC, in January 2017, taking over from Muhoozi Kainerugaba, who was appointed Senior Presidential Adviser on military affairs.

== Background ==
He was born in the Western Region of Uganda, circa 1976.

== Military education ==
Don Nabasa joined the Uganda military in 1998. In 1999, he was commissioned as a Second Lieutenant, following the completion of an Officer Cadet Course at UPDF School of Infantry, then located in Jinja, in Uganda's Eastern Region.

Over the years, Don Nabasa has attended many military courses, including the following:

The Military Training of Brigadier Don Nabasa
Number	Name of Course	School	Graduation	Rank at Graduation
1	Officer Cadet Course	UPDF Officer Cadet School	1999	Second Lieutenant
2	Tank Crew and Command Course	UPDF School of Infantry	2000	First Lieutenant
3	Tank Platoon Commanders’ Course	UPDF School of Infantry	2001	Captain
4	Tank Company Commanders’ Course	UPDF School of Infantry	2002	Captain
5	Tank Battalion Commanders’ Course	UPDF School of Infantry	2003	Captain
6	Junior Command Course	Indian Military Academy	2006	Major
7	Motorized Battalion Commanders’ Course	Kalama Armoured Warfare Training School	2008	Major
8	Junior Staff Course	Uganda Junior Staff College	2009	Major
9	Strategic Maritime Anti-Terrorism Course	John C. Stennis Space Center	2010	Lieutenant Colonel
10	Senior Command and Staff Course	Uganda Senior Command and Staff College	2012	Colonel

== Military career ==
Over the years, Nabasa has commanded various units in the UPDF, starting with an infantry platoon in 1999, then a tank platoon in 2000, then serving as a brigade operations officer from 2004 until 2005.

He commanded a tank squadron between 2000 and 2007, then as the commanding officer of a battalion from 2008 until 2012 and as commander of a Group, from 2012 until 2016. From 2016 until his assignment to head the SFC, he served as the Deputy Commander of the Special Forces Command, a division within the UPDF.

In February 2019 he was promoted from the rank of Brigadier to that of Major General, as a part of a promotions exercise involving over 2,000 men and women of the UPDF.

In November 2021, he officially assumed office as the Commander of the UPDF Military Police, from Brigadier Keith Katungi, who will exchange positions with him and head to Somalia as Commander of the Ugandan unit at AMISOM.

== Other responsibilities ==
Brigadier Don Nabasa commanded operations in Somalia, in 2014, as part of the AMISOM peace-keeping mission, sanctioned by the United Nations, and operated by the African Union.

== See also ==
- Sabiiti Muzeyi
- Uganda People's Defence Forces
- Wilson Mbadi
