= Geoffrey Tumusiime =

Ugandan general

Major General Geoffrey Tumusiime
- Born: Mbarara, Uganda
- Citizenship: Uganda
- Occupation: Military officer
- Known for: Military matters

Geoffrey Katsigazi Tumusiime, is a Ugandan military officer and diplomat, who serves as the Inspector General of Police of Uganda, since 4 March 2024. He is a Major General in the UPDF and immediately prior to his current assignment, he served as the Deputy Commander of the UPDF Air Force. Previously, he served as the Defence Liaison Officer at the headquarters of the East African Community, in Arusha, Tanzania.

== Military career ==
Major General Geoffrey Katsigazi Tumusiime served in the past as Commander of the UPDF Motorized Infantry Brigade and as the Acting Chief of Staff of the UPDF Land Forces, among other appointments.

In January 2020, he took over as deputy commander of the UPDF Air Force, replacing Major General Gavas Mugyenyi, who was appointed Uganda's military attache to India. On 28 March 2020, he was promoted from the rank of Brigadier to that of Major General.

== See also ==
- Charles Lutaaya
