= Sabiiti Muzeyi =

Ugandan military general and policeman

Major General Steven Sabiiti Muzeeyi
- Born: December 1, 1975 (age 50); Uganda
- Citizenship: Uganda
- Education: Makerere University (Bachelor of Science in Biochemistry); Uganda Senior Command and Staff College (Junior Command Course); Military College in Russia (Senior Command Course)
- Occupations: Military officer & Police Officer
- Years active: Since 1998
- Known for: Military Matters & Police Work

Major General Steven Sabiiti Muzeyi (born 1975) is a Ugandan military officer and police officer who served as the Deputy Inspector General of Police (DIGP) of the Uganda Police Force, the second-highest rank in that branch of the Ugandan government, from 4 March 2018 until 16 December 2020.

He replaced Martin Okoth Ochola, who was promoted to Inspector General of Police. Immediately prior to his assignment as DIGP, Sabiiti, at the rank of brigadier, served as the Commander of the Military Police of the Uganda People's Defence Force (UPDF). Sabiiti was replaced as DIGP by Major General Paul Lokech.

On Friday, 5 February 2021, Major General Sabiiti Muzeyi was appointed General Manager Luwero Industries, a subsidiary of National Enterprise Corporation (NEC).

== Background and education ==
He was born in Mbarara District on 1 December 1975. Sabiiti's father Zekeriah Muzeyi Magyenyi was married to one of Museveni’s maternal aunties. A veteran of Uganda's bush war, Magyenyi died in June 2007. Sabiiti’s mother is Javanis Magyenyi. The young Sabiiti attended Ntare School, then Mbarara High School before he was admitted to Makerere University, Uganda's oldest and largest public university.

At Makerere he studied biochemistry, graduating with a First Class Honors degree of Bachelor of Science. In 1997, he joined the UPDF, signing up in what was then the Presidential Protection Unit (PPU). The PPU has since been renamed the Special Forces Command (SFC). Sabiiti attended boot camp at Kasenyi Training Wing, in Entebbe. A total of 117 recruits began the basic training course. Twenty five of them dropped out and the new Captain Sabiiti Muzeyi graduated at the top of the remaining 92.

Later, he studied at the Uganda Senior Command and Staff College, in Jinja, in Uganda's Eastern Region. At the rank of colonel, he won a slot to attend a senior command course at the United States Army Command and General Staff College at Fort Leavenworth, in Kansas. When the United States government blocked his admission, he was instead sent to a military college in Russia. He is a member of the Anglican Church of Uganda.

== Career ==
Sabiiti was a member of the PPU security forces that provided VIP security during the visit of United States President Bill Clinton to Uganda 1998. He then enrolled into graduate school and lectured part-time on the advice of family members, before returning to the PPU.

He progressively rose in rank, taking on increased responsibility on the way. When PPU was renamed Presidential Guard Brigade (PGB), with first-son Muhoozi Kainerugaba at the helm, Sabiiti Muzeyi was selected as his second-in-command. Sabiiti, at the rank of lieutenant colonel, commanded the unit, when Muhoozi was in South Africa, attending a military course.

When Muhoozi was promoted to brigadier, Sabiiti was elevated to colonel. He became brigadier and commander of the Uganda Military Police, after his return from the Russian military course. On the evening of Sunday 4 March 2018, he was appointed Deputy Inspector General of Police, to deputize Martin Okoth Ochola.

In February 2019, as part of a promotion exercise involving over 2,000 men and women in the UPDF, he was promoted from brigadier to major general.

== Family ==
Steven Sabiiti Muzeyi is married to Esther Sabiiti. They have two children.

== See also ==
- Uganda Police Force
- Katumba Wamala
- James Birungi
- Luke Kercan Ofungi
- Don Nabasa
