= Protection of Sovereignty Act, 2026 =

Parliament of Uganda
- Long title: An Act to provide for the protection of the sovereignty of the people of Uganda; to designate the department responsible for peace and security as the responsible entity for the registration and regulation of agents to foreigners; to provide for the protection of the sovereignty of Uganda; to provide for the registration of agents of foreigners; to regulate the funding and any other assistance to agents of foreigners and for related matters.
- Passed: 5 May 2026
- Assented to: 17 May 2026
- Commenced: 22 May 2026
- Introduced by: David Muhoozi
- Introduced: 15 April 2026
- Committee responsible: Defence and internal affairs
- Status: In force

The Protection of Sovereignty Art, 2026 is an act of the Parliament of Uganda. It provides for prison sentences of up to twenty years and large fines for "foreign agents" up to 2 billion Ugandan shillings. It was signed by Yoweri Museveni Tibuhaburwa the president of Uganda on 17 May 2026 making it law.

== Legislative history ==
The government proposed the bill on 15 April, and parliament referred it to the committee on defence and internal affairs.

The Uganda Bankers' Association said the bill could "undermine investment and stall economic growth" by creating uncertainty for investors, because the bill could classify ordinary international financial activity as foreign interference.
