= Ugandan Special Forces Command =

Ugandan Special Forces

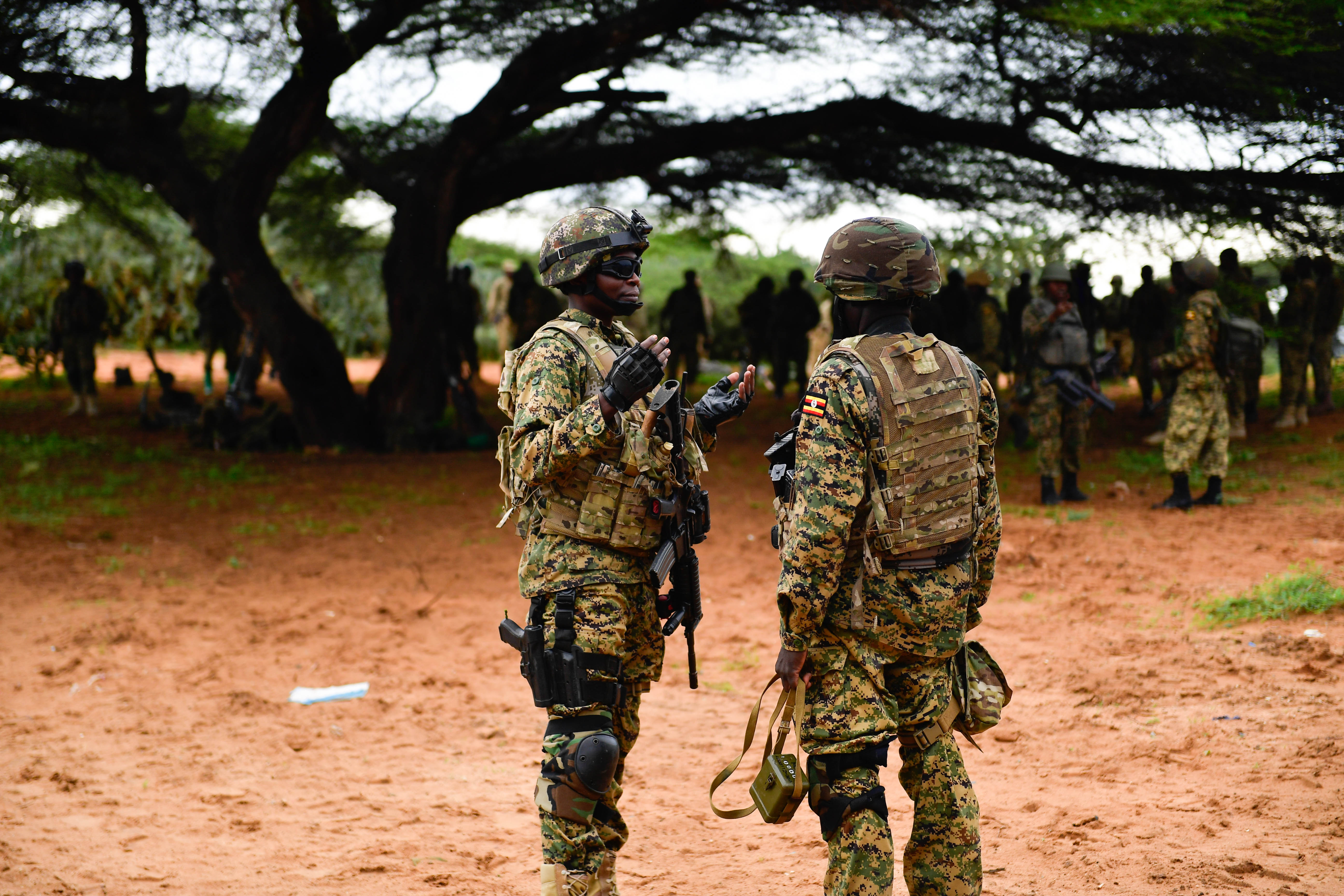
- Operators from the SFC.
- Active: May 1981 – present
- Country: Uganda
- Role: Special operations
- Part of: Uganda People's Defence Force
- Garrison/HQ: Gen. Y. K. Museveni Building, Entebbe, Wakiso District
- Motto: "Asiye Kifani!" ("Incomparable!")
- Website: https://sfc.go.ug

The Ugandan Special Forces Command is specialized component branch of the Uganda People's Defence Force (UPDF) tasked with carrying out specialized missions or operations at a moment’s notice.

The SFC main headquarters are in Entebbe, Wakiso District, with units stationed in various locations, including serving alongside regular UPDF units in locations such as South Sudan and Somalia.

== History ==
From the time of Uganda's independence in 1962 until 1986, the Uganda Army underwent various transformations that included the existence of different Special Forces units, often paramilitary in nature and established for political reasons. The current SFC traces its historical roots to the High Command Unit (HCU) of the National Resistance Army that was established in May 1981 at Kyererezi, in the present day Nakaseke District, during the Ugandan Bush War.

Initially tasked with guarding the chairman of the High Command and undertaking specialized missions, the HCU was led by Commander Robert Kabuura when it was the size of an infantry platoon. Following his tenure, Lieutenant Colonel Akanga Byaruhanga assumed command.

After the war ended in 1986, the HCU transformed into the Presidential Protection Unit (PPU) with approximately 400 soldiers. The PPU later expanded into a brigade whose responsibilities extended beyond protecting the President to upholding constitutional order.

In February 2015, Major General David Muhoozi, the Commander of the Land Forces, expressed interest in bolstering the special forces. On May 16, 2016, Muhoozi Kainerugaba was elevated from the rank of Brigadier to Major General, aimed at aligning his position with the command responsibilities for a service branch. This decision was made in conjunction with the expansion of the Special Forces into an autonomous service branch within the UPDF. The expansion initiative involved augmenting the troop numbers, budget, and equipment of the Special Forces to equate with the existing Land and Air Force, both of which were established following a 2005 defense review.

=== SFC Commanders ===
- Lt Colonel Akanga Byaruhanga
- Lt General Sam Kavuma
- General Muhoozi Kainerugaba
- Maj General Don Nabasa
- Maj General James Birungi
- Brig General Peter Candia
- Brig General Felix Busizoori
- Maj General David Mugisha
- Ag Major General Asaph Mweteise Nyakikuru

== Structure ==
=== Uganda Special Forces School ===
The Uganda Special Forces School is the service academy for the SFC, responsible for training soldiers and officers of the SFC. It is located at Kaweweta, Nakaseke District

=== Special Forces Band ===
The Special Forces Command Band the official military band of the Special Operations Command. On 18 June 2018, training began for over 40 soldiers of the SFC Directorate of Band to form a new musical unit. This was intended on making all three service branches self-reliant in terms of musical accompaniment. Much of the training was provided by its associated band from the Uganda People's Defence Air Forces. The soldiers were trained in music theory, orchestration and aural. On 5 July 2019 a graduation day in honor of the band was held at Sera Kasenyi Training School in the Wakiso District. Congratulation's were made by the representative of the SFC Commander James Birungyi and the UPDF deputy spokesperson. It is one of the few bands in the world that are attached to a special forces unit.

== Creed ==
The Special Forces is the official oath of office for the SFC:

"I am a Ugandan Special Forces Soldier, Prepared to do all that my country requires of me. As a patriot, I will always advocate, teach and promote revolutionary methods of work at whatever level of responsibility. I accept that there is no substitute for loyalty and professionalism within Special Forces. I will maintain alertness and strength in order to be able to fight for Ugandan Independence and Democracy. I will ensure that all the equipment under my charge is maintained well and is combat ready. In battle, I shall never surrender and will always strive never to let my comrades down. I shall resist any tendency that may injure the cohesion of Special Forces. I pray Almighty God will give me the strength to remain loyal, obedient, selfless and disciplined."
