= Kiggundu =

Kiggundu is a surname. Notable people with the surname include:

- Badru Kiggundu, Ugandan civil engineer
- Bruno Kiggundu, Ugandan Musician and Guitarist
- Hamis Kiggundu (born 1984), Ugandan businessman
- Jane Kiggundu, Ugandan lawyer
- Stephen Kiggundu (1977–2024), Ugandan military officer
