= Tumusiime =

Tumusiime is a surname of Ugandan origin. Notable people with the surname include:

- Emmanuel Tumusiime-Mutebile (1949–2022), Ugandan economist and banker
- Flavia Tumusiime (born 1988), Ugandan actress, radio and television host, voice-over artist
- Geoffrey Tumusiime, Ugandan military officer and diplomat
- James R Tumusiime (born 1950), Ugandan author, journalist, and entrepreneur
- Margaret Tumusiime (born 1962), archer from Uganda
- Rosemary Tumusiime (born 1962), Ugandan marketing professional, public administrator, feminist and politician
- Samuel Tumusiime (born 1994), Ugandan computer Scientist and health worker
