= Fred Tolit =

Ugandan military officer

- Born: Uganda
- Citizenship: Uganda
- Occupation: Military officer
- Years active: 1995 – present

Major General Fred Ociti Tolit, is a retired military officer in the Uganda People's Defense Force. He served as Uganda's Defense Attaché to South Africa, based at the country's embassy in Pretoria. He previously served as Uganda's defence attaché to Burundi, based at Uganda's Embassy in Bujumbura, since 2016.

Before that, from 2013, he served as Uganda's defense attaché to the headquarters of the African Union in Addis Ababa, Ethiopia. Prior to that, he served as the Chairman of the UPDF General Court Martial, one of the highest military courts in the Uganda People's Defence Force (UPDF). He was replaced by Brigadier Moses Ddiba Ssentongo, in June 2013.

== Background ==
He was born in Pachua Village, Mucwini Sub-county, Kitgum District in the Acholi sub-region of the Northern Region of Uganda.

== Military career ==
His military career includes service in the flowing capacities:

1. As Director of Military Intelligence, from 1993 until 1998.

2. As Chief of Operations and Training in UPDF in 1998.

3. As Commander of the 2nd Infantry Division, between 2000 and 2001.

4. As the Assistant Army Chief of Staff, at the level of Colonel, between 2001 and 2003.

5. As Defense Liaison Officer at the East African Community, headquarters in Arusha, Tanzania, between 2005 and 2009.

6. As Defence Attaché to Uganda's permanent mission to the United Nations headquarters in New York City.

7. As Chairman of the General Court Martial of the UPDF, at the rank of Brigadier in 2012.

8. As Uganda's Defence Attaché at the African Union headquarters in Addis Ababa, starting in 2013.

9. In 2016, he was transferred to the Uganda Embassy in Bujumbura, Burundi, as the Defence Attaché.

== See also ==
- Charles Angina
- Moses Ssentongo
- Henry Tumukunde
- Leopold Kyanda
- Nobel Mayombo
