= Judy Rugasira Kyanda =

Ugandan businesswoman

- Born: August 31, 1972 (age 54)
- Citizenship: Ugandan
- Education: Buganda Road Primary School, Ellerslie School, Malvern College, University of Reading
- Occupations: Real Estate Agency, Consultancy, Surveyor
- Years active: 1990-Date
- Organization: Knight Frank
- Notable work: Women In Rael Estates
- Title: Managing Director
- Spouse: Leopold Kyanda
- Parents: Henry Rugasira (father); Martha Rugasira (mother)
- Website: https://www.knightfrank.ug/

Judy Rugasira Kyanda (born August 31, 1972) is a Ugandan businesswoman, Entrepreneur and real estate specialist and Managing Director of Knight Frank Uganda Limited for about 25 years, a real estates agency and consultancy firm.

== Background and education ==
Judy was born to Henry and Martha Rugasira, her father was a businessman, management consultant and entrepreneur who at a time owned the only school chalk factory in Uganda and her mother worked as an administrator for Uganda Development Bank.

Judy started her education from Buganda Road Primary School for Primary 1 up to 6 before moving to United Kingdom (UK). While in the UK, she went to Ellerslie School, Malvern College then after she joined University of Reading where she attained her Bsc. (Hons) in Land Management. She later attained a Msc. in International Real Estate from the same university.

== Career ==
After her bachelor's degree, Judy joined Mason, Owen and partners, a firm of Chartered surveyors in Mayfair London. In 1995, she came back to Uganda and worked with her employer then Steven Bamwanga, a land economist who was also a friend to her father. She later went back to pursue her Masters after four years of working in Uganda at University of Reading where she was head hunted by Knight Frank to be their managing director in Uganda and that she has been since.

Judy was the vice president of Association Of Real Estates Agents(AREA) Uganda, Between 2012 and 2014, she was the director Africa Real Estates Society (AFRES) and a member of Enterprise Group Uganda.

In 2017, Judy was appointed Head of Surveyors Board by the minister of Lands, Housing and Urban Development, Betty Amongi.

== Personal life ==
She is married to Leopold Kyanda, a Major General in the Uganda People's Defence Force (UPDF).
