= Peter Elwelu =

Ugandan military officer (born 1966)

Lieutenant General (Retired) Peter Elwelu
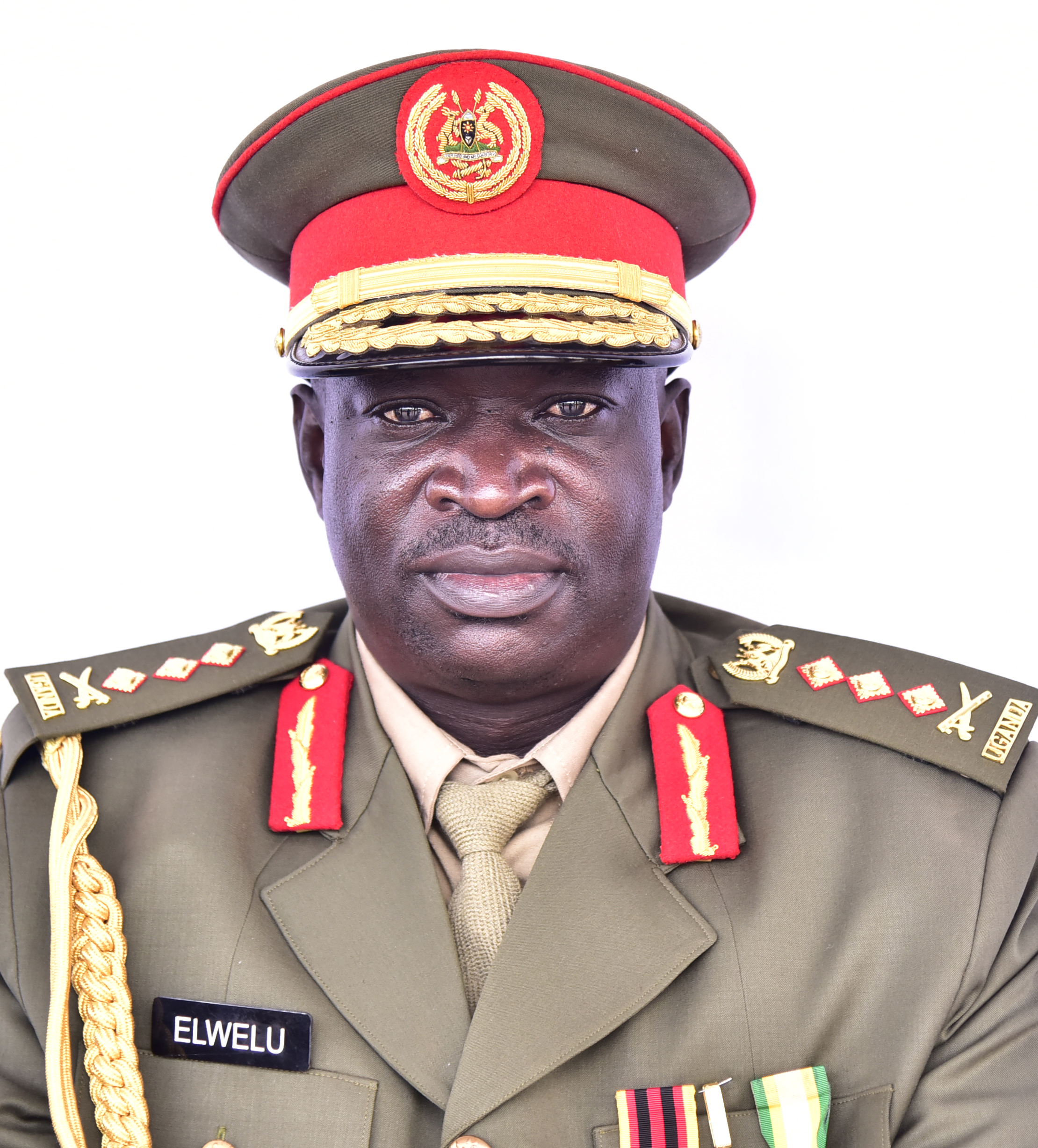
- Born: 12 June 1966 (age 60); Kumi District, Uganda
- Education: Tanzania Military Academy (Senior command and control course)
- Occupation: Military officer
- Years active: Since 1987
- Known for: Military matters
- Title: Commander of Land Forces; Uganda People's Defence Force

Peter Elwelu is a retired Lieutenant General in the Ugandan military, known formally as the Uganda People's Defence Force (UPDF). He was the Deputy Chief of the Defense Forces of the UPDF from 24 June 2021 until his retirement. Following his appointment on 9 January 2017, he served as the commander of the land forces, which is the third-highest position in the UPDF hierarchy. From June 2013 until January 2017, he was the commander of the UPDF 2nd division, based in Mbarara, the largest town in Uganda's Western Region. Elwelu is most known for the Kasese massacre in which, according to Human Rights Watch, 153 people were killed.

== Military career ==
Elwelu joined the Ugandan military in 1987. He first attended the Tanzania Military Academy in Monduli. Following that, he was posted to the military installation at Kabamba. In 1995, he was transferred to the Gaddafi military barracks at Jinja, at the Cadet Officer School.

He served as a commander within the UPDF when it intervened in Zaire and overthrew Mobutu Sese Seko, alongside the Rwandan military. He returned to Uganda in 1999 and was deployed to the Northern Region to fight Joseph Kony and his guerilla Lord's Resistance Army. During that tour, he survived being shot in the back.

When Uganda first sent troops to Somalia in 2007 under the African Union Mission to Somalia, Elwelu commanded the first Uganda military contingent. He received commendation from the UPDF chief of defence forces, General Katumba Wamala, for his role on that tour.

In June 2013, he was appointed commander of the 2nd UPDF Division based at Mbarara. Before that, he had served as the commander of the UPDF 3rd Division based at Moroto.

In November 2016, in his capacity as 2nd Division commander, Elwelu commanded the UPDF troops that overran the palace in Kasese of Charles Mumbere, the traditional ruler of the Rwenzururu. At least 153 people, including children, died during these clashes.

Major General Elwelu, in his capacity as the UPDF Land forces commander, made his first visit to UPDF troops in Somalia under AMISOM on Wednesday 22 March 2017. According to the spokesman of the Ugandan contingent in Somalia, the general's visit was to "check on the operational tempo, boost the morale of the troops and also update the troops on the situation in Uganda".

In February 2019, over 2,000 men and women in the UPDF received promotions. Peter Elwelu was one of those promoted from the rank of Major General to that of Lieutenant General.

In October 2026, UPDF commander Muhoozi Kainerugaba announced Elwelu's demotion to the rank of private and accused him of stockpiling weapons and organising activities against the government. On 2 November 2026, Elwelu was arrested on suspicion of involvement in subversion and destabilization efforts in Teso sub-region, with the military adding that he had been found with 15 guns, military fatigues, and two pick-up trucks in his possession.

== See also ==
- List of military schools in Uganda
