= Paul Lokech =

Ugandan general (1966–2021)

Major General Deputy Inspector General of Police Paul Lokech
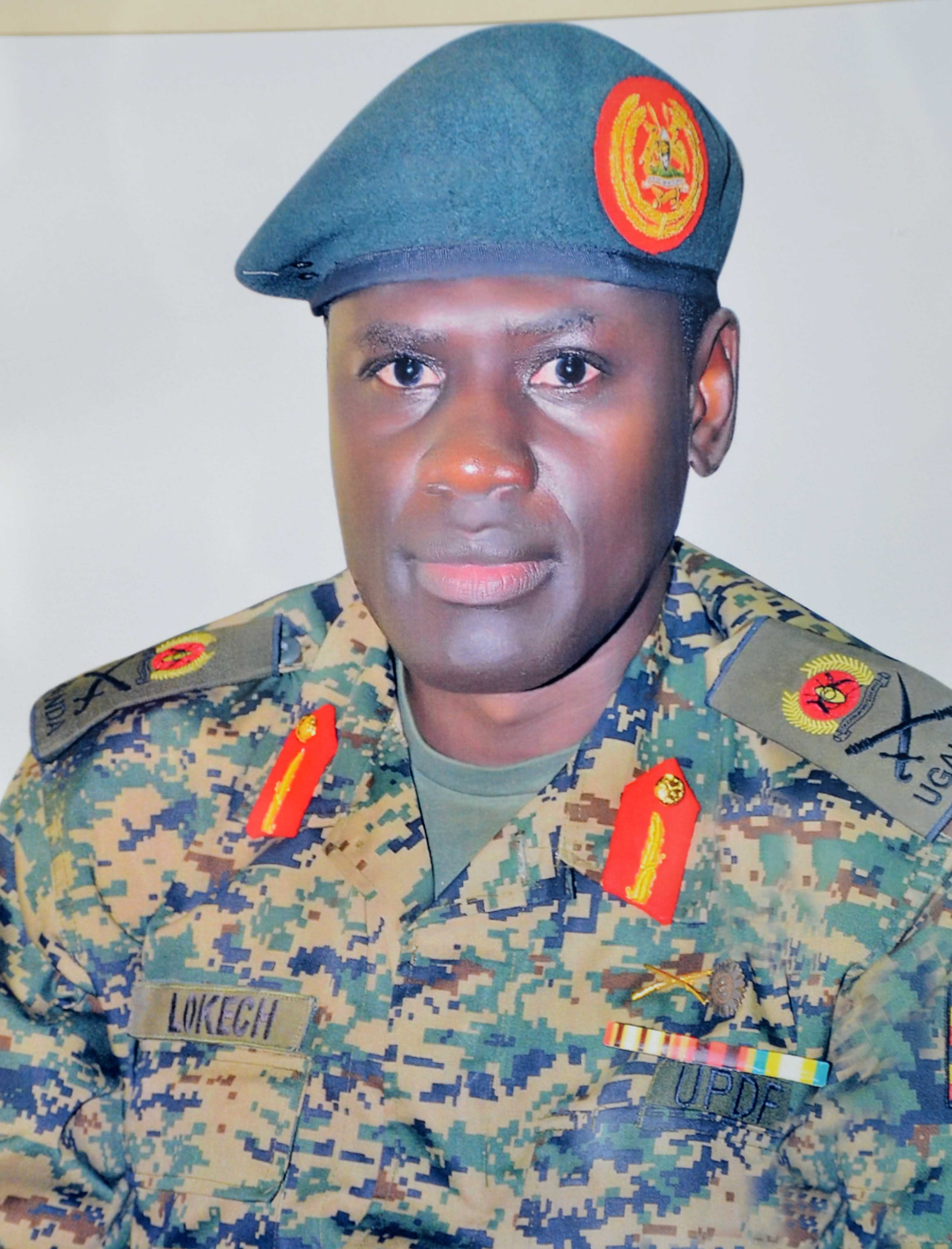
- Born: 1 January 1966; Pader District, Uganda
- Died: 21 August 2021 (aged 55); Kitikifumba, Uganda
- Occupation: Military officer
- Title: Deputy Inspector General of Uganda Police Force

Paul L'Okech (1 January 1966 – 21 August 2021) was a senior military officer at the rank of Lieutenant General in the Uganda People's Defence Forces (UPDF), who was appointed Deputy Inspector General of Police of the Uganda Police Force on 16 December 2020. Between November 2017 and December 2019, he served on special assignment "to monitor on behalf of the guarantors of the South Sudan peace process, the assembling, screening, demobilization and integration of the armed forces of South Sudan".

Before that, he served as Chief of Staff of the UPDF Air Force, from 11 July 2019 until 11 December 2019.

From December 2018 until July 2019, he was Commandant of Uganda Rapid Deployment Capability Centre (URDCC), in Jinja, in the Eastern Region of Uganda. He was appointed to that position in December 2018.

On 21 August 2021, he suffered a fatal, sudden, massive, bilateral pulmonary embolus and died at his home, in Kitikifumba, Kira Town, Wakiso District, in the Central Region of Uganda.

== Background ==
Lokech was born in Pader District, in the Acholi sub-region in the Northern Region of Uganda, circa 1966.

== Military career ==
His military career includes service in various leadership capacities, including two tours as the Commander of the Uganda contingent to Somalia, as part of the AMISOM peace-keeping force. The first tour was between May 2011 and 2012. His second Somalia rotation was from December 2017 until December 2018. During his first tour, Lokech commanded Battle Groups Eight and Nine, responsible for ejecting Al-Shabaab militants from Mogadishu in 2011.

Before his second tour in Somalia, he was the Commanding Officer of the Second UPDF Division, based at Makenke Barracks, in Mbarara, in the Western Region of Uganda. He has previously served as the Military Attaché at Uganda's Embassy to Russia, based in Moscow.

He has also served as part of Uganda's peace-keeping forces in South Sudan. He was part of Operation Safe Haven (OSH), a UPDF operation in the Democratic Republic of the Congo intended to neutralise the rebel Allied Democratic Forces (ADF).

== Other considerations ==
In February 2019, President Yoweri Museveni promoted over 2,000 men and women to various ranks in the UPDF. As part of that exercise, Paul Lokech was promoted from Brigadier to Major General. His name was inadvertently left off the original list, and the Uganda military apologized for that omission.

== Illness and death ==
According to newspaper reports, Lokesh suffered a fracture of his right ankle about 3 to 4 weeks before his death. He was managed as an outpatient, by his private orthopaedic surgeon. The affected ankle was put in a cast. He was scheduled to see his doctor on the morning of his death.

At autopsy, the team of pathologists found a large blood clot in one of the veins in the right calf, a condition known as deep venous thrombosis (DVT). Proceeding to the lungs, the pathologists found both pulmonary arteries blocked by massive blood clots. They concluded that the patient died from sudden, bilateral massive venous thromboembolism.

He was posthumously promoted to the rank of Lieutenant General.

== See also ==
- Fred Tolit
- Nakibus Lakara
- Sabiiti Muzeyi
