= Chief of Defence Forces (Uganda) =

Head of the armed forces of Uganda

Chief of the Uganda People's Defence Force
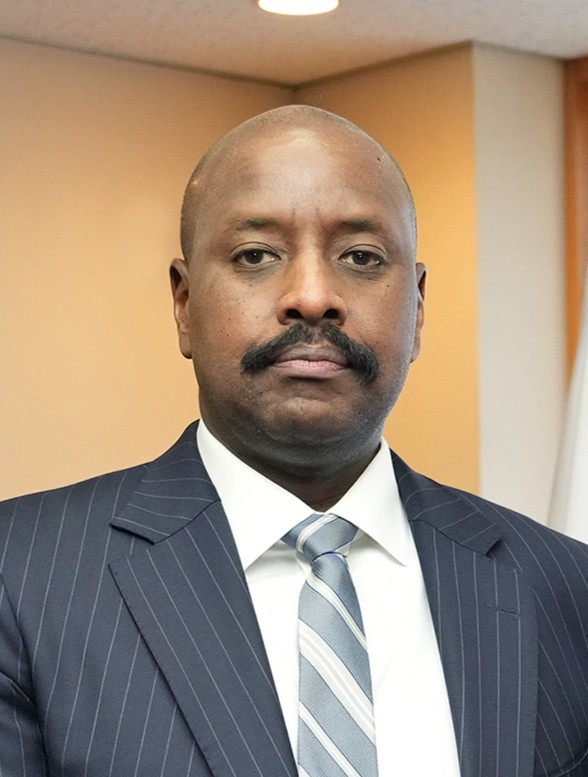
- Incumbent; General Muhoozi Kainerugaba since 22 March 2024
- Uganda Ministry of Defence and Veterans Affairs
- Reports to: Minister of Defence
- Appointer: President of Uganda
- Precursor: Commander of the NRA
- Formation: 1989
- First holder: Mugisha Muntu

The Chief of Defence Forces (CDF) is the professional head of the Uganda People's Defence Force (UPDF). The CDF is responsible for the administration and the operational control of the Ugandan military. The position was established after the National Resistance Army (NRA) was reconstituted as the UPDF, three years after the NRA's victory in the Ugandan Bush War in 1986. The current CDF is General Muhoozi Kainerugaba.

== List of Chiefs ==
=== Commander of the National Resistance Army ===
No.	Portrait	Commander of the NRA	Took office	Left office	Time in office	Ref.
1	Ahmmed Seguya	Major; Ahmmed Seguya (?–1983)	1981	1983 †	1–2 years	
2	Sam Magara	Lieutenant Colonel; Sam Magara (?–1984)	1983	1984 †	0–1 years	
3	Elly Tumwine	General; Elly Tumwine (1954–2022)	1984	1987	2–3 years	–
4	Salim Saleh	General; Salim Saleh (born 1960)	1987	1989	1–2 years	–

=== Chief of Defence Force ===
No.	Portrait	Chief of Defence Force	Took office	Left office	Time in office	Ref.
1	Mugisha Muntu	Major general Mugisha Muntu (born 1958)	1989	1998	8–9 years	–
2	Jeje Odongo	General; Jeje Odongo (born 1951)	1998	2001	2–3 years	–
3	James Kazini	Major general James Kazini (1957–2009)	2001	2003	1–2 years	
4	Aronda Nyakairima	General; Aronda Nyakairima (1959–2015)	2003	2013	9–10 years	
5	Katumba Wamala	General; Katumba Wamala (born 1956)	23 May 2013	9 January 2017	3 years, 7 months	
5	David Muhoozi	General; David Muhoozi (born 1965)	9 January 2017	24 June 2021	4 years, 5 months	
6	Wilson Mbadi	General; Wilson Mbadi (born 1962)	24 June 2021	22 March 2024	2 years, 8 months	
7	Muhoozi Kainerugaba	General; Muhoozi Kainerugaba (born 1974)	22 March 2024	Incumbent	2 years, 5 months	
