= Charles Angina =

Ugandan politician

Lieutenant General Charles Angina
- Born: 29 March 1962 (age 64); Bukedea County, Kumi District, Uganda (now Bukedea District)
- Occupations: Military Officer & Member of Parliament
- Years active: 1982–present
- Known for: Military Matters

Charles Angina (born 29 March 1962) is a lieutenant general in the Uganda People's Defense Force (UPDF). As of August 2021, he is awaiting assignment at the Uganda Ministry of Foreign Affairs. From January 2017 until July 2021, he served as the deputy chief coordinator of Operation Wealth Creation (OWC), a development program operated by the Ugandan military.

He previously served as the Deputy Chief of Defense Forces of Uganda, the second-highest military position within the UPDF. He was appointed to that position in May 2013, replacing General Ivan Koreta, who was appointed an ambassador.

== History ==
He was born in Bukedea County, Kumi District in present-day Bukedea District, Teso sub-region, in the Eastern Region of Uganda.

== Military training ==
Angina joined the UPDF in 1983. Following a one-year officer cadet course, he was commissioned in 1985. He attended several military courses, including:

1. National Defense Course, China in 1998

2. Command and General Staff Course (CGSC), in the United States in 2000

3. Course on Military and Media in a Democracy, at the University of Kansas in 2000

4. Joint Tactical Command Course, in China

5. Combined Platoon Commander Course, in North Korea.

== Military career ==
Early in his military career, he served as an aide de camp. He went on to serve as an intelligence officer, platoon commander, operational intelligence officer Combined Mobile Forces and as 4th Division intelligence officer. From there, he served as operations coordinator 2nd Division, then as the 305th Brigade commander and as commander of the 2nd Division.

During the Ituri conflict, Angina served as the sector commander of the Ituri region in the Democratic Republic of the Congo (DRC). He then became sector commander Basankusu during Operation Safe Haven in the DRC.

Thereafter, he served as a military adviser in Tanzania. He then transferred to the Embassy of Uganda in Washington, D. C. as the military attaché. He was then appointed chairman of the General Court Martial of the UPDF. He also has served as chief of staff of land forces in the UPDF.

== Other responsibilities ==
He was a Member of Parliament, representing the UPDF in the 9th Parliament (2011 -2016). He served as a member of the parliamentary committee on privileges and discipline.

== See also ==
- Crispus Kiyonga
- David Muhoozi
- Muhoozi Kainerugaba
- Samuel Turyagyenda
- Leopold Kyanda
- Wilson Mbadi
- Yoweri Museveni

Military offices
Preceded by Ivan Koreta; As Deputy Chief of Defence Forces of Uganda	Deputy Chief of Defence Forces of Uganda; 2013 - 2017	Succeeded by Wilson Mbadi; As Deputy Chief of Defence Forces of Uganda
Preceded by Unknown; As Chief of Staff Land Forces	Chief of Staff Land Forces of Uganda; 2005 - 2013	Succeeded by Leopold Kyanda; As Chief of Staff Land Forces
