= Legal practice in Uganda =

Legal practice in Uganda follows a system developed largely based on English common law, with respect given to Ugandan customary law where it does not conflict with statutory law.

== History ==
In the precolonial period, the region incorporating what is now called 'Uganda' was subject to decentralised rule by a number of political entities with their own legal systems governing administration and commerce. In 1888 the Imperial British East Africa Company took control of Uganda under a system of company rule which would last until 1894, when the IBEAC ceded control and administration of Uganda directly to the British state, which then governed it as the Protectorate of Uganda, subject directly to British law.

Upon its independence, Uganda (influenced by its colonial history) adopted a constitution based on English common law which established itself as the supreme legal authority.

== Judiciary ==
Article 128 of the Ugandan constitution provides for the establishment of an independent judiciary free from the control or interference of any person or authority.

The judiciary is constitutionally mandated to provide civil and criminal dispute resolution, interpret and defend the law and constitution, promote human rights and the rule of law, and provide all other necessary services for the operation of Uganda's legal system.

All new legislature is published by the judiciary in the weekly Uganda Gazette.

=== Court structure ===
Legal matters are handled by the judiciary through a hierarchical court structure. The Supreme Court is the highest judicial body, followed by the Court of Appeal, the High Court, and lastly the subordinate courts such as Qadhis' courts for dealing with matters of matrimony and inheritance.

== Customary law ==
The Ugandan legal system makes an effort to respect the traditional customary laws of the various social groups in Uganda. The Judicature Act of Uganda states "Nothing in this Act shall deprive [...] any person of the benefit of, any existing custom, which is not repugnant to natural justice, equity and good conscience and not incompatible either directly or by necessary implication with any written law." Legal precedence in Uganda has determined that in order for a custom to stand as customary law, it must be reasonable, it must be followed continuously and have "immemorial antiquity," and it must be "certain".

== See also ==
- List of law firms in Uganda
- Law Development Centre
- Uganda Law Society
