= John Mugume =

Lieutenant General John Mugume Chaaga
- Born: Uganda
- Citizenship: Uganda
- Occupation: Military Officer
- Years active: 1981–present
- Known for: Military Matters

Lieutenant General John Mugume is a senior Ugandan military officer. He currently serves as the General Manager of Defence Forces Shop Limited, the duty-free commissary of the UPDF.

== Background ==
He was born in the Western Region of Uganda. He was one of the first 100 recruits into the National Resistance Army. His military number in RO/00087, being the 87th recruit.

== Military career ==
Among the roles he has served in, are the following:

- As General Manager of Defence Forces Shop, effective March 2008, at the rank of Brigadier.
- As Chief of Military Police, prior to 2008.
- As Commander of the 5th Division of the UPDF, prior to 2008.
- As Uganda's Military Attaché in Tanzania, prior to 2008.

In February 2019, in a promotions exercise involving over 2,000 men and women of the UPDF, he was promoted from the rank of Major General, to that of Lieutenant General.

== See also ==
- Uganda People's Defence Forces
