= James Mugira =

Ugandan general, lawyer and corporate executive (born 1964)

Lieutenant General James Mugira
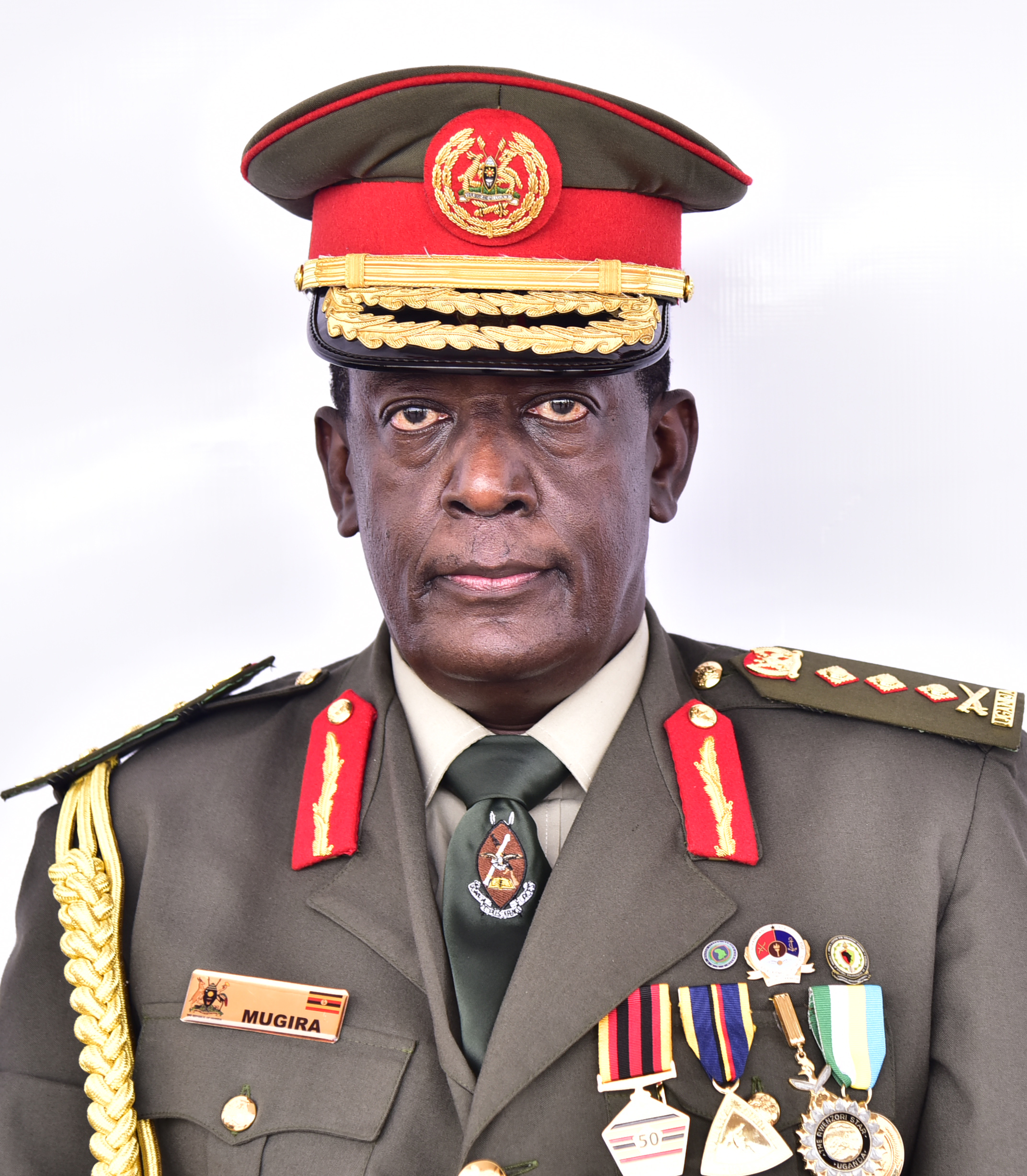
- Born: 24 January 1964 (age 62); Uganda
- Education: Makerere University; Law Development Centre; University of Manchester; University of Ghana
- Occupations: Military officer, lawyer
- Years active: 1986 – present
- Title: Managing Director & CEO; National Enterprise Corporation
- Spouse: Jackie Mugira

James Mugira is a lieutenant general in the Ugandan army. He is the managing director and chief executive officer of the National Enterprise Corporation (NEC), the business arm of the Uganda People's Defence Force (UPDF). He was appointed to that position in April 2015. From 2008 until 2011, at the rank of brigadier, he served as the director general of the Chieftaincy of Military Intelligence, a division of the UPDF. Before that, he served as the commanding officer of the UPDF Armored Brigade, based in Masaka.

== Background and education ==
He was born in the Western Region of Uganda circa 1964. He studied law at Makerere University, graduating with a Bachelor of Laws degree. He then obtained a Diploma in Legal Practice from the Law Development Centre. His Master of Laws degree was obtained from the University of Manchester. He also holds a Master of Arts in international affairs from the University of Ghana.

== Military career ==
In March 2016, as part of the plan to revitalize the NEC, the president of Uganda appointed two one-star generals as deputies to Mugira. In February 2019, Mugira was promoted from the rank of Major General to that of Lieutenant General, in a promotions exercise that involved over 2,000 troops.

== Family ==
Mugira was born to parents Marjorie and George Kanguhangire. He has 9 siblings. Mugira is married to Jackie Bayonga Mugira. They have four children.

== See also ==
- Nakibus Lakara
- David Muhoozi
- Muhoozi Kainerugaba
- Wilson Mbadi
