= Fredrick Mugisha =

Ugandan Army officer

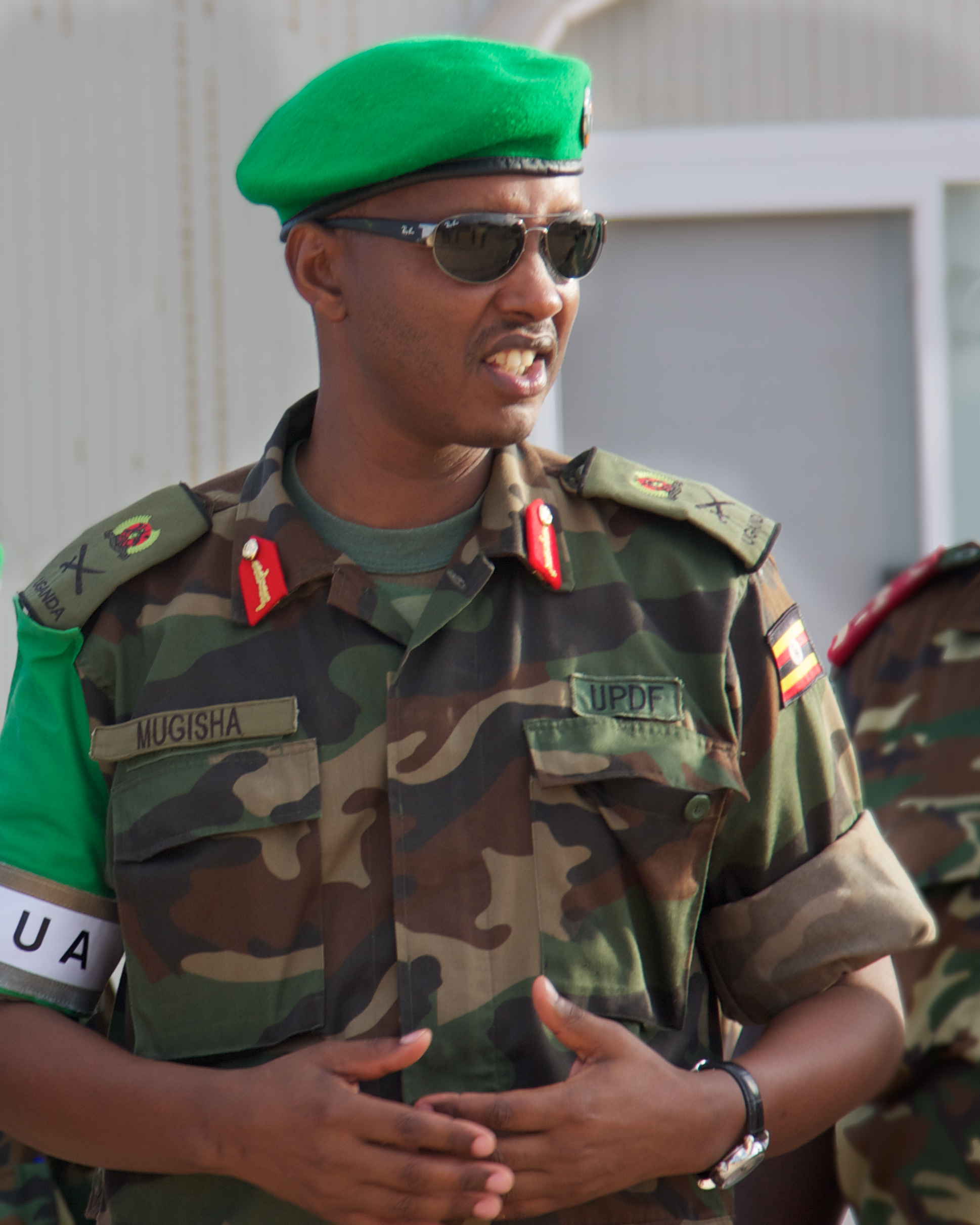
- Born: 1963 (age 62–63); Western Uganda
- Military career
- Allegiance: Uganda
- Branch: National Resistance Army; Uganda People's Defence Force
- Service years: 1984-2022
- Rank: Major general
- Commands: Commander of AMISOM; Artillery Division UPDF
- Conflicts: Ugandan Bush War: Battle of Kembogo; Battle of Kampala; Somali Civil War (2009–present): Battle of Mogadishu (2010–2011)

Major General Fredrick Mugisha is a senior military officer in the Uganda People's Defence Force. He assumed command over AMISOM as the fourth commander on 15 June 2011.

== Biography ==
Mugisha was born in 1963 in Western Uganda. In his youth, he joined the National Resistance Army, the armed wing of the National Resistance Movement (NRM) rebel movement which took part in the Ugandan Bush War. He rose to become an officer in the NRA's Mobile Brigade, serving under Salim Saleh. In 1985, Mugisha fought in the Battle of Kembogo. In early 1986, he was one of the officers who took part in the NRA's assault on the Ugandan capital Kampala.

After the NRM/NRA's victory in the Ugandan Bush War, Mugisha continued to serve in the new Ugandan national military. From 1987 to May 1988, he served as communications officer of a Battalion at the provisional rank of APC. He attended the Officer Cadet Course at Simferopol Academy in the former Soviet Union, from 1988 to 1989. From 1990 to 1995, Mugisha served as Security and Combat Intelligence officer at the rank of lieutenant. From 1995 to 1997, he served as second in command of Artillery and Air Defense at the rank of captain. He then attended the Company Commander Course at Monduli Military Academy in Tanzania, in 1997. From 1997 to 1998, Mugisha was the Intelligence and Security officer of the 1st Army Division at the rank of major. From 1999 to 2000, he was the 2nd Division Intelligence and Security officer at the rank of major. In 2000, he attended the Platoon Commander Course at the Sierra Vista Military Academy in Arizona, United States.

From 2000 to 2001, Mugisha served as Director Combat Intelligence and Security at the rank of major. From March 2001 to December 2001, he was Deputy Chief of Military Intelligence and Security at the rank of lieutenant colonel. From 2002 to 2004, he was Division Operations and Training officer at an artillery division, at the rank of colonel. From 2003 until 2004, he attended the Army High Command Course at Nanjing Army Command College in China. He then attended the Africa Strategic Course at Nasser Military Academy in Egypt, in 2005. He attended the Senior Command and Staff Course at the Army War College at Mhow, Madhya Pradesh, India, in 2006. In 2008, he attended the National Defense College, in South Africa. From 2005 to 2011, he was also the commander of the artillery division, stationed at Masindi, at the rank of brigadier.

He was promoted from brigadier to major general and appointed commander of AMISOM in August 2011. In this role, he was posted to Mogadishu, Somalia. He served in this position until 2012, when he became joint chief of staff of the Uganda People's Defence Forces.

In May 2013, he was replaced as joint chief of staff by Major General Wilson Mbadi and assigned to the position of commandant of the newly established National Counter Terrorism Center.

Mugisha served as the top diplomat of Uganda in China from 2021 to 2023. In 2022, he retired from the military.

He holds a master's in Management of Peace and Security on African Continent from Addis Ababa University.

== See also ==
- African Union Mission to Somalia
