= Samuel Turyagyenda =

Ugandan military commander

- Born: 1952 (age 73–74); Rukungiri District, Uganda
- Education: Flight School in USSR (Diploma in Commercial Civil Aviation); Flight School in Libya (Helicopter Conversion Course); Maxwell Air Force Base (Air Command and Staff Course); Bell Helicopter Training College (Bell Helicopter Conversion Course)
- Occupations: Police officer; military officer; aircraft pilot
- Years active: 1973–2019
- Title: Commander of UPDF Air Force
- Spouse: Annie Turyagyenda (née Kyomugisha)

Samuel Turyagyenda is a Ugandan police officer, professional pilot and army officer. He served as the commander of the Air Force in the Uganda People's Defence Force (UPDF). He was appointed to that position in May 2013, having been Deputy Commander of the Uganda Air Force, immediately prior to his appointment. He retired in July 2019.

== Background and training ==
Samuel Turyagyenda was born in Rukungiri District in 1952. From 1973 until 1976, he studied in the former Soviet Union, graduating with a Diploma in Commercial Civil Aviation, while being a member of the Uganda Police Force. In 1986, he studied in Libya, taking a Conversion Course on MI-8/MI-17 helicopters. He also attended the Air Command and Staff Course at Maxwell Air Force Base, in Montgomery, Alabama, United States. Later, he undertook a refresher helicopter course in Kazan, Russia. He also attended a course on Commercial Rotorcraft in the United States of America, in 1997. Later he attended a Conversion/Transition Course at Bell Helicopter Training College in Hurst, Texas, United States.

== Military career ==
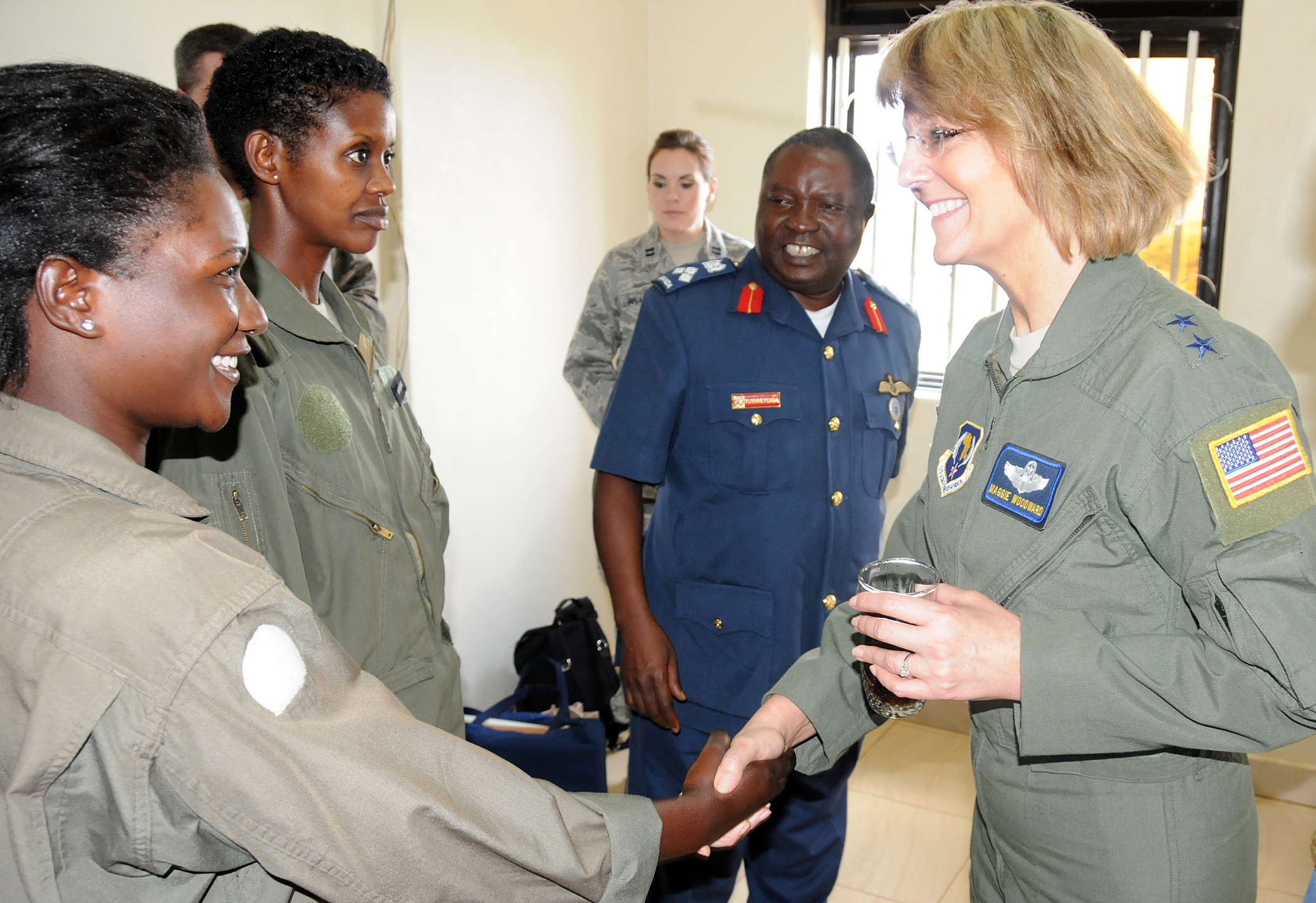
Turyagyenda (center) at Entebbe Air Base

Samuel Turyagyenda worked as a policeman, in the Uganda Police Force, from 1973 until 1985. In 1986, he transitioned into the National Resistance Army. He has served as the Squadron Commander of the MI-17 Helicopters, in the Uganda People's Defence Forces. He then became Acting Director of the Uganda Air Force. He was the Deputy Commander of Air Force at the rank of brigadier, immediately prior to his promotion to major general and appointment to his current position as Commander of the UPDF Air Force and Chief Pilot of the Presidential Helicopter.

== Personal life ==
He is married with six children. He is of the Christian faith.

== See also ==
- UPDF
- Wilson Mbadi
- Katumba Wamala
- David Muhoozi
- Muhoozi Kainerugaba
- Yoweri Museveni
