= Maguy Kabamba =

Maguy (Margaret) Rashidi Kabamba (born 3 August 1960) is a writer and translator from the Democratic Republic of the Congo. She has a B.A. specializing in Translation from York University, Toronto, Canada and a M.A. with major French, minor Spanish from Saint-Louis University, St. Louis, MO. Her novel La Dette coloniale (The Colonial Debt) emerged in 1995. The book takes a critical look at the belief many Africans have that a better life can be found in Europe. Its title refers to a philosophy that acquisition of goods and money by any means (i.e. criminality) is a legitimate refund or entitlement. The phrase has been used frequently by Congolese leaders. Her second book is titled La réponse, another novel where she paints a picture of the current Congolese society.

During the 2007-2008 school year, she worked as a French I-III teacher at Dulles High School (Sugar Land, Texas).

== Works ==
- La dette coloniale: roman. Montréal: Humanitas, 1995.
- La réponse: roman. Cork: BookBaby, 2013.
