= Kabamba =

Kabamba is both a surname and a given name. Notable people with the name include:

Surname:

- Edouard Kabamba (born 1987), Belgian footballer
- Maguy Kabamba (born 1960), Democratic Republic of the Congo writer and translator
- Nicke Kabamba (born 1993), English footballer

Given name:

- Kabamba Floors (born 1980), South African rugby union player
- Kabamba Musasa (born 1982), Democratic Republic of the Congo footballer

Places

- Kabamba, Uganda, a settlement in Mubende District, Central Uganda
