= Stephen Kiggundu =

Ugandan general (1977–2024)

Brigadier General Stephen Kiggundu
- Born: 3 April 1977; Entebbe, Uganda
- Died: March 31, 2024 (aged 46); Entebbe, Uganda
- Citizenship: Uganda
- Occupations: Military pilot; military flight instructor; paratrooper; military commander
- Years active: 1999–2024
- Title: Former Deputy Commander of UPDF Air Force

Stephen Kiggundu (3 April 1977 – 31 March 2024), was a Ugandan military officer, military pilot, paratrooper, military flight instructor and military commander in the Uganda People's Defence Force. At the time of his death, he was the Deputy Commander of the UPDF Air Force. He served in that role from September 2022 until March 2024.

== Early life and education ==
He was born on 3 April 1977, in the neighborhood called "Bugonga", in the City of Entebbe, in Wakiso District. He attended Ugandan primary and secondary schools. He was admitted to university, graduating with a bachelor's degree in information and communications technology (ICT).

== Military training ==
He joined the UPDF on 27 July 1999. He attended boot camp that lasted nine months. He was then selected for training as a military pilot. In 2000, he was sent to Israel to train as a cadet pilot on the MIG-21 fighter aircraft. He excelled in his pilot training.

Later, he returned to Israel to train as a paratrooper. He graduated as one of the first paratroopers under the National Resistance Movement (NRM) regime. He was then sent to the Czech Republic to train as a pilot on the Aero L-39 Albatros aircraft. While there, he was certified as a military pilot instructor on the L-39 Albatros equipment.

He was subsequently sent to Ukraine to study as a military flight instructor on the MIG-21 aircraft. He graduated at the top of his class. He was the first Ugandan pilot to be certified to fly the Su-30MK, purchased by Uganda in 2012.

He attended a command course at the Air Command and Staff College at Maxwell Air Force Base in Montgomery, Alabama, United States and undertook another course at a Chinese military college.

== Military career ==
He served in various roles in the UPDF Air Force, primarily as a flight instructor on both the L-39 Albatros and the MIG-21 equipment. In 2008 he flew aerial missions in the war against Joseph Kony and the Lord's Resistance Army in the Garamba National Forest in the Democratic Republic of the Congo. He also fought in the war against the Allied Democratic Front terrorist group in Western Uganda and Eastern DR Congo.

For a period, at the level of Lieutenant Colonel, he served as the commander of the Soroti Air Force Wing. He also served as the squadron commander of the Sukhoi Su-30MK2 squadron. In 2022, president Yoweri Museveni promoted him from Lieutenant Colonel to Brigadier General, skipping the rank of Colonel. He was then appointed Deputy Commander of UPDF Air Force, deputizing Lieutenant General Charles Okidi.

== Death ==
Brigadier Kiggundu was electrocuted while taking a shower in the bathroom of his official residence in the city of Entebbe, on the evening of Sunday 31 March 2024, three days shy of his 47th birthday. The Uganda military launched an investigation into the circumstances of his death. He was buried on 4 April 2024 at his ancestral home, in Kijambura Cell, Nyangahya Division, Kikwanana Ward in Masindi District, Bunyoro sub-region, in Uganda's Western Region.

== See also ==
- Charles Lutaaya
- Charles Okidi
- UPDF
- Wakiso District
