= National Enterprise Corporation =

- Type: Government / military parastatal
- Industry: Manufacturing, pharmaceuticals, construction and agribusiness
- Founded: 1989
- Headquarters: Plot 2 Muwesi Road, Bugoloobi, Kampala, Uganda
- Key people: Joram Mugume (chairperson); James Mugira managing director Maj Gen Innocent Oula (deputy managing director)
- Products: Construction, architectural, structural and civil engineering works, renovation and maintenance of estate, upgrade of AK-47 rifle, cartridge production, production of high level bulletproof vests and helmets, support services on utilisation of explosives, cattle fattening for beef export, supply of quality breeding Bulls to Ugandan farmers and production of natural mineral water
- Subsidiaries: Major subsidiaries
- Website: nec.go.ug

The National Enterprise Corporation (NEC) is a state-owned corporation in Uganda. It is the commercial arm of the Uganda People's Defence Force. NEC was established in 1989 by an act of the Parliament of Uganda. Its investments and activities include agriculture, manufacturing, healthcare, services, and defense industry projects and companies.

== Location ==
The headquarters of NEC are located at Plot 2, Muwesi Road, Bugolobi, Kampala, the capital and largest city of Uganda. For the coordinates see this source:

== Organization and operations ==
=== Major subsidiaries ===
The major subsidiaries of NEC include the following:

- NEC Construction Works and Engineering Limited - Involved in construction and engineering work for the military and civilian sectors and including the construction of barracks and civilian houses. NEC Construction is constructing the factory of Kiira Motors Corporation, in Wairaka, Jinja, in Uganda's Eastern Region.
- Luwero Industries Limited - Manufactures and repairs armored vehicles, electronic equipment, ordnance, and agricultural equipment. In June 2021, Luweero Industries began manufacturing medical oxygen for use in public and private medical institutions in Uganda.
- NEC Agro SMC Limited
- NEC Uzima Limited
- NEC Security SMC Limited
- NEC Farm Limited
- NEC Pharmaceuticals Limited (being revamped)
- NEC T6 Industrial and Business Park

=== Joint ventures/partnerships ===
The following are joint ventures between NEC and non-Ugandan entities.

- UgIran Company Limited - Founded in 2008 in Kampala to manufacture and assemble tractors using licensed Massey Ferguson designs. These would be built from Complete Knocked-Down kits (CKD) delivered from ITMCO's Iranian factories. UgIran is a joint venture between Iran Tractor Manufacturing Company (ITMCO) (60 percent) and NEC (40 percent).
- Kyoga Dynamics Limited
- Pro-Helit International Services Limited
- Egypt-Uganda Joint Model Farm Project
- NEC-Streit Limited
- NEC-Meat and Beans Processing Limited
- NEC Elsewedy Limited
- NEC MMP Limited
- NEC-WATU Automobile (U) Limited

== Governance ==
As of March 2018, the company is governed by a 13-person board of directors, appointed by the Uganda Ministry of Defence and Veterans Affairs. The chairman of the board is General Joram Mugume. The board members include:

- Gen Joram Mugume: chairman
- Prof Charles Kwesiga: vice chairman
- Lt Gen Joseph Musanyifu
- Lt Gen Charles Otema AWany
- Maj Gen Geoffery Tumusiime Kastigazi
- Maj Gen Leopold Kyanda
- Brig Peter Chandia
- Francis Nyabirano Kahirita
- Issac Musasizi
- Dr Anna Rose Ademun Okurut
- Dr Joshua Mutambi
- Hannington Ashaba
- Lt Gen James Mugira

== Management ==
The chief executive officer of the company is Lieutenant General James Mugira, since 2015. He is deputized by Maj Gen Innocent Oula.

== See also ==
- Ministry of Defence (Uganda)
