= Charles Lutaaya =

Ugandan military officer

Lieutenant General Charles Lutaaya
- Born: Uganda
- Occupation: Military Officer
- Years active: 1986 – present
- Known for: Military Matters
- Title: Commander of UPDF Air Force

Lieutenant General Charles Lwanga Lutaaya, is a senior Ugandan military officer in the Uganda People's Defence Forces (UPDF). He is a presidential advisor on matters of Airforce. Before that, he was the Commander of the UPDF Air Force after having served as Deputy Commander of the UPDF Air Force.

== Early life and education ==
He was born in Uganda's Central Region. In 2013, at the rank of colonel, Lutaaya attended a Senior Air Staff and Command Course in the United States.

== Work history ==
In 2012, Charles Lutaaya, at the rank of lieutenant colonel, served as a member of the Commission of Inquiry into the crash of three UPDF Air Force helicopters into Mount Kenya, en route to Somalia, as part of the AMISOM mission. The crash led to the death of seven UPDF personnel and the loss of three Mi-17 aircraft. The commission was chaired by General Salim Saleh. At the end of that inquiry, Lutaaya was promoted to the rank of full colonel. In October 2012, at the rank of colonel, he was appointed to serve as the Chief of Staff of the UPDF Air Force. In July 2015, at the rank of colonel, he served as the deputy commander of the UPDF Air Force. In May 2016, he was promoted to the rank of Brigadier. In January 2017, he was promoted to the rank of Major General and appointed Commander of the UPDF Air Force.

In February 2019, he was promoted from the rank of Major General to that of Lieutenant General, in a promotions exercise that involved over 2,000 UPDF troops.

== See also ==
- Samuel Turyagyenda
- Stephen Kiggundu
- Sam Kavuma
- Gavas Mugyenyi
- Ugandan Military Schools
