= Wilson Mbadi =

Ugandan general

Wilson Mbasu Mbadi
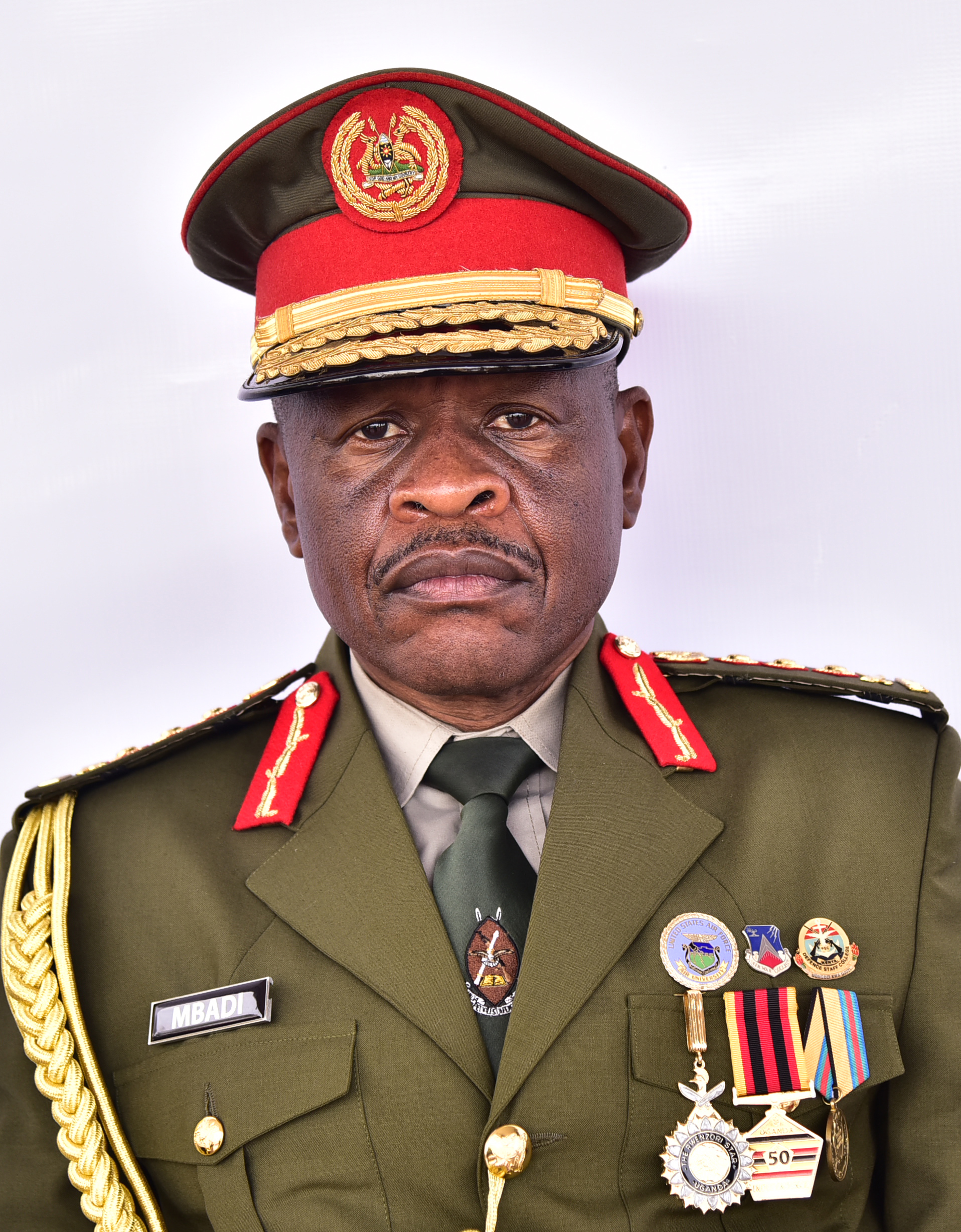
- Born: 6 June 1962 (age 64); Kasese District, Uganda
- Citizenship: Uganda
- Education: Air War College (Masters in Strategic Studies); University of Nairobi (Diploma in Strategic Studies)
- Occupation: Military officer
- Years active: 1986 – present
- Known for: Chief of Defense Forces of the UPDF

General Wilson Mbasu Mbadi is a senior military officer in the Uganda People's Defence Forces (UPDF) and the Minister of State for trade, industry and cooperatives. He served as the Chief of Defense Forces, the highest position in Uganda's military, from June 2021 until March 2024, having replaced General David Muhoozi, who was appointed State Minister of Internal Affairs.

Previously, from January 2017 until June 2021, at the rank of Lieutenant General, he served as the Deputy Chief of Defense Forces, replacing Lieutenant General Charles Angina, who became Deputy Commander of Operation Wealth Creation. Immediately prior to that, from May 2013 until January 2017, he served as the Joint Chief of Staff of the UPDF, where he was replaced by Major General Joseph Musanyufu.

== Background ==
He was born on 6 June 1962 in Kasese District.

== Military education ==
Wilson Mbadi joined the Uganda military in 1986. In 1991, he was commissioned, following the completion of a one-year Officer Cadet course at Royal Military Academy Sandhurst, in the United Kingdom. While at Sandhurst, he graduated at the top of his class. In 1992, he attended the Platoon Commander's Course at the Uganda School of Infantry, at that time located in Jinja. In 1994, he attended the Uganda Junior Staff College, also at Jinja.

In 1998, Mbadi attended the Mobile International Defence Management Course, in Lusaka, Zambia. Also in 1998, he attended the Company Command Course in Tanzania. In 2001, he attended the Combat Group Command Course at Armored Corps Center and School, in Ahmadnagar, India. In 2004, he attended the Senior Command and Staff Course at National Defence College, Kenya (NDCK). Also in 2004, Wilson Mbadi completed the Peace Support Operations Course (PSTC) at Karen, Kenya.

In 2005, he completed a Diploma course in Strategic Studies at the University of Nairobi. In 2007, he graduated with a master's degree in Strategic Studies from the Air War College at Maxwell Air Force Base in Alabama, United States of America.

== Military career ==
From 1987 to 1989, he served as a Junior Non-commissioned Instructor at Kaweweta and Kabamba Recruit Training Schools. In 1991, he was the Officer in Charge of Career Planning. He then served as the Director of Supplies in 1997/98 and as the Armoured Brigade Logistics Officer and Brigade Administrative Officer in 1999 and 2000, respectively. In 2001, he served as the Directing Staff, at the Uganda Junior Staff College in Jinja before becoming 503 Infantry Brigade Operations and Training officer in 2001/2002. Between 2002 and 2003, he served as the Armoured Brigade Operations and Training Officer before commanding the Armoured Brigade, in an acting capacity. In 2005, the took full command of the 507 Brigade before becoming the Principal Air Staff Officer (Personnel and Administration) at Uganda Peoples Defence Air Force HQs in 2006. In 2007, he became Aide-de-Camp (ADC) to the President of Uganda, serving in that capacity until December 2012 when he was appointed Commander of the 4th Infantry Division of UPDF, based in Gulu. In May 2013, he was appointed Joint Chief of Staff of the UPDF.

== Other responsibilities ==
General Wilson Mbadi was also the Inspector General of UPDF and Chairman of UPDF Medals Committee, UPDF Dress Committee, Defence Forces Duty free Shop Board of Directors, Senior Command and Staff College Control Board, Uganda National Defence College Steering Committee, MoDVA Projects Preparation Committee and a member of Kyoga Dynamics Board of Directors. Furthermore, Gen. Mbadi was a member of the Standard Gauge Railway Board of Directors (2015–2018). He also served as the Chairman of Uganda Military Engineering College and a member of the board of directors of the National Enterprise Corporation Limited (2013–2016). He is married with children. He is of the Christian faith.

== See also ==
- UPDF
- Crispus Kiyonga
- Katumba Wamala
- David Muhoozi
- Muhoozi Kainerugaba
- Samuel Turyagyenda

Military offices
| Preceded by David Muhoozi; As Chief of Defense Forces | Chief of Defense Forces of the UPDF; 2021 - 2024 | Succeeded by Muhoozi Kainerugaba; As Chief of Defense Forces of the UPDF |

Military offices
| Preceded by Charles Angina; As Deputy Chief of Defense Forces | Deputy Chief of Defense Forces of the UPDF; 2017 - 2021 | Succeeded by Peter Elwelu; As Deputy Chief of Defense Forces of the UPDF |

Military offices
| Preceded by Fredrick Mugisha; As Joint Chief of Staff of the UPDF | Joint Chief of Staff of the UPDF; 2013 - 2017 | Succeeded by Joseph Musanyufu; As Joint Chief of Staff of the UPDF |
