= Uganda Military Academy =

Military school in Uganda

- near Kabamba, Mubende District in Uganda

Site information
- Type: Military School
- Owner: Uganda People's Defence Force
- Controlled by: UPDF
- Open to the public: No

Location
- Location of Uganda Military Academy, Kabamba, Mubende District, Uganda.
- Coordinates: 00°15′00″N 31°11′06″E

Site history
- Built: 2007
- Built by: Uganda People's Defence Force Engineers
- In use: Since 2007
- Fate: Intact, Operational

Garrison information
- Current commander: Colonel Wycliff Keita
- Past commanders: General Jeje Odongo, Lieutenant General Andrew Gutti, Brigadier Clovis Kalyebara

Airfield information
- Elevation: 1,200 m (3,937 ft) AMSL

The Uganda Military Academy, is a military academy in Uganda, East Africa. Traditionally, graduates of the Military Academy are commissioned as officers in the Uganda People's Defence Force. Other African countries also send their cadets to the academy for training.

== Location ==
The military academy is located in the town of Kabamba, approximately 49 kilometres (30 mi), by road, southwest of the town of Mubende, in Mubende District, in the Central Region of Uganda. Kabamba is located approximately 200 kilometres (124 mi), west of Kampala, the capital of Uganda and the country's largest city. The coordinates of Kabamba are: 0°15'00.0"N, 31°11'06.0"E (Latitude:0.2500; Longitude:31.1850).

== History ==
The academy was formed in 2007 by merging the Cadet Officer School, which was originally housed at Jinja, with the Uganda School of Infantry, originally housed at Kabamba. Past Commandants at the institution have included Lieutenant General Andrew Gutti, Major General Chachu Neutral, and the late Brigadier Clovis Kalyebara. Mathew Gureme and Brigadier Dick Olum have each served as Chief Instructors at the Academy.

== Mission ==
The Military Academy aims to prepare and qualify cadets to become combat officers capable of commanding their units during times of peace and war, under various psychological, physical and morale conditions. Through scientific and cultural training that enables them to efficiently adapt to the advances in military science, cadets are schooled to maintain the highest level of combat efficiency and morale within their units. The school has plans to offer university-level degree courses in defence and security studies. Beginning in 2017, the academy began offering a three-year course leading to the award of a Bachelor of Arts degree in Defence and Security Matters.

== See also ==
- National Defence College, Uganda
- National Resistance Army
- Crispus Kiyonga
- Jeje Odongo
- UG Military Schools
- List of Universities in Uganda
