= Leopold Kyanda =

Ugandan general

Major General Leopold Kyanda
- Born: 1 January 1970 (age 56); Uganda
- Occupation: Military officer
- Years active: 1993 – present
- Known for: Military affairs
- Title: Joint Chief of Staff of the Uganda People's Defence Force

Leopold Eric Kyanda (born 1 January 1970), is a Major General in the Uganda People's Defence Force (UPDF). Effective 24 June 2021, he serves as the Joint Chief of Staff of the UPDF. He replaced Lieutenant General Joseph Musanyufu who was redeployed to the civil service.

Before that, Kyanda was the Chief of Staff of the Land Forces in the UPDF, replacing Major General Charles Angina, who was promoted to Lieutenant General and appointed Deputy Chief of Defence Forces of Uganda (DCDF). inspector General of Police

== Military career ==
Leo Kyanda was born on 1 January 1970. Ugandan press reports indicate that in 1994, he was an Aide de Camp to General Ivan Koreta, at that time, a Brigadier and was also his driver in that year. He later joined the then Presidential Guard Brigade (PGB), which today is part of the Special Forces Group (SFG). He rose in its ranks and eventually became the Commander of the PGB. Following that, he became the Commandant of the Chieftaincy of Military Intelligence (CMI). From there, he was assigned to the Ugandan Embassy in Washington, D.C., as the Military Attaché, serving in that capacity for two years. On his return to Uganda, he was appointed Chief of Personnel and Administration in the UPDF. From there, he was promoted to the rank of brigadier and assigned the post of Chief of Staff of Land Forces of Uganda. In December 2017, Kyanda completed a military course from the National Defence College in India.

In February 2019 he was promoted from the rank of Brigadier to that of Major General, as a part of a promotions exercise involving over 2,000 men and women of the UPDF.

== Personal life ==
He is married to Judy Rugasira Kyanda, the country manager for Knight Frank Uganda Ltd. They have two daughters.

== Awards ==
Pearl of Africa Lifetime Achievement Award (PALITA AWARD)-2015.

== See also ==
- Ivan Koreta
- Muhoozi Kainerugaba
- Wilson Mbadi
- Hudson Mukasa

Military offices
| Preceded by Joseph Musanyufu; As Joint Chief of Staff of UPDF | Joint Chief of Staff of UPDF; 2021 – present | Succeeded by Incumbent; As Joint Chief of Staff of UPDF |

Military offices
| Preceded by Charles Angina; As Chief of Staff Land Forces | Chief of Staff Land Forces of Uganda; 2013 – 2021 | Succeeded by Vacant; As Chief of Staff Land Forces |
