= David Muhoozi =

Ugandan Military Officer and Lawyer (born 1965)

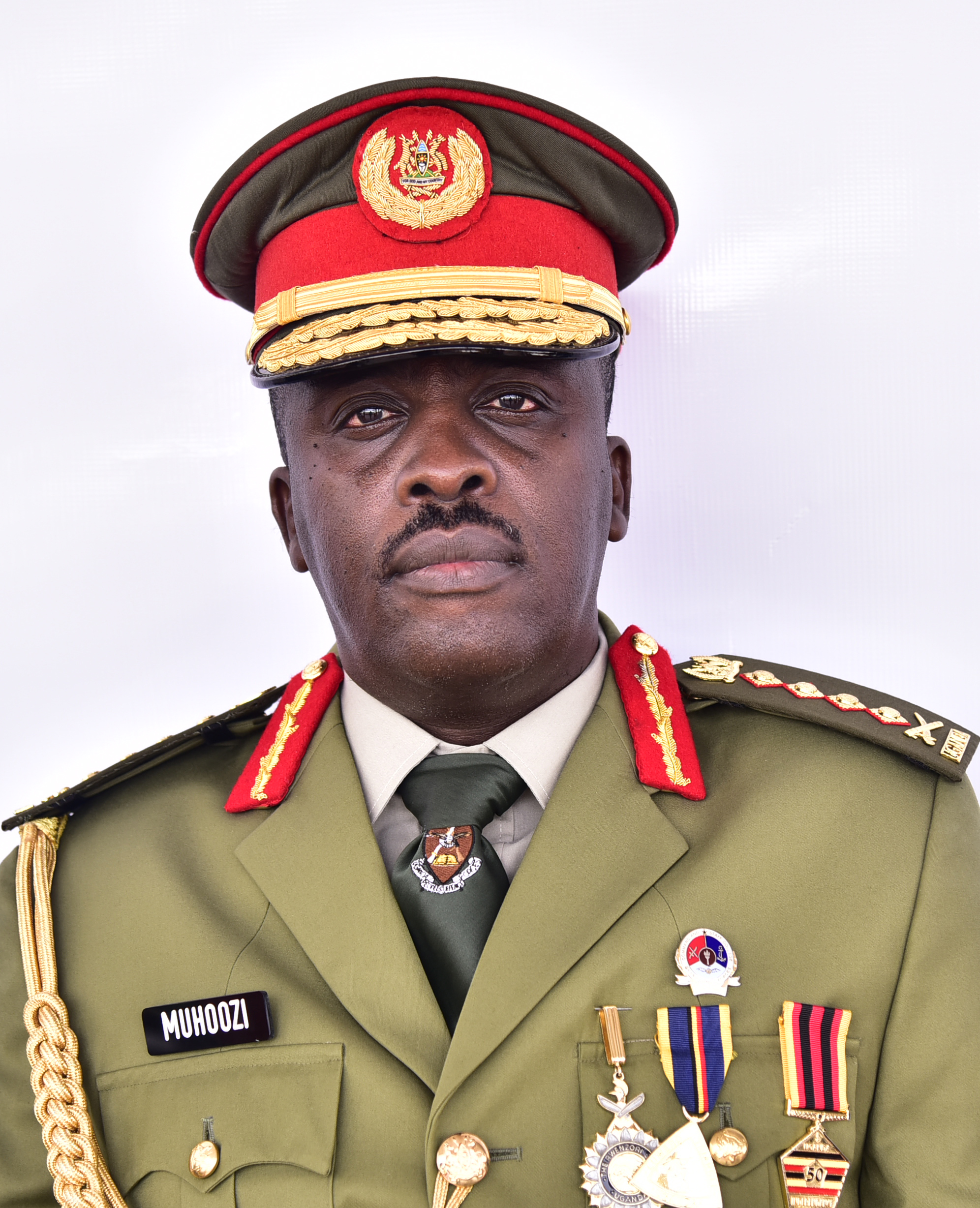
- Muhoozi R. David
- Born: 1965 (age 60–61); Uganda
- Education: Makerere University (Bachelor of Laws); Law Development Centre (Diploma in Legal Practice)
- Occupations: Lawyer, Military officer
- Years active: 1985 – present

David Rubakuba Muhoozi is a Ugandan military officer and lawyer. From 2021 to 2026 he served as Minister of State for Internal Affairs.

== Early life & education ==
David Muhoozi was born on 27 September 1965, in Mbarara District to Mzee Jackson Rubakuba, a retired police officer and Mrs. Edinansi Kyomugyemo Rubakuba, in a family of fourteen children. Muhoozi holds the degree of Bachelor of Laws (LLB), obtained from Makerere University, Uganda's largest and oldest public university. He also obtained the Diploma in Legal Practice, from the Law Development Center, in Kampala, Uganda. His degree of Master of Arts in International Affairs was obtained from an unknown institution.

== Military training ==
He attended the Uganda Military Academy, in Jinja, Uganda prior to its relocation, for his Officer Cadet course. He then attended the Company Commander course in Monduli, Tanzania, in 1998. In Ghana, he attended a Senior Command and Staff College course. After which, he was admitted to the Royal College of Defence Studies.

Over the years, he has also attended the following military courses: (1) A Professional Security Course in Israel (2) An Executive Course for Senior African Military Leaders in Beijing, China (3) An Internal Crisis Management Course in Ghana (4) An International Peace Support Operations (IPSO) Course at Kofi Annan International Peacekeeping Training Centre in Ghana (5) A Defense Management Course in Ghana and (6) A Senior International Defense Course at the Naval Postgraduate School in California, USA.

== Military career ==
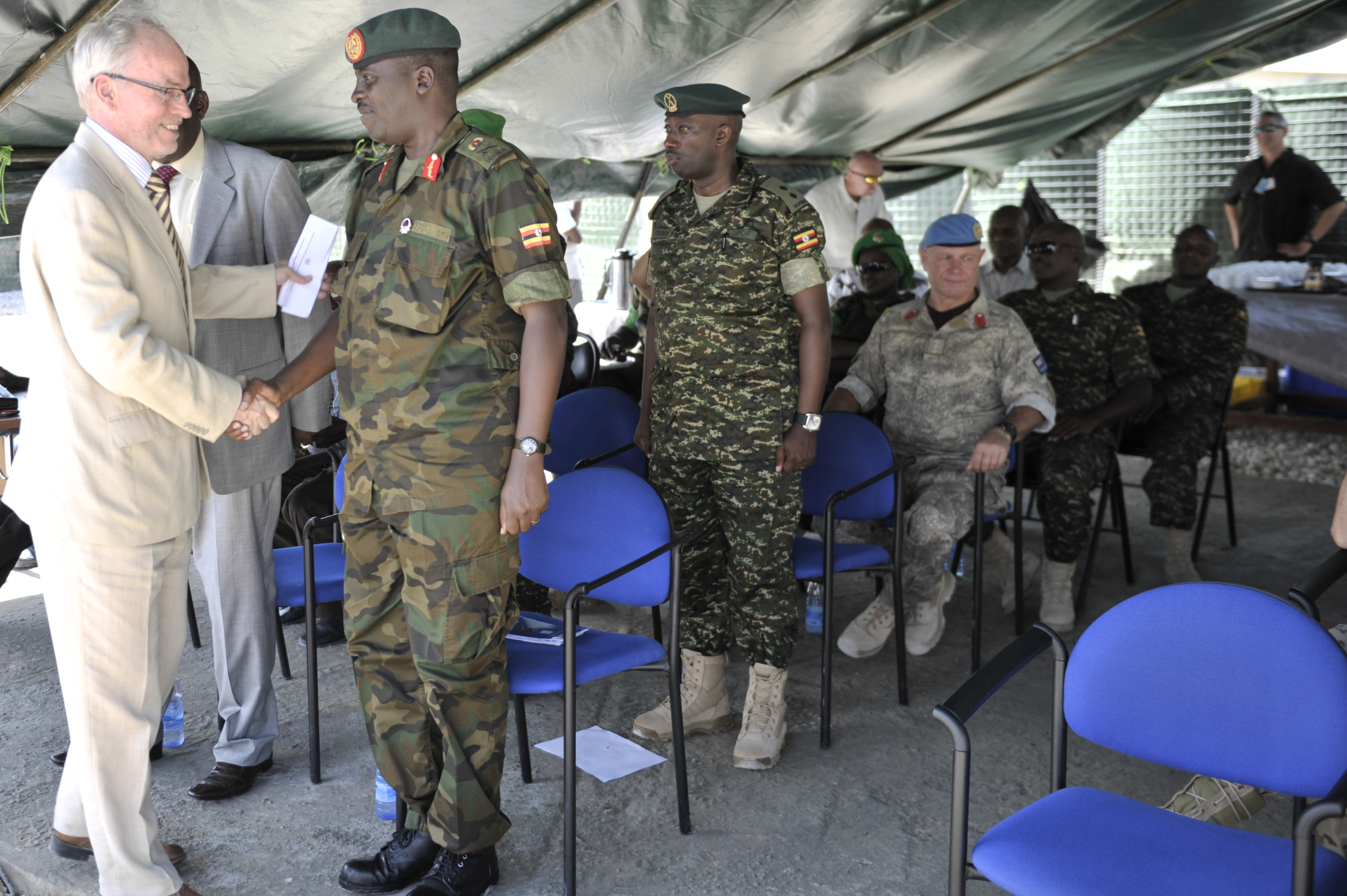
General David Rubakuba Muhoozi

He joined the army in 1985 and was commissioned on April 21, 1989. He then served as Defense Counsel for the General Court Martial. In 1997, he was assigned to the Chieftaincy of Military Intelligence (CMI), as Staff Officer General Duties, serving in that role for the next four years.

Over the years, he has served in these positions within the UPDF: (1) Base Commander, Entebbe Air Force Base (2) Chief Of Staff, UPDF Air Force (3) Commander of Air Defense Division – Nakasongola Air Force Base (4) Commander of the Armored Brigade – Masaka and (5) Brigade Commander, Motorized Infantry Brigade – Nakasongola. He was Chief of Defence Forces 2017–2021.

== See also ==
- Uganda People's Defence Force
