= Muhoozi Kainerugaba =

Ugandan general (born 1974) Founding father to PLU movement

General Muhoozi Kainerugaba
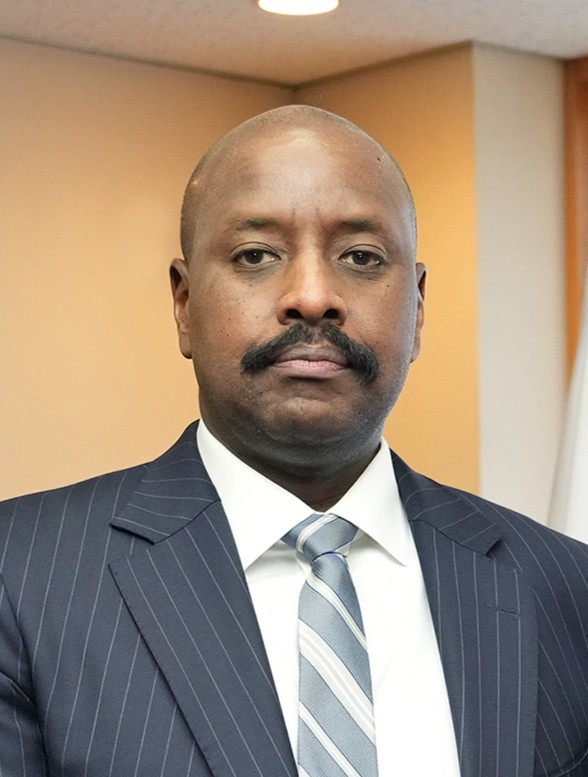
- Muhoozi in 2024
- Born: 24 April 1974 (age 52); Dar es Salaam, Tanzania
- Spouse: Charlotte Nankunda Kutesa (m. 1999)
- Children: Ruhamya Kainerugaba
- Relatives: Yoweri Museveni (father); Janet Museveni (mother)
- Military career
- Allegiance: Uganda People's Defense Force
- Branch: Ugandan Land Forces
- Service years: 1999 – present
- Rank: General
- Commands: Chief of Defence Forces (2024) Special Forces Command (2008–2017, 2020–2021) Commander UPDF Land forces (2021–2022)
- Conflicts: 2008–2009 Garamba offensive

Muhoozi Kainerugaba (born 24 April 1974) is a Ugandan military officer, Chief of Defence Forces of the Uganda People's Defence Force (UPDF) and the chairman of the Patriotic League of Uganda. He is the son of the President of Uganda, Yoweri Museveni. He is considered a likely successor to Museveni.

He served as the Commander of the Special Forces Command (SFC), Ugandan Military's special operations unit, from 2008 to 2017 and again from December 2020 to 2021. In January 2017, Muhoozi was appointed by his father, as Senior Presidential Adviser for Special Operations, leading to speculations "he was being groomed for the presidency." Retaining his aforementioned role, he was appointed again by his father, to serve as chief commander of the land forces of the UPDF from 24 June 2021 to 4 October 2022, when he was removed following controversial tweets on Twitter claiming to be able to capture Nairobi in less than two weeks. Despite this, on 21 March 2024, he was appointed by his father, Museveni as the Chief of Defence—a position that effectively makes him the head of Uganda's Military.

On June 28, 2026, Gen. Muhoozi Kainerugaba announced that the Daily Monitor and NTV Uganda — the country's largest independent newspaper and one of its largest private broadcasters — were being shut down and would not reopen without his permission. He said he did not believe in a free press, as military personnel were deployed to the outlets' offices.

Both the UPDF and the SFC are accused of using excessive force, as well as abductions; Muhoozi and other senior officials are mentioned in an International Criminal Court complaint. He announced he would be running for the presidential office in elections slated for 2026, on 15 March 2023, despite his father also indicating he would run for re-election.

Under his leadership as Commander of Uganda's Land forces, on 30 November 2021, Uganda and the Democratic Republic of Congo launched a joint military offensive in Eastern Congo dubbed 'Operation Shujaa', headed by then, Maj. Gen. Kayanja Muhanga. The stated reason was to fight against the jihadist- linked rebel group Allied Democratic Forces (ADF) based in eastern Congo along the border with Uganda.

== Early life and education ==
Muhoozi Kainerugaba was born on 24 April 1974 in Dar es Salaam, Tanzania, to Yoweri Museveni and Hope Rwaheru. At the time Museveni was an exiled FRONASA rebel outfit leader, as he and other émigrés based in Tanzania plotted to overthrow the Idi Amin dictatorship. Museveni has clung on to power since 1986, nearly seven years after Amin's downfall.

Raised in a Christian family, Muhoozi became born-again in his early years, during secondary school.

Muhoozi married Charlotte Nankunda Kutesa in 1999. As a child, Muhoozi briefly attended nursery school in Tanzania before enrolling at Kabale Preparatory School in Kabale, Uganda. He later studied at Mount Kenya Academy in Nyeri, Kenya, and Sweden. After his father became President of Uganda in 1986, he attended Kampala Parents' School in Kampala, King's College Budo, and St. Mary's College Kisubi. He graduated in 1994.

Muhoozi was admitted to the Egyptian Military Academy where he took both the company and battalion commanders courses. He also has attended the Kalama Armoured Warfare Training School. In 2007 he was admitted to a one-year course in military command at the United States Army Command and General Staff College at Fort Leavenworth, Kansas, graduating in June 2008. Following that, he successfully completed the Executive National Security Programme at the South African National Defence College. Muhoozi joined the University of Nottingham where he obtained a political science degree in 1997. He is a member of the Anglican Church of Uganda.

== Career ==
In 1999, Muhoozi joined the Uganda People's Defence Force (UPDF) at the rank of officer cadet and graduated in 2000 from the Royal Military Academy, Sandhurst, the British Army's officer training school. He quickly made promotion within UPDF although some of Museveni's close colleagues from the Ugandan Bush War as David Sejusa and Kizza Besigye opposed this.

In September 2011 Muhoozi was promoted to Colonel. In early 2012 Muhoozi enrolled at the South Africa's National Defence College for the Executive National Security Program. In August 2012 he was promoted to Brigadier General and appointed Commander SFC. In 2013 and 2014 Muhoozi was one of the senior UPDF commanders who deployed to South Sudan to support the Government of South Sudan after fighting broke out in Juba between rival factions of the South Sudan People's Defense Forces (SPLA).

In 2017 Muhoozi was appointed Senior Presidential Advisor for special operations, a position he held until December 2020. He served as SFC Commander from 2008 to 2017, and again from December 2020 to 2021, In February 2019, Museveni, promoted him to the rank of lieutenant-general.

In June 2021 Muhoozi was made commander of the UPDF's Infantry branch, succeeding Peter Elwelu who became deputy head of the Military. Elwelu is known to have commanded the infamous raid on the Rwenzururu [a cultural institution] palace in western Uganda in November 2016 in which he ordered UPDF to shell the palace, killing more than 150 of people, an attack that was widely condemned by Western countries.

In March 2022, he made comments online that he was retiring from military service. He has since retracted from this announcement. Later that year in October, following a series of unnecessary, posturing, and diplomacy-damaging tweets on the social media platform X (Twitter); the likes of which included threats of 'him' leading 'his army' to invade neighbouring Kenya and 'capturing' Nairobi in a matter of two weeks; and the touting of controversial Russian invasion of Ukraine Muhoozi was sacked from military office by Museveni. Instantaneously, however, he was promoted to a full General and he retained his role as a senior presidential adviser despite maintaining his tweets on the platform.

On 21 March 2024, Muhoozi was returned to the military after being appointed head of the UPDF by his father.

=== MK Project ===
In 2013, General David Sejusa Tinyefuza wrote a letter in which he explained a plan with the intention of having Muhoozi succeed his father as president. Army officers opposed to it were at risk of being assassinated. Sejusa told the BBC that Uganda was being turned into a "political monarchy," which Muhoozi denied. The letter led to one of the government's most aggressive attack on the media. The police laid siege to the Daily Monitor for more than 10 days, while many in Uganda were surprised by the silence of the international community. Tinyefuza spent over a year in exile in the United Kingdom before he returned. He was later arrested for insubordination in 2016.

The term 'Muhoozi (MK) project' is no longer a taboo. It is used frequently by Muhoozi proponents on social media. In February 2024, Gen. Muhoozi re-branded the "Muhoozi Project" into the "Patriotic League of Uganda"; its sole aim—ostensibly—to work towards reviving a spirit of good citizenship, national pride, national service, protection of vulnerable persons, combating corruption and mismanagement of public resources, and environmental protection without hinting on its political advocacy as an interest group.

=== Uganda–Rwanda tensions, 2018–2022 ===
In February 2019, Rwanda closed the border accusing Uganda of supporting rebel groups in order to destabilize Rwanda. Uganda accused the Rwanda government of espionage. In 2019 Rwanda's key demands included Uganda ceasing its apparent support for anti-Kigali elements and the release of its citizens—it claims the Ugandans abducted. Rwanda's main Gatuna border post between the two countries reopened in late January, following a meeting between Kagame and Muhoozi.

=== Military campaigns ===
In 2007 he commanded the decisive defeat of the ADF in Bundibugyo, in an operation where 80 enemy forces and the ADF's third in command were killed in action.

In 2008 he was deployed as Second-In-Command of "Operation Lightning Thunder" in the Democratic Republic of the Congo. This successful operation was organized to degrade the combat capacities of the rebel Lord's Resistance Army in Garamba, deep in the jungles of the Congo.

In 2009 he participated in training and commissioning the UPDF's first paratrooper element. Uganda's first paratroopers since 1976. Due to his role as commander of the SFC, Kainerugaba has been named in a complaint to the International Criminal Court (ICC) over abductions of Ugandan citizens and Human rights abuses.

=== 2026 media shutdown and arrests ===
In June 2026, Kainerugaba faced widespread domestic and international criticism following a series of military operations against opposition figures and independent media. Earlier in the month, prominent attorney and Kampala Lord Mayor Erias Lukwago was detained from his home by military forces. The arrest followed Lukwago's legal attempts to challenge Kainerugaba regarding the military's detention of opposition leader Kizza Besigye.

On June 28, 2026, Kainerugaba ordered the military shutdown of several major independent media outlets operating under the Nation Media Group, including the Daily Monitor newspaper, NTV Uganda, Spark TV, KFM, and Dembe FM. Armed military forces surrounded the media conglomerate's premises in Kampala, taking the stations off air and halting newspaper circulation. Kainerugaba confirmed the directive on the social media platform X, posting, "In Uganda, I do not believe in a free press! The press should be guided by cadres of the revolution." The action was widely condemned by local broadcasting groups and international watchdogs, including the Committee to Protect Journalists and Amnesty International, as a severe violation of press freedom.

== Controversies ==
On 31 December 2020, three days after being re-appointed SFC commander, Muhoozi posted a number of tweets attacking opposition politician Bobi Wine. The tweets were criticized as promoting tribalism. Responding to negative reactions, he removed the tweets.

A US$17 million tender contract to deliver medical oxygen was awarded to Silverbacks, a company owned by Muhoozi's wife Charlotte, leading to accusations of corruption. During the COVID-19 outbreak of June 2021, oxygen production struggled, causing many COVID-19 patients to die of oxygen shortages.

On 28 December 2021, Ugandan security forces put under house arrest, and subsequently arrested, lawyer and writer Kakwenza Rukira after he had insulted Muhoozi on Twitter. During that time, Kakwenza alleged he was tortured by SFC members under Muhoozi's direct supervision.

When Muhoozi was still an active serving officer in the UPDF, some had criticized his latest active involvement in politics and taking on roles typically meant for civilian diplomats as breaking the UPDF code of conduct for a serving officer. For instance, he played an active role in the mending of the Rwanda-Uganda relationship culminating in the successful re-opening of Uganda's border with Rwanda. Active serving military personnel are barred from engaging in active political roles in Uganda, according to UPDF rules.

In February 2022, he expressed support for Russia's invasion of Ukraine and wrote that Russian President Vladimir Putin "is absolutely right!"

In May 2022, Muhoozi praised former U.S. President Donald Trump, describing him as the "only white man I have ever respected."

In October 2022, Muhoozi received attention for publicly offering 100 cows as a bride price for Italian Prime Minister Giorgia Meloni, who at that point was widely expected to become the next Prime Minister of Italy, threatening to conquer Rome if the dowry was rebuffed.

On 3 October 2022, Muhoozi caused a diplomatic incident with Kenya when, on Twitter, he threatened to invade the country and conquer Nairobi, compelling his father to apologise for the comments.

In December 2024, Muhoozi threatened on X to "capture" Khartoum after Donald Trump reassumes the US presidency in 2025, prompting the Sudanese government to demand an official apology. The tweets were later deleted.

On 2 May 2025, in a post on X, Muhoozi claimed that missing opposition activist Eddie Mutwe was "in my basement," circulated a photo of the shirtless detainee, and threatened to castrate him, saying he would release Mutwe only on President Museveni's orders. The Uganda Human Rights Commission declared the detention unlawful and directed Kainerugaba to free Mutwe immediately.

After the 2026 presidential election, Muhoozi said that his forces had killed 22 members of the National Unity Platform and said that he hoped that Bobi Wine would be the 23rd.

On mid April 2026, he demanded 1 billion dollars from Turkey and the "most beautiful woman in the country" as his wife, threatening to cut diplomatic ties with Turkey if demands are not met.

== X use ==
Having been previously known to be generally a silent observer on Uganda's political scene, Muhoozi has recently taken to X, suddenly becoming outspoken on a number of socio-political issues in Uganda, but mostly in praise of the UPDF which he hails as 'the greatest Army in the world'. In a 2013 speech to the UPDF High Command, President Museveni said this of the then Brig. Muhoozi, "I am most pleased that Muhoozi has turned out to be a very serious officer, quiet and devoted to the building of the army" in reference to Muhoozi's work in building the Special Forces Command. Muhoozi has been dubbed by some in the media as the 'tweeting General' in reference to his sudden prolific use of X, frequently posting content that some do not view as befitting of someone of his rank and position in the Army and in Uganda's social sphere.

Through X, Muhoozi has actively commented on Uganda's fractured relationship with Rwanda promising to speak with his 'uncle', Rwandan President Paul Kagame to allow for the re-opening of their country's border, which was closed by Rwanda in 2019 in a diplomatic protest accusing Uganda of harboring and supporting elements that the government considered active in attempting to destabilize the country. On March 6, 2022, Muhoozi took to Twitter to announce that the Rwanda-Uganda border would be fully re-opened on March 7, 2022, after several diplomatic engagements that saw Muhoozi travel to Kigali twice in early 2022. He said in praise of the successful negotiations to re-open the border, "The border is fully opening tomorrow. Me and my uncle (President Kagame) achieved in 7 hours what all the diplomats on earth failed to achieve. I think we need a prize."

=== Presidential ambitions ===
The Muhoozi Project has alleged that there is a plan for Muhoozi to become Uganda's next president and succeed his father, Yoweri Museveni, who has ruled since January 1986 under the National Resistance Movement (NRM). However, there are some who believe that the President's son-in-law and Senior Presidential Advisor for Special Duties, Odrek Rwabwogo, is also interested in succeeding Museveni, creating two competing camps. It is not clear who the ruling NRM party will back to succeed president Museveni who has not indicated when or if he will leave office.

On 8 March 2022, Muhoozi took to Twitter to announce that he would be retiring from the UPDF, although no timeline for the retirement was given. He said that, "After 28 years of service in my glorious military, the greatest military in the world, I am happy to announce my retirement. Me and my soldiers have achieved so much! I have only love and respect for all those great men and women that achieve greatness for Uganda everyday [sic]." The tweet generated a lot of national and international media attention, with Reuters writing that the move was seen by some as a preparation for the presidency. However, prominent Ugandan journalist Andrew Mwenda, Muhoozi's friend and long-time confidant, posted a video on his Twitter timeline with Muhoozi a few hours after Muhoozi's retirement tweet, appearing to clarify that the retirement will only come in "exactly eight years" [2030]. Uganda's next presidential election is slated for 2026.

On 11 April 2022, Muhoozi de-activated his Twitter account which had a verified Twitter handle @mkainerugaba. It was not immediately clear why he de-activated his account but some sources stated that Muhoozi feared that, "there was sabotage against him and that he was being targeted by 'Big Tech' to silence him and his supporters".

Prior to de-activating his account, Muhoozi had put in place plans to celebrate his upcoming 48th birthday with Uganda's Attorney General Kiryowa Kiwanuka as the Chairperson of his 48th birthday organising committee. The list of nearly 28 members of the organizing committee consisted of other high-profile members of Ugandan society including prominent army officers, government officials, media personalities and members of parliament.

The unusual approach Muhoozi had taken to using his Twitter account to comment publicly on somewhat sensitive issues across Uganda and the region placed him and the UPDF under heavy spotlight as he is the commander of the land forces of the country's military. This came at a time when the UPDF was fighting against prolonged civil conflict in the Karamoja region involving notorious cattle rustlers where Muhoozi threatened to abandon diplomatic channels to ending the conflict and promised to bring "hell" to those involved in what he called 'robbery and violence' in Karamoja. At the same time, the UPDF along with DRC forces are fighting against the ADF militant group in eastern DRC in Operation Shujaa that commenced in November 2021.

On 16 April 2022, five days after deactivating his Twitter account, Muhoozi re-activated it, writing, "Never fear my followers and supporters. I'm back. I had some decisions to make." It was not immediately clear what those decisions were.

On 21 September 2024, Muhoozi announced that he was supporting his father running for a seventh term as president.

A 2026 study found that Kainerugaba is "deeply unpopular with the public. Notably, he is even unpopular—in comparative and absolute terms—in the family’s home western region. This is striking given the importance of regionalism and ethnicity in Uganda, and in patrimonial systems more broadly."

== See also ==
- Katumba Wamala
- David Muhoozi
- Samuel Turyagyenda
- Sam Kutesa
- Caleb Akandwanaho
- Janet Kataha Museveni
- Patriotic League of Uganda
