= Battle of El Adde =

Al-Shabaab-KDF military incident in 2016

Coordinates: 2.7698°N 41.7853°E

2016 Battle of El Adde
- Part of the War in Somalia
- Kenyan soldiers killed at El-Adde
Date	15 January 2016
Location	El Adde, Gedo, Somalia
Result	Major Al-Shabaab victory: Kenya Defense Forces temporarily pull out of 3 towns in Gedo; Deadliest attack on AMISOM mission to date.; El Adde temporarily captured by Al Shabaab, recaptured by KDF four days later.

Belligerents
Al-Shabaab	AMISOM: Kenya; Federal Government of Somalia

Commanders and leaders
Ahmad Umar (Emir of Al-Shabaab); Maalim Janow ^{[*]} Mahad Mohammed Karatey (Intelligence Chief)^{[*]} Ahmed Iman Ali; AbduQadir Ali †	Maj. Jeffrey Obuoge † (KDF Commanding officer); Warrant Officer Isaac Otsyalo †; Sgt. Juma Zahoro † (Officer in KDF Intelligence Unit) (Somalia) Gen. Abas Ibrahim Gurey

Units involved
Saleh Nabhan brigade Abu Zubair battalion	Kenya Army Infantry: 9th Kenya Rifles; 5th Kenya Rifles

Strength
200 fighters	(Kenya) Company: ~175 to around 600 soldiers

Casualties and losses
Unknown ^{[**]}	(Kenya) : 150-400 killed^{[**]} 11 captured 12 wounded
- 12 civilians killed
- ^{*} Al Shabaab leaders subsequently killed in retaliatory air-strikes (per Kenya's military).^{**} Approximate casualty figure.

The Battle of El Adde took place on 15 January 2016. Al-Shabaab militants launched an attack on a Kenyan-run AMISOM army base in the town of El Adde, Gedo, Somalia. It remains the deadliest attack on the African Union Mission to Somalia and is the Kenya Defence Forces (KDF) largest defeat since independence in 1963. As such, the Kenyan government went to extreme lengths to conceal the extent of its losses. It has been described by the media as a "military massacre" or military disaster. It was also the largest military defeat in Kenyan history.

== Background ==
In 2011, Kenya launched an incursion into Somalia, "Operation Linda Nchi." In 2012 Kenya joined the African Union Mission to Somalia (AMISOM). From that time, the KDF has occupied the southern Gedo Region of Somalia with around 3,000 troops.

According to Abas Ibrahim Gurey, a Marehan war leader in the area who often cooperates with the Somali authorities, clear and reliable intelligence of an imminent attack had been passed along to the commanding officer in charge of the El Adde base, 45 days in advance.

== Kenyan army base attack ==
A VBIED explodes at the gates of the Kenyan Base at El Adde

On 15 January, at 6:30 a.m before morning prayers, a suicide bomber detonated his explosive laden armoured personnel carrier to the front gate to an AMISOM garrison base in El-Adde, Gedo, Somalia. The base compound housed a company of men belonging to both the 5th and 9th Kenya Rifles. Both Kenyan Rifle Battalions were detached to the El-Adde base only two weeks beforehand. The total size of the garrison that day has been generally put at around 600 Kenyan troops present.

According to KDF spokesperson General Samson Mwathethe, the explosion was three times more powerful than the 1998 United States embassy bombings in Nairobi. The massive blast damaged the command and communications buildings, as well as an armory and fuel depots of the base, killing dozens of soldiers. Al Shabaab named the suicide bomber as AbduQadir Ali.

The suicide explosion was a precursor to an estimated 150 to 300 Al-Shabaab fighters assaulting the base with rocket-propelled grenades and assault weapons. The attack caught Kenyan troops unprepared and asleep. At approximately 7:30 a.m, the battle lasted for more than one hour of fierce fighting, until Kenyan troops were routed from the base and fled into the dense bush pursued by Al Shabaab militants.

A neighboring Somali National Army (SNA) base located 600 meters away from the AMISOM base, was empty of troops, who allegedly left and were warned hours before the attack, per the Kenyan military. It was initially reported that the SNA base came under assault and Kenyan troops were supporting the Somali Army and that the KDF had incurred unspecified losses. However, this story was revised.

=== Tactical failures ===
According to the Cable News Network (CNN), "The apparent ease with which the militants breached barriers at El Adde has surprised many security analysts -- especially since the same style of assault had been seen before in bloody attacks on AMISOM forces."

One Western diplomat based in the Somali capital, Mogadishu, told CNN this was clearly a "tactical disaster" for the Kenyans. "How can two hundred Al-Shabaab walk across a field in broad daylight without the Kenyans noticing? Where were the KDF's machine guns?" he asked. "This is contrary to everything they have been taught, and should be doing in a hostile environment."

== Casualties ==
Al Shabaab claimed to have captured 12 Kenyan soldiers, including the commanding officer after the battle. Later al-Katāi’b Media associated with Al-Shabaab, released a 48-minute-long propaganda video showing the bodies of at least 63 dead KDF soldiers and captured military hardware, including several tanks and long range field artillery. They later claimed to have killed over 600 Kenyan troops, although this has been deemed an understatement. This number does not include ethnic-Somali soldiers in Kenyan uniform.

A new death toll from available open source information indicates that ranges from 141 to around 200 Kenyan troops, including all officers, were killed in action. Around 40 survivors managed to escape and an unknown number are still unaccounted for. Separately, DNA samples were taken from 143 bodies at the scene, most of which were burned beyond recognition.

== Aftermath and reactions ==
Kenyan president Uhuru Kenyatta expressed his condolences to the families and vowed militants would pay a heavy price for the attack. He reaffirmed Kenyan support in the AMISOM and ruled out withdrawal of troops from Somalia. Privately, the president and much of the government blamed the military disaster on the incompetence of KDF officers deployed in Somalia. Kenyan bishops around the country offered condolences.

The Somali president Hassan Sheikh Mohamud condemned the attack. In a later interview with Somali Cable TV, he described the attack as a "defeat" in a line of victories and put the KDF death toll at close to 200 to around 600 fatalities. However, according to a Somali presidential spokesman, he was "misquoted" on the precise casualty figures when questioned by the Kenyan military.

Nigerian president Muhammadu Buhari along with Somali president Hassan Sheikh Mohamud made a three-day visit to Kenya to attend a ceremony in honor of the soldiers killed at the Moi army barracks in Eldoret, Kenya.

On 22 January, the alleged mastermind of the El Adde attack and leader of the Al Shabaab "Abu Zubair battalion", Maalim Janow, was killed in retaliatory airstrikes according to Kenya's military.

=== Cover-up ===
According to CNN, "to prevent details of what happened at El Adde from emerging, Kenya's government used a rarely enforced law prohibiting the distribution of images or information likely to cause public fear and alarm or undermine security operations. One local blogger who tweeted a photograph showing the aftermath of the attack was promptly arrested. He was later released without charge."

"There is clearly an attempt to mislead Kenyans and to hide the truth about what happened," said Patrick Gathara, a political commentator and cartoonist who lashed out at the KDF and Kenyan government in local newspapers after the attack. "It is being hidden to avoid accountability." "Who died for you in El Adde?" Gathara believes there is a deliberate attempt "to avoid accountability."Added Gathara, "It is all very deliberate and designed to avoid public demands for senior officials and officers to be held responsible for failures. "The truth about El Adde is being hidden from Kenyans, not from Al-Shabaab."

CNN reports, "Tellingly, Al-Shabaab's propaganda video uses the Kenyan authorities' own words against them, highlighting the inaccurate KDF press release sent in the immediate aftermath of the attack, and accusing the KDF of "distorting the truth and blatantly lying to their public." Analysts say the KDF's lack of transparency has only provided more fodder for Al-Shabaab's ideological battle."

"Although they cite national security reasons, what they end up doing is creating an opportunity for Al-Shabaab to propagandize their victories, perhaps exaggerate them," said Peter Pham, director of the Atlantic Council's Africa Center."But there's no way of countering that narrative because there is no real narrative coming from the government."

"The AU [African Union] would be better served by contesting the Al-Shabaab narrative, not ceding ground to it," said Paul D. Williams, Associate Professor of International Affairs at George Washington University, who specializes in reporting on peacekeeping missions. "Silence is not a winning strategy in the world of strategic communications," he told CNN in late January, shortly after the attack.

== See also ==
- Westgate shopping mall attack
- Garissa University College attack
- Operation Linda Nchi
- Operation Indian Ocean
- Battle of Leego (2015)
