= Arbacow =

Village in Somalia

Arbacow is a village near Mogadishu in Somalia. It is home to a base of the African Union Mission to Somalia.
