= 2009 African Union base bombings in Mogadishu =

Bombing in Somalia

Coordinates: 2.033°N 45.35°E

2009 African Union base bombings
- Location: Mogadishu, Somalia
- Date: 22 February 2009; 17 September 2009
- Target: AMISOM soldiers
- Attack type: Suicide bombings
- Deaths: 32
- Injuries: 55
- Perpetrator: al-Shabaab

Two large-scale attacks against AMISOM soldiers carried out by al-Shabaab suicide bombers in Mogadishu, Somalia occurred in 2009. In total 32 people, including 28 AMISOM soldiers, were killed and 55 people were injured.

== 22 February attack ==
On 22 February 2009, was carried out by Al-Shabaab. against the base of the African Union Mission to Somalia in Mogadishu. The attack, carried out by one suicide bomber in a car and one on foot, left 11 Burundian soldiers dead and 15 others seriously hurt. The car bomber was a Somali contractor who had easy access to the base.

== 17 September attack ==
On 17 September 2009, twin suicide bombings occurred at Aden Adde International Airport, the headquarters of AMISOM, in Mogadishu, killing 17 soldiers. The bombers were able to enter the base using two stolen white UN cars and struck a meeting between the AMISOM troops and the Transitional Federal Government. Brigadier General Juvenal Niyoyunguruza of Burundi, the deputy head of AMISOM, was killed in the blast, while the mission's Ugandan commander, General Nathan Mugisha, was wounded. Of the dead peacekeepers, 12 were Burundian and five were Ugandan. Four Somali civilians also died in the attacks, which wounded another 40 people.

=== Aftermath ===
Shelling by both al-Shabaab and AMISOM after the bombings killed 19 Somali civilians.
