= Wilberforce Sserunkuma =

Ugandan general

Brigadier General Wilberforce Sserunkuma
- Born: Uganda
- Occupation: Military Officer
- Years active: 1982 – present
- Known for: Military Matters

Brigadier General Wilberforce Sserunkuma (born circa 1960), is a Ugandan military officer in the Uganda People's Defence Forces (UPDF). Effective January 2025, he is the commander of the Third Infantry Division of the UPDF, based in Moroto, in the Karamoja sub-region, in northeastern Uganda.

== Biography ==
He was born in Uganda's Central Uganda, circa 1960s. He joined the Ugandan National Resistance Army in 1982, in Luweero District. At the rank of colonel, Sserunkuma commanded the 405 Brigade in Kotido District as part of the UPDF dis-armament operation in Karamoja. He served there for six consecutive years. He was then transferred to Mbarara, where he served as the acting deputy commander at the UPDF Second Infantry Division. In June 2024, he was reassigned to Moroto District as the deputy commander at the UPDF Third Infantry Division. In July 2024, he was promoted from the rank of colonel to that of brigadier general.

Previously, he served as a junior commander of operations against the Lord's Resistance Army (LRA) in Uganda's Northern Region. He commanded the 9th Infantry Battalion during "Operation Iron Fist", intended to dislodge the LRA rebels from Bilinyang, Nisitu, and Imatongo Hills, in South Sudan. He served in Somalia in the AMISOM and ATMIS operations. In 2012 he was the commanding officer of the 9th Infantry Battalion. Then in 2019 he was the commander of Battle Group 28.

On 3 January 2025, he officially took over command of the 3rd UPDF Division from Major General Don Nabasa, who was appointed Joint Staff Policy and Strategy. The handover took place at the Officers Mess of the 3rd UPDF Division and was presided over by Lieutenant General Kayanja Muhanga, the commander of the UPDF Land Forces.

Military offices
Preceded by Don Nabasa	Commander 3rd Infantry Division of the UPDF; Since 3 January 2025	Succeeded by Incumbent
