= Francis Okello =

Ugandan major general

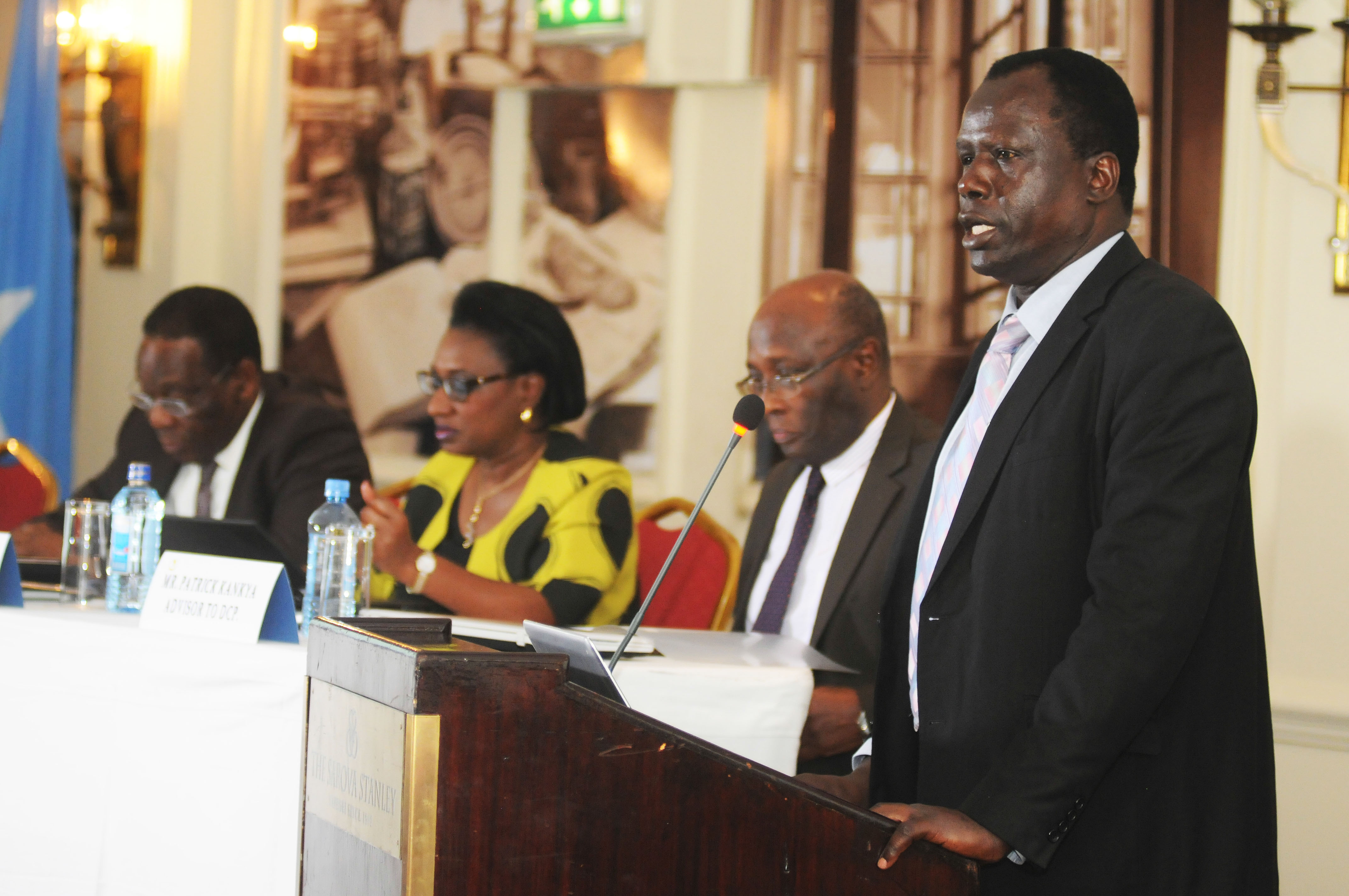
- Military career
- Allegiance: Uganda
- Branch: Uganda People's Defence Force
- Rank: Major General
- Commands: Commander of AMISOM
- Awards: U.S. Legion of Merit

Francis Okello also known as Francis Ben Okello is a retired major general in Uganda People's Defence Force. He went to Cranifield University where he obtained a masters in Logistics Management and Defence Procurement from 2004 to 2005.

== Education ==
He attended a Strategic Leadership program in 2002 in Harvard University, John F. Kennedy School of Government.

He obtained a Post Graduate Diploma in Management and Public Administration From Ghana Institute of Management and Public Administration(GIMPA).

== Career ==
Major General Francis Okello was the second Force commander of the African Union Mission in Somalia (AMISOM) from 3 March 2008 to the end of his tour of duty in 2009, after leading key peaceking effort which he later returned to the army headquarter in Bombo, Uganda.

Following his service in Somalia Okello served as the Commandant of the National Defense College Uganda (NDC-U) where he advocated for youth skills and agricultural mechanization as the pillars of national development and he was later promoted to Lieutenant General in 2025 shortly before his retirement.

Francis Ben Okello served as Uganda's Military Attach to Kenya from 2016. He was one of the seven distinguished UPDF Military generals who retired officially in 2025.

== Award ==
Okello was awarded the U.S. Legion of Merit by U.S. Africa Command for peacekeeping leadership against al-Shabaab.

Francis Okello has been recognized for his integrity, discipline and significant contribution to institutional stability and military education with the Uganda army.

== See also ==
- Moses Ali
- James Birungi
- Flavia Byekwaso

Military offices
Preceded by General Levi Karuhanga	Commander of AMISOM; 3 March 2008 - 7 July 2009	Succeeded by Major General Nathan Mugisha
