= Battle of Leego (2015) =

Attack by al-Shabaab on an African Union base in southwestern Somalia

- Part of Somali Civil War (2009–present) and 2015 Ramadan attacks
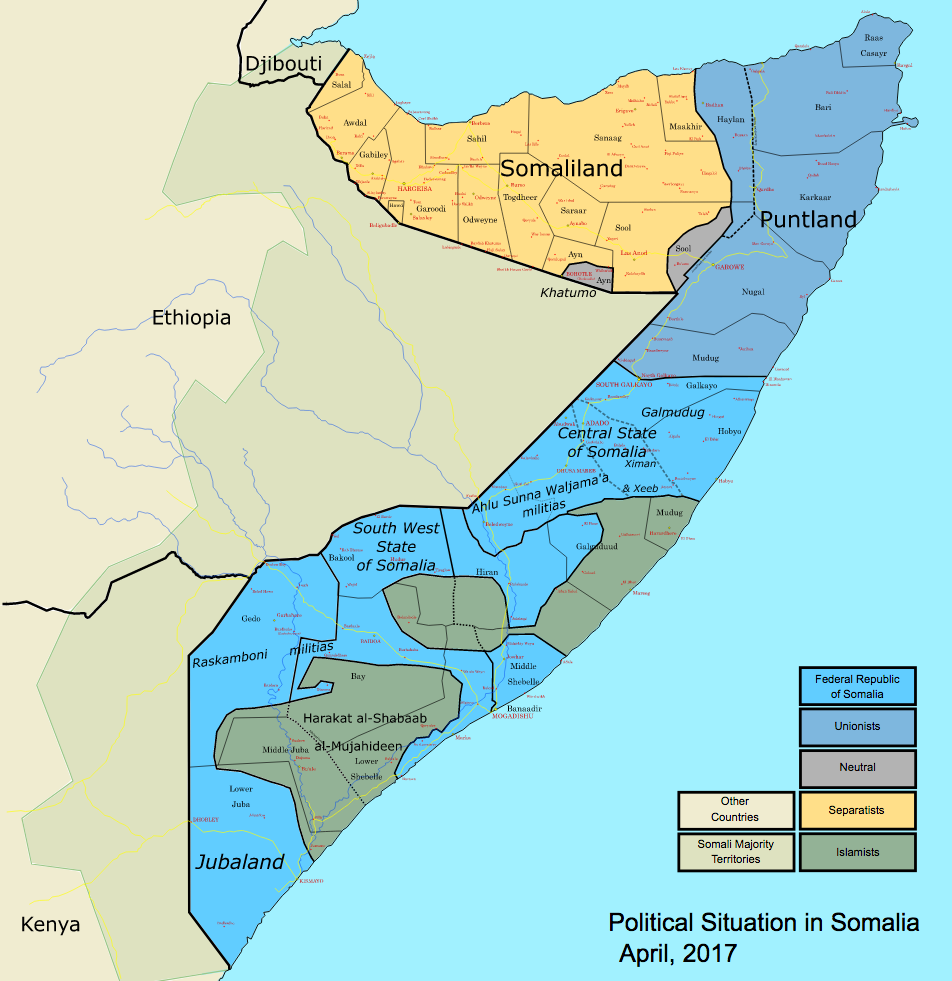
- Political situation in Somalia (October 2014)
Date	26 June 2015
Location	Leego, Somalia 2°42′55″N 44°30′46″E
Result	Al-Shabaab Victory, AMISOM Strategic Victory Al-Shabaab briefly captures Leego base, before withdrawing.

Belligerents
AMISOM Burundi	Al-Shabaab

Commanders and leaders
(Burundi) Lieutenant General Silas Ntigurirwa	Ahmad Umar

Strength
100 soldiers	At least several dozen

Casualties and losses
70 killed 27 wounded	Unknown

Al-Shabaab militants attacked an African Union Mission to Somalia base in the Leego district of Somalia and killed 70 African Union soldiers and seized control of their military base on 26 June 2015. A military outpost with around 100 Burundian soldiers was attacked by militants with a car bomb, machine guns and rocket-propelled grenades.

The Mail & Guardian described the attack as the "latest attack during the insurgents’ annual Ramadan fighting season." It was reported that militants beheaded survivors of the attack at the base. Footage has been released of barefoot dead soldiers and a soldier being shot.

Somali and AMISOM troops reportedly retook the base and town on 28 June while al-Shabaab withdrew and offered no resistance to them but not before beheading the local Deputy District commissioner among the captives they took.

The battle coincided with the 2015 Ramadan attacks conducted by ISIL and its sympathizers. However no direct link between the al-Shabaab attack and the other attacks that day exists.

== See also ==
- 2015 timeline of the War in Somalia
