= African Union Mission to Somalia =

Peacekeeping operation (2007–2022)

African Union Mission in Somalia
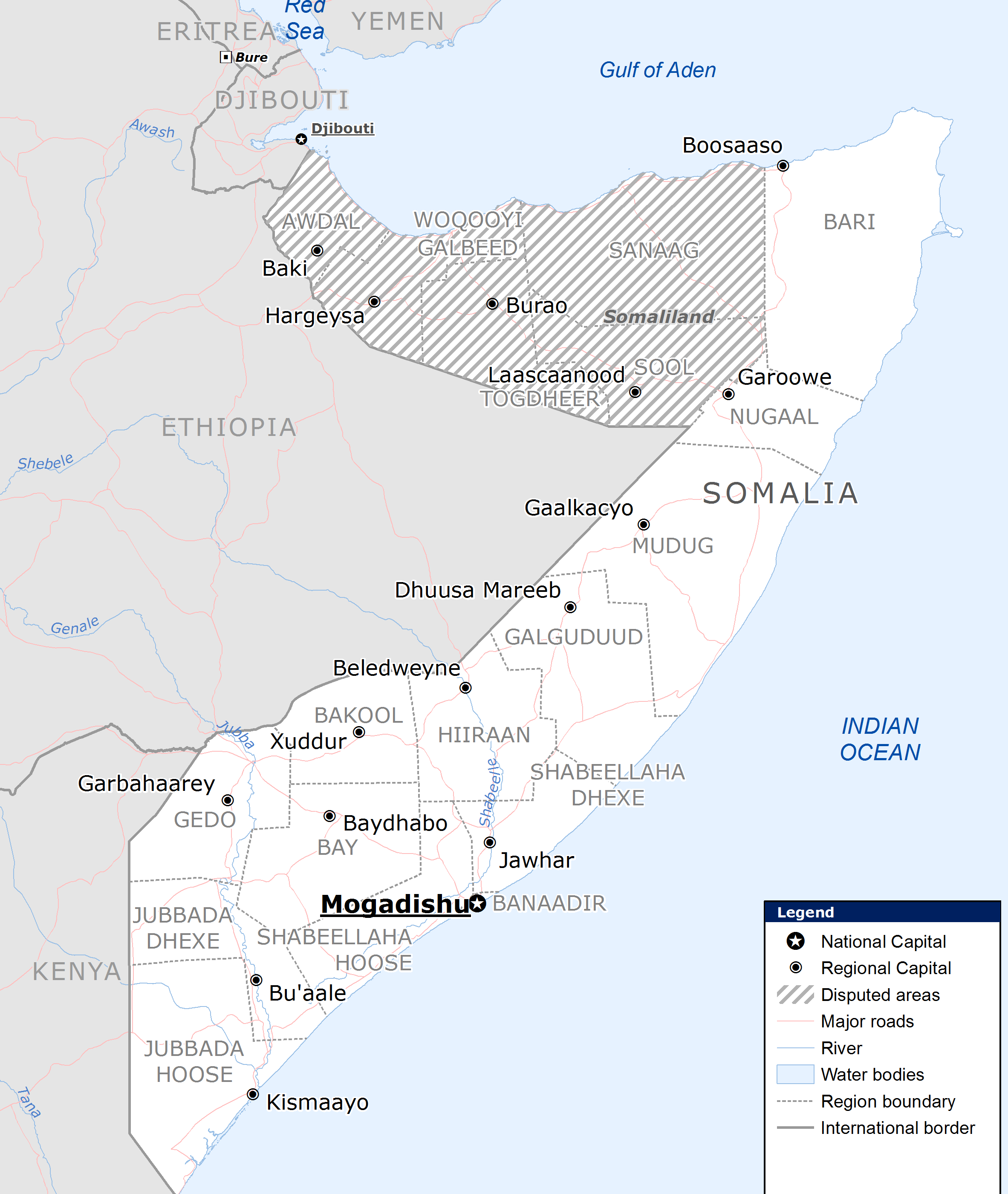
- Map of Somalia
- Dates active: March 2007 – 31 March 2022 (15 years, 25 days)
- Headquarters: Mogadishu
- Active regions: Central and southern Somalia
- Size: 20,626 (2019)
- Wars: Somali Civil War; Ethiopian invasion and occupation (2006–2009); Somali civil war (2009–present)
- Website: amisom-au.org

The African Union Mission in Somalia (AMISOM) was a multinational force formed by the African Union. The operation deployed to Somalia soon after the Islamic Courts Union was deposed by troops from Ethiopia during a large scale invasion in late 2006. The mission's primary objective was to maintain the regime change between the ICU and the newly installed Transitional Federal Government, implement a national security plan and train the TFG security forces. As part of its duties, AMISOM later supported the Federal Government of Somalia in its war against Al-Shabaab. AMISOM was the most deadly peacekeeping operation in the post-war era.

AMISOM was created by the African Union's Peace and Security Council on 19 January 2007 with an initial six-month mandate. On 21 February 2007 the United Nations Security Council approved the mission's mandate. Subsequent six-monthly renewals of AMISOM's mandate by the African Union Peace and Security Council have also been authorized by the United Nations Security Council.

In March 2007, the first AMISOM troops deployed to Somalia, landing in Mogadishu as fighting was raging between Islamist insurgents and Ethiopian/TFG forces. After four years of intense urban fighting against Al-Shabaab in Mogadishu, during the Battle of Mogadishu (2010–2011) the Uganda People's Defence Force (Army) and Burundian Army forced the militants to withdraw from the capital. In 2014, Ethiopia was integrated into AMISOM. In the succeeding years 2012-2015 a number of towns in the hinterland were recaptured, though most of the rural clans remained under Al-Shabaab rule.

The duration of AMISOM's mandate had been extended in each period that it has been up for review, until it was replaced on April 1, 2022, by the African Union Transition Mission in Somalia. On 21 December 2021, the United Nations Security Council reauthorized AMISOM in Somalia for three months. The new mandate ran until 31 March 2022, ahead of a phased handover of responsibilities to Somalia's security forces in early 2023. AMISOM's mandate ended on 31 March 2022, and was replaced by the African Union Transition Mission in Somalia.

== Background ==
During 2005 the Transitional Federal Government was deeply divided over the issue of a possible deployment of foreign troops in Somalia. Various prominent Somali leaders and groups threatened to forcefully oppose such an intervention. The IGAD planned on deploying in March 2005 despite significant opposition, though the operation was cancelled. As early as 25 March 2005 the Islamic Courts Union (ICU), a rising Islamist group fighting warlords in Mogadishu, warned that any foreigner peacekeepers deployed to Somalia would be unwelcome and face death. Faced with the ascendancy of the ICU after taking over the capital in the Battle of Mogadishu between May and June 2006, UN-watchers were growing concerned with the level of hostility of the ICU towards the proposed foreign deployment. The African Union adopted a plan to deploy troops to Somalia on 14 September 2006. Plans for a foreign deployment continued, though the ICU was clearly opposed, as they saw IGASOM as a US/Western means to curb their growth. Until December 2006, the UN Security Council had imposed an arms embargo on the group, but the embargo was partially lifted and a mandate for foreign troops was issued on 6 December 2006 for six months.

The African Union's involvement in the war came at the insistence of both Ethiopia and the United States for the organization to take over the role of 'regime changer'. In effect, the newly planned AU military operation in Somalia was an attempt to legitimize the Ethiopian invasion and TFG. According to Cocodia, "AMISOM was more a tool for regime change than it was a peace operation." AMISOM's deployment served as an exit strategy for Ethiopian troops, as their presence was inflaming an insurgency. On 20 February 2007, the United Nations granted authorization for the deployment of a peacekeeping mission by the African Union, known as the African Union Mission to Somalia (AMISOM). The mission's stated primary objective was to provide support for a national reconciliation congress in Somalia.

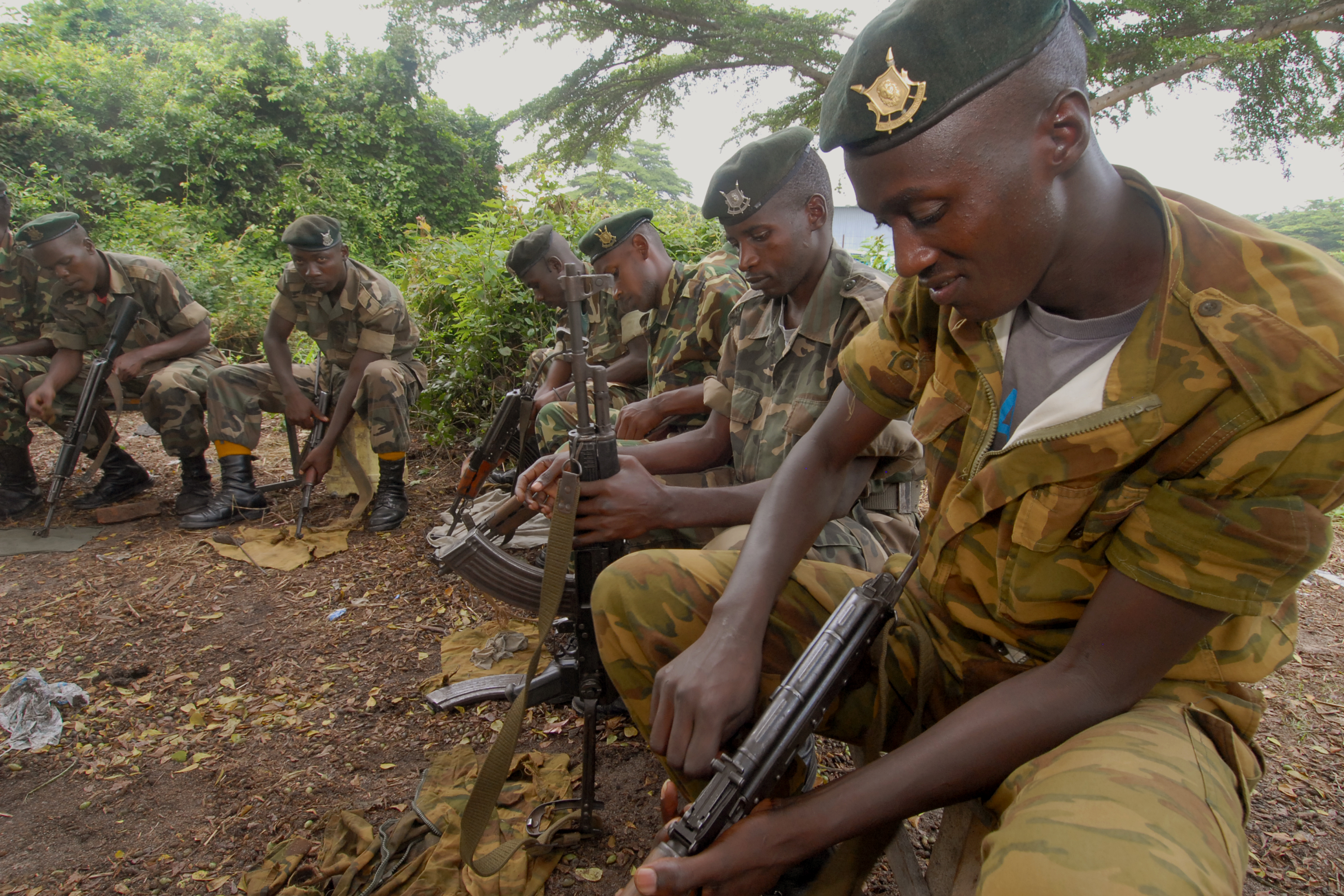
Burundian troops preparing to deploy to Somalia, 2006

From 2007 to 2009, AMISOM was predominantly composed of troops from Uganda, Burundi, and a few Kenyans. During 2007, the operation relied heavily on Ugandan Peoples Defence Forces (UPDF), as Uganda played a crucial role in offering support to the initiation of the mission. By the end of the year, Burundian troops also joined the effort. AMISOM's initial mandate did not permit the use of offensive force, resulting in limited involvement in the conflict between Ethiopian forces and the insurgency. This dynamic led to growing tensions between AMISOM and the ENDF, exacerbated by a lack of transparency from Ethiopia regarding its objectives within Somalia. The European Union was reportedly 'exceptionally unhappy' about the heavy US support for the December invasion, and held back funds for the newly created AMISOM mission for several months.

== Authorization ==
The African Union Peace and Security Council authorized AMISOM in January 2007, explicitly assuming that it would become a UN mission after six months. On 21 February 2007, the United Nations Security Council authorized the AU to deploy a peacekeeping mission with a mandate of six months. On 20 August 2007, the United Nations Security Council extended the African Union's authorisation to continue deploying AMISOM for a further six months and requested the Secretary-General to explore the option of replacing AMISOM with a United Nations mission to Somalia.

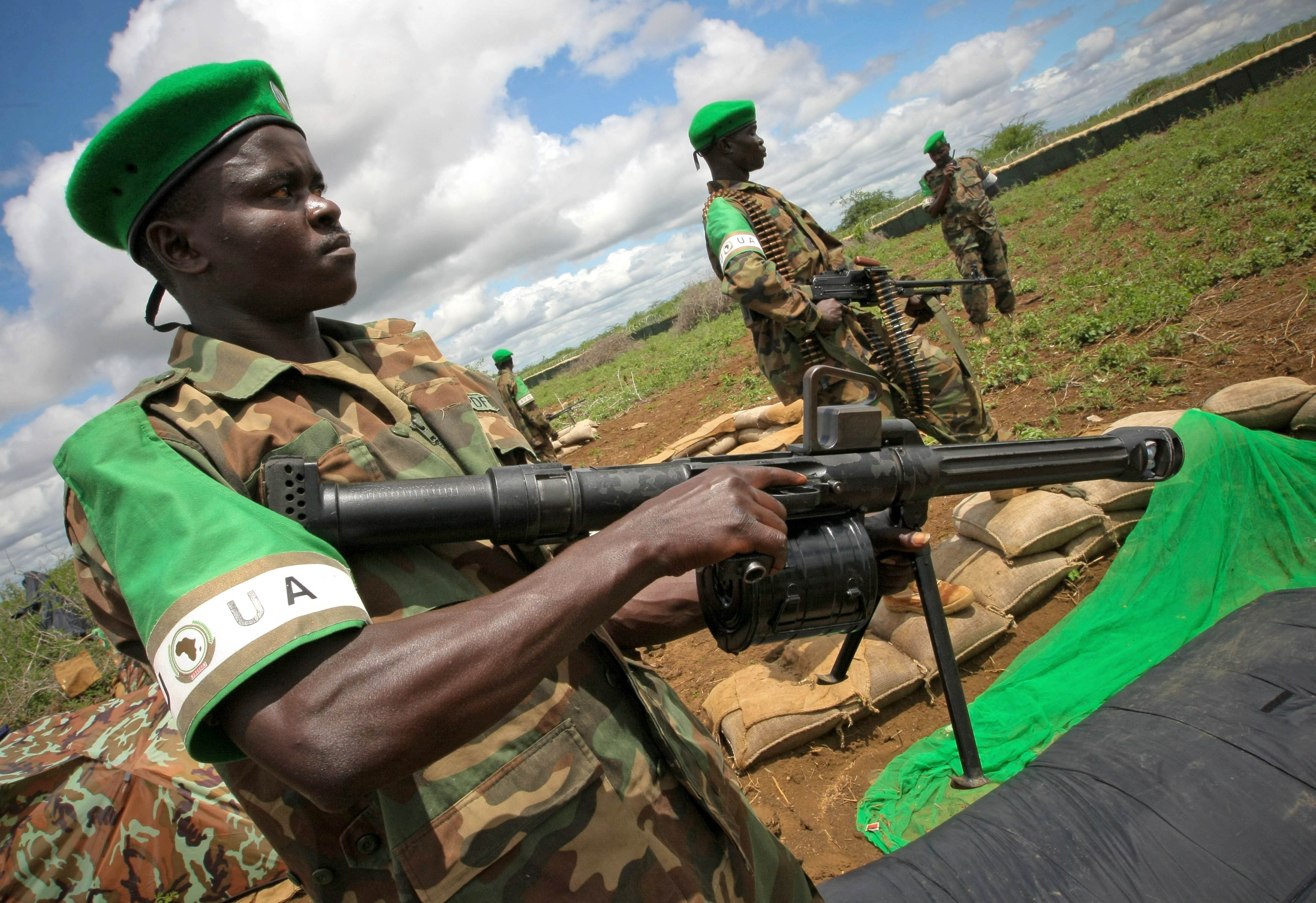
Ugandan AMISOM contingents in patrol

On 31 May 2019, the Security Council unanimously approved United Nations Security Council Resolution 2472, authorising Member States of the African Union to maintain the deployment of AMISOM until 31 May 2020, with a reduction of the number of troops to 19,626 by 28 February 2020.

The Security Council decided [on 29 May] to reauthorize the deployment of African Union Mission in Somalia (AMISOM) personnel for nine months, requiring them to support security in the lead-up to elections and to work towards the gradual hand-over of responsibility to Somali forces by 2021.

== Mission planning ==
=== Scope of the mission ===
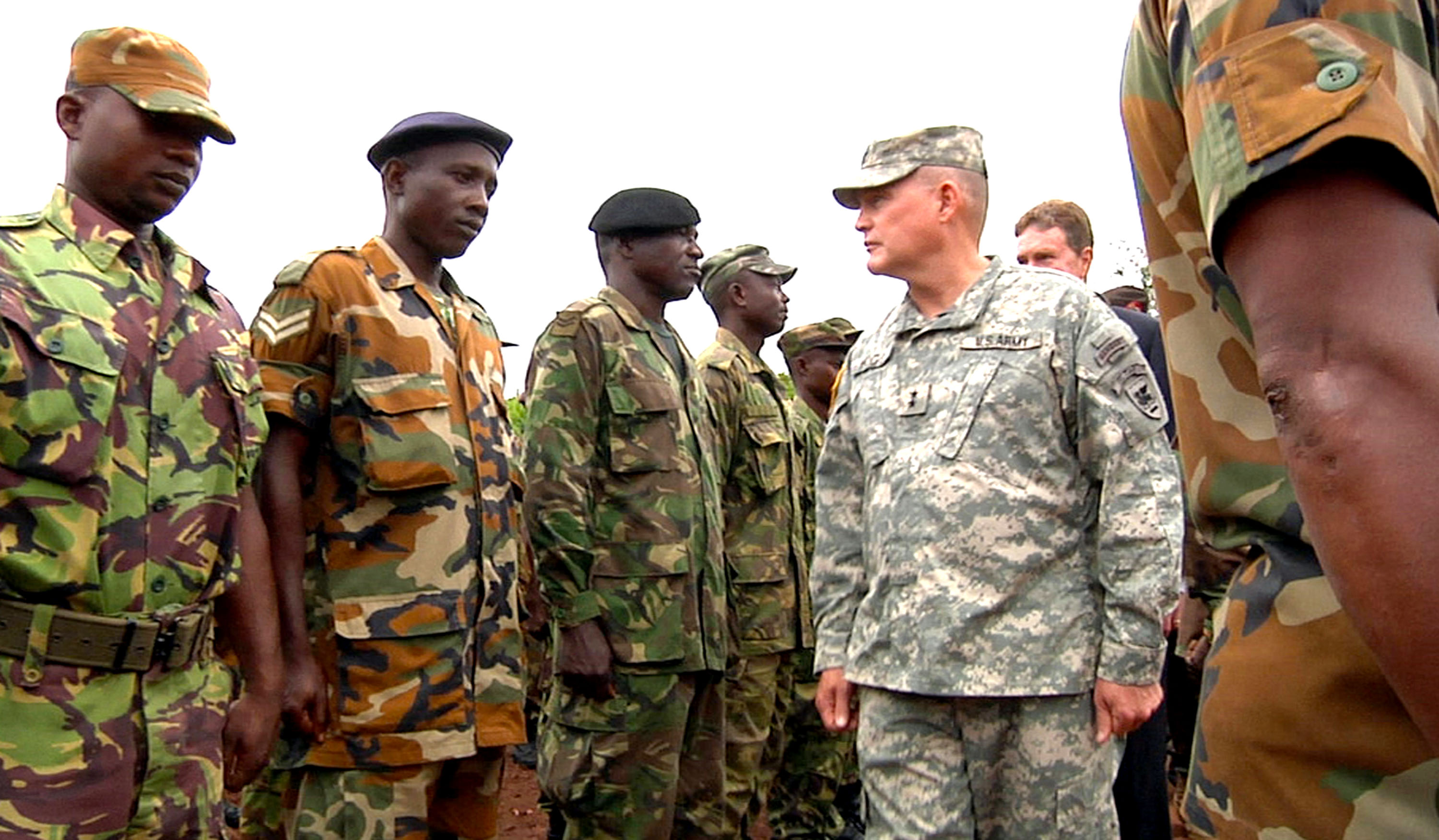
An American officer inspecting troops from Sierra Leone prior to deployment to Somalia, 2012

IGASOM was expected to eventually reach 8,000 troops, with an expected cost of $335 million for the first year. According to UN Security Council Resolution 1725, states bordering Somalia would not be eligible to deploy troops under IGASOM. The remaining (non-bordering) IGAD member nations include Sudan, Eritrea, and Uganda. Because of the objection of the burden falling on these three nations alone (and the rivalry between Ethiopia and Eritrea), the mission was expanded to include other member states of the African Union.

AMISOM has a different composition. As proposed, it comprised an initial three battalions, growing to a total of nine battalions of 850 troops each, which would serve for an initial stabilization period of six months. The mission was to be modelled after the African Union Mission in Burundi (AMIB).

=== ICU resistance ===
Though IGAD and the ICU met and published a cordial and formal communique committing the ICU to the IGAD plans on 2 December, by the time United Nations Security Council Resolution 1725 was passed on 6 December, the ICU was openly and militantly opposed to peacekeepers entering Somalia, and vowed to treat any peacekeepers as hostile forces. Because of regional divisions, there were also UIC resistance to allowing Ethiopian troops be part of the mission. Ethiopia, for its part, was leery of allowing Eritrean troops to be members of the IGAD peacekeeping force.

In the face of ICU threats, Uganda, the only IGAD members who had openly offered to send forces (a battalion), withdrew in the face of concerns of the present feasibility of the mission. In Uganda's defense, the crisis does not allow for peacekeepers when there are active hostilities conducted with heavy weapons (see Battle of Baidoa).

On 1 January 2007, after the defeat of the ICU in various battles in December 2006, Uganda again renewed its pledge of a battalion of troops. Between Uganda and Nigeria (which is a Member State of the African Union, but not of Intergovernmental Authority on Development), there was a pledge of a total of 8,000 peacekeepers. Ghana, Rwanda and Tanzania were reported to be considering sending forces.

=== Gathering support ===
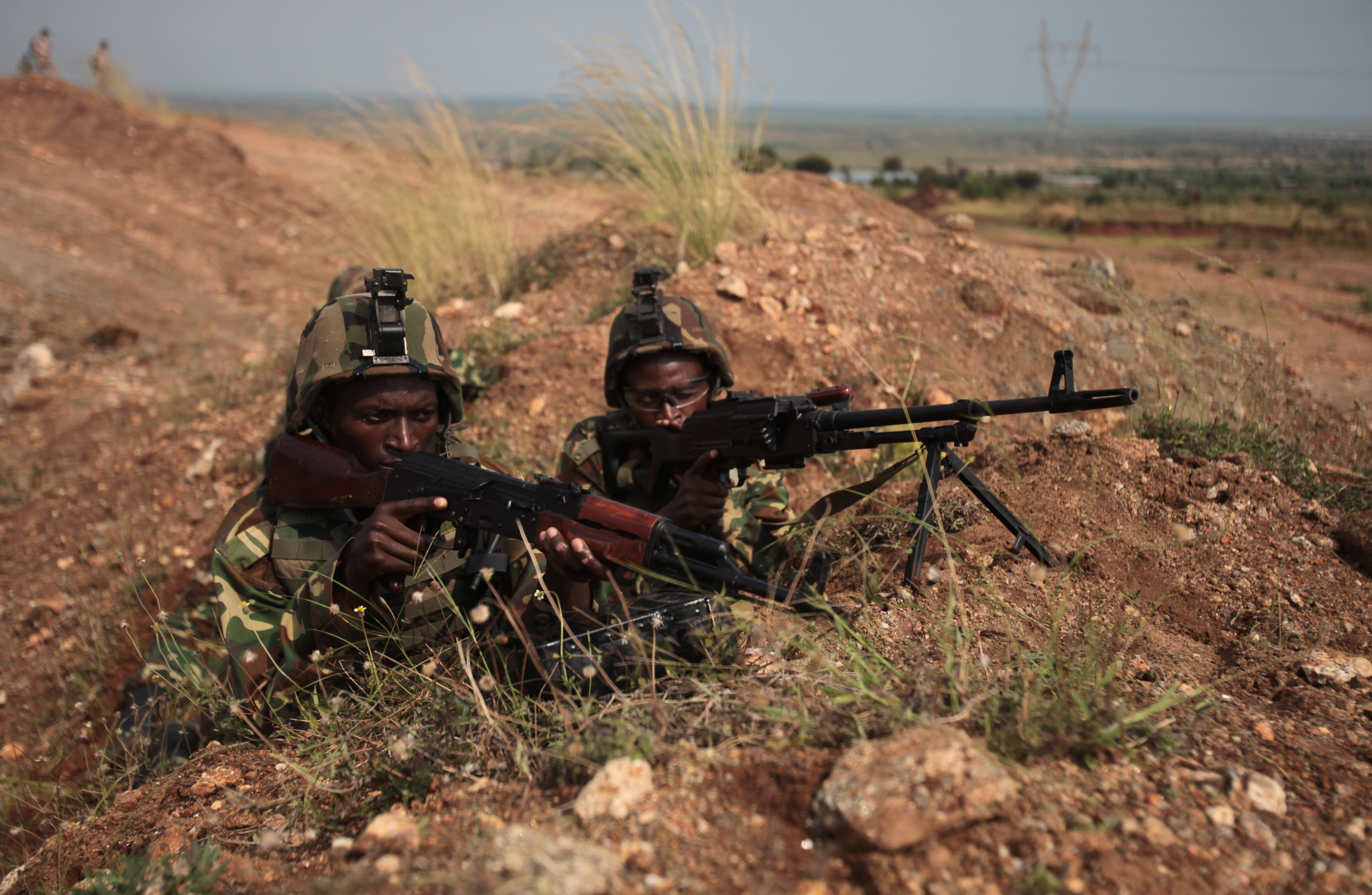
Burundian soldiers training before deployment to Somalia, 2012

Following the defeat of the Islamic Courts Union in December 2006 – January 2007 the international community began to gather both fiscal commitments as well as military forces for the mission. Nations of the African Union (AU) outside the Intergovernmental Authority on Development community were drawn on to provide support.

On 17 January 2007, the US ambassador to Kenya, Michael Ranneberger, said the US pledged $40 million to support the deployment of a peacekeeping force for Somalia. By 20 January, the European Union followed with a pledge of 15 million euros. On 19 January 2007 the mission was formally defined and approved by the African Union at the 69th meeting of the Peace and Security Council. On 22 January 2007 Malawi agreed to send a half-battalion to a battalion (ranging widely anywhere between approximately 400 to 1,200 troops) for a peacekeeping mission to Somalia. On 24 January 2007 Nigeria pledged a battalion (a force between 770 and 1,100 troops) to join the Somali peacekeeping mission.

On 1 February 2007 Burundi committed to the peacekeeping mission, pledging up to 1,000 troops. By 27 March, it was confirmed that 1700 Burundian peacekeepers would be sent to Somalia. On 2 February 2007, the United Nations Security Council welcomed the advent of the African Union and Intergovernmental Authority on Development-led peacekeeping mission. On 5 February 2007 Tanzania offered to train Somali government troops, but not to deploy peacekeepers. On 9 February 2007 a gathering of 800 Somali demonstrators in north Mogadishu, where Islamist support was strongest, burned U.S., Ethiopian, and Ugandan flags in protest of the proposed peacekeeping mission. A masked representative of the resistance group, the Popular Resistance Movement in the Land of the Two Migrations, said Ethiopian troops would be attacked in their hotels; the same group had made a video warning peacekeepers to avoid coming to Somalia. By this date, Uganda, Nigeria, Ghana, Malawi and Burundi had committed to the peacekeeping mission, but the total force was about half of the proposed 8,000-strong force. Uganda had pledged 1,400 troops and some armored vehicles for a mission lasting up to 9 months, and the AU had pledged $11.6 million. On 16 February 2007 Uganda announced it would deploy 1,500 well-seasoned troops as early as Saturday, 17 February 2007 under the command of Major General Levi Karuhanga. Reportedly the troops had been training for two years in preparation for the mission.

== Deployment to Somalia ==
Days before AMISOM deployed in Somalia, violence in Mogadishu began rapidly escalating. On 6 March 2007, the first African Union troops landed at Mogadishu airport alongside three military vehicles.

The Burundian troops were technically ready to go in early August 2007, but equipment promised by the United States and France had not yet arrived. On 23 December 2007, an advance force of 100 Burundians was deployed and another 100 soldiers arrived on 2007-12-24. By late 2008, 1,700 Burundian soldiers were deployed to Mogadishu.

On July 28, 2009, the World Health Organization was notified that 21 AMISOM soldiers in Mogadishu had become sick, and three had died, with acute peripheral edema, difficulty in breathing, palpitations, and fever. The WHO, together with the U.S. Centers for Disease Control, AMISOM, and the Aga Khan University Hospital in Nairobi began an investigation. From April 26, 2009, to May 1, 2010, 241 AU soldiers had lower limb edema and at least one additional symptom; four patients died. At least 52 soldiers were airlifted to hospitals in Kenya and Uganda. Four of 31 hospitalized patients had right-sided heart failure with pulmonary hypertension. The illness was associated with exclusive consumption of food provided to troops (not eating locally acquired foods). Because the syndrome was clinically compatible with wet beriberi, thiamine was administered to affected soldiers, resulting in rapid and dramatic resolution.

=== Expanding role ===
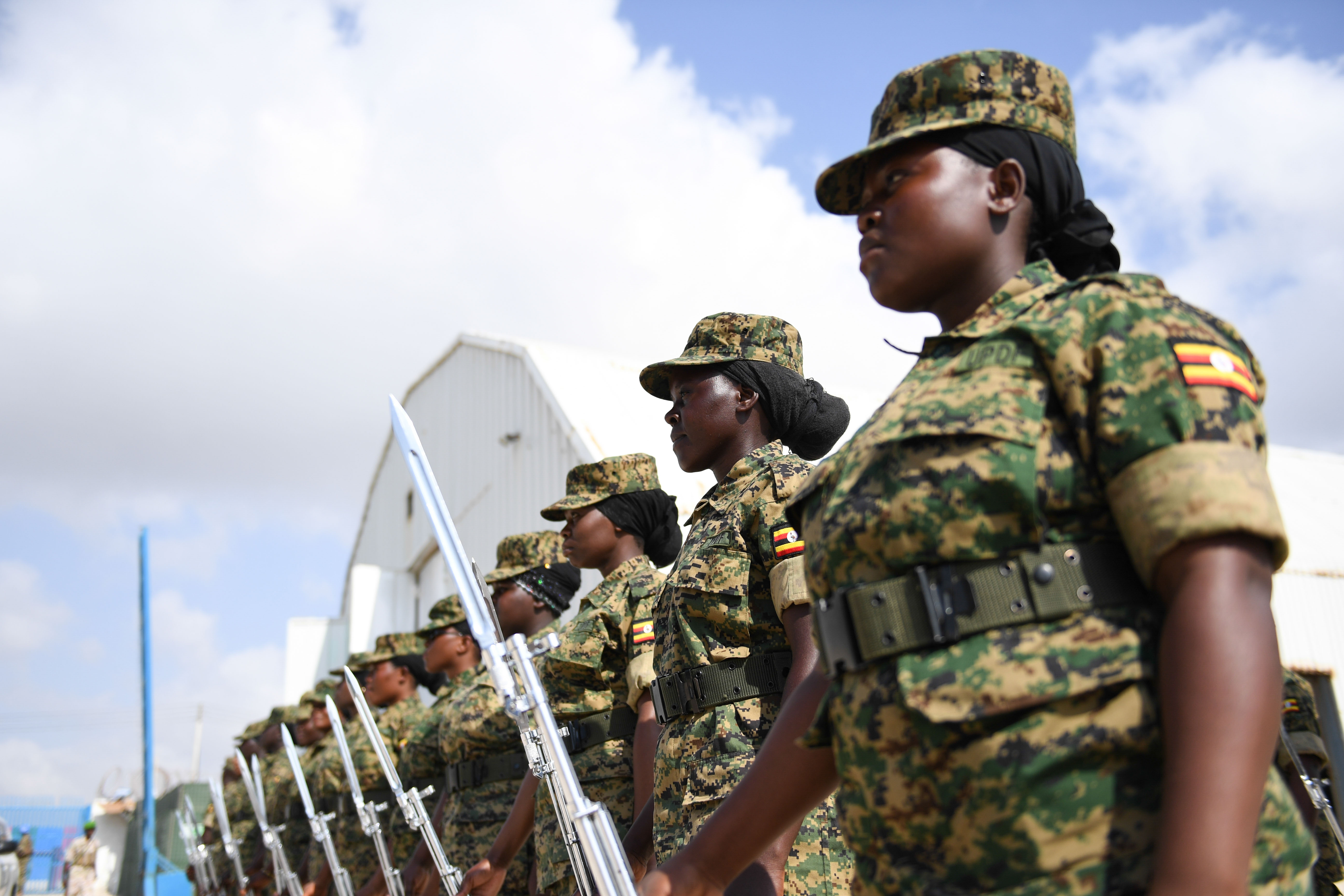
AMISOM soldiers at the 2012 Female Peacekeepers' Conference

In a closed door meeting in Kampala on 22 July 2010, AU ministers agreed to expand the mission's mandate from a peacekeeping focus to a peace-enforcement focus that would engage al-Shabaab more directly. The decision came soon after deadly bomb attacks in the Ugandan capital. A few days later in response to UN pressure, the AU agreed not to expand the mandate but did allow preemptive strikes against Al-Shabaab and promised more troops from other African countries.

On 23 July 2010, Djibouti and Guinea pledged troops to AMISOM. On 17 September 2010, an AU envoy said in Nairobi that AMISOM's size had grown from 6,300 to 7,200 troops after an additional battalion from Uganda joined the force. In December 2010, the UN backed AMISOM in increasing the mission's authorized size to 12,000 – UN Security Council resolution 1964 of 22 December 2010 – and at the same time reports indicated that Uganda had promised an extra 1,800 personnel, with Burundi an extra 850.

In March 2011 Burundi sent 1,000 extra soldiers to AMISOM, bringing the total number of Burundi troops deployed to 4,400. AFP, reported in Africa Research Bulletin, said Burundian military chief General Godefroid Niyombare said on 14 March 2011 the soldiers had been deployed a week before.

In February 2012, the U.N. Security Council boosted the number of troops deployed from 12,000 to 17,731. The approval comes after a series of recent successes against al-Shabaab fighters who had previous positions throughout the central and southern areas of the country. During the same month, AU Commander Fred Mugisha suggested that Al-Shabaab was "at [its] weakest" and would likely "implode in the not so distant future" owing to successive military defeats that it suffered as well as an exodus toward the Arabian Peninsula of hundreds of the group's fighters.

Due to the successful military operations against the Islamists, the United States has also been stepping up efforts to train and equip the AMISOM troops in a bid to stamp out the Al-Shabaab insurgency and limit its influence.

In October 2011, the Kenya Defence Forces began Operation Linda Nchi, crossing the border into Somalia to attack Al-Shabaab. On 12 November, the Kenyan government agreed to rehat its forces under AMISOM command, and later announced in March 2012 that it would send 5,000 troops to join AMISOM.

The East African reported in March 2012 on reorganisation of AMISOM's headquarters and sector commands. Personnel (J1) would be led by the AU, with Kenya taking responsibility for intelligence (J2) and logistics (J4), Uganda operations (J3) and engineer (J8), Burundi plans (J5) and communications/IS (J6), Sierra Leone training (J7), and Djibouti CIMIC (J9). There would also be four sectors: Uganda responsible for Sector One (the Shabelles and Banadir), Sector Two (the Jubbas) run by Kenya, Sector Three Burundi covering GEdo, Bay, and BAkool, and Sector from which Ethiopia forces were withdrawing from to be directed by Djibouti.

On 9 August 2013, an Antonov An-24 operated by the Ethiopian Air Force crashed while attempting to land at Aden Abdulle International Airport in Mogadishu. There were six crew on board, of which four perished and two survived with injuries. The flight departed from Dire Dawa International Airport in Ethiopia at 06:00 local time that morning, commanded by Colonel Berhanu Geremew, a highly experienced pilot. It was carrying a cargo of weapons and ammunition.

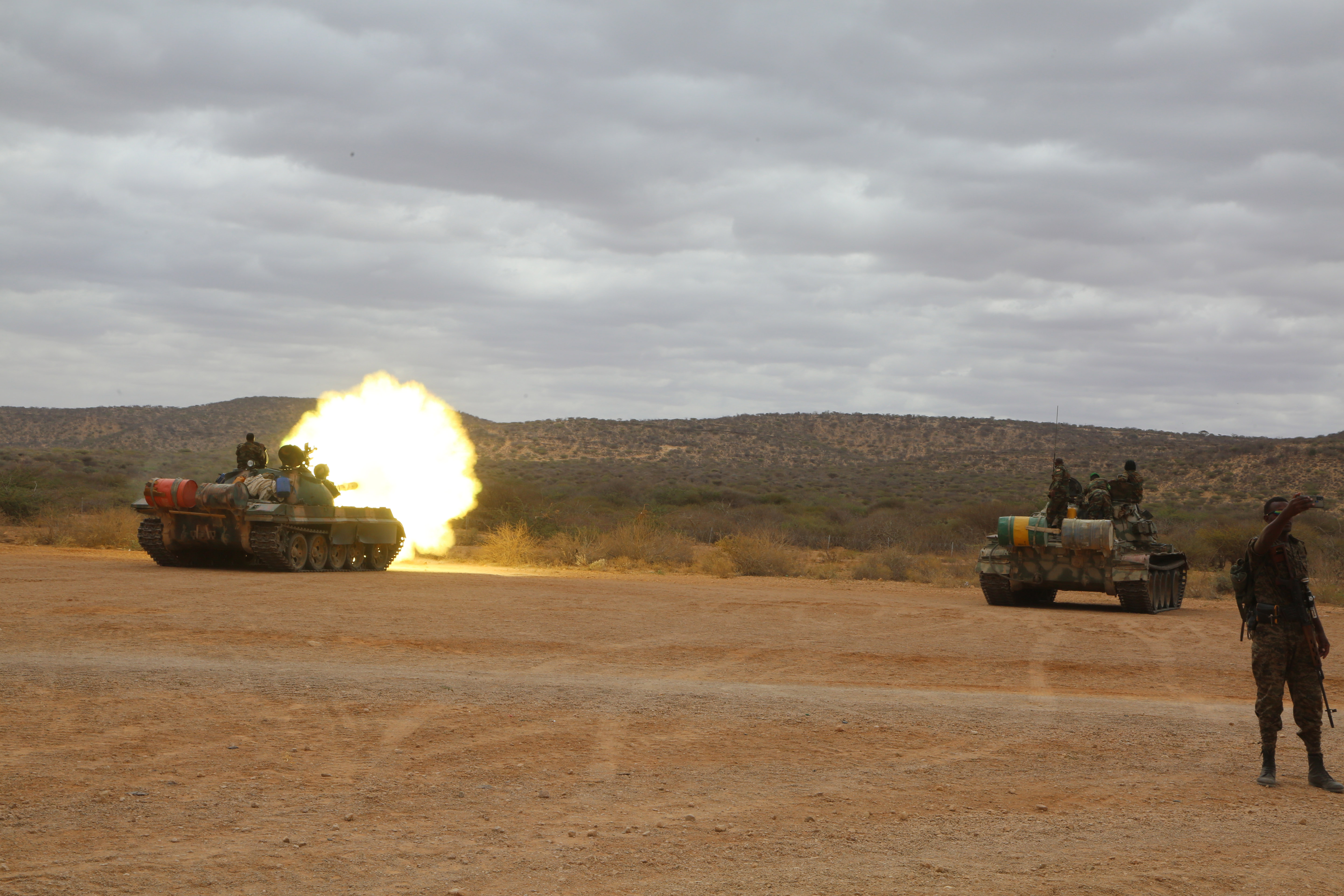
Ethiopian soldiers under AMISOM, training for combat in Beletweyne District, July 2021

In November 2013, the Ethiopian government announced that it would subordinate its troops in Somalia to AMISOM. The Ethiopian authorities' announcement came a month after a failed October bombing attempt by Al-Shabaab in the Ethiopian capital of Addis Ababa, and a week after Ethiopia received a renewed terrorism threat from the insurgent group.

According to Ethiopian Ministry of Foreign Affairs spokesperson Ambassador Dina Mufti, the Ethiopian military's decision to join AMISOM was intended to render the peacekeeping operation more secure. Analysts suggested that the move was primarily motivated by financial considerations, with the Ethiopian forces' operational costs now slated to be under AMISOM's allowance budget. It was hoped that the Ethiopian military's long experience in Somali territory, its equipment such as helicopters, and the potential for closer coordination would help AMISOM and Somali forces advance their territorial gains. On the other hand, there is a certain amount of unease following Ethiopia's entry into AMISOM given local animosity originating from Ethiopia's heavy handed intervention in 2006. There are also fears that Al Shabaab could use Somali animosity towards Ethiopia as a rallying cry and to recruit more members.

In December 2013, the U.S. government established a Military Coordination Cell in Mogadishu. The unit consists of a small team of fewer than five advisers, including planners and communicators between AMISOM and the Somali authorities. It was intended to provide consultative and planning support to allied forces in order to enhance their capacity.

From June 2021 to March 2022, the EU and its allies reimbursed Kenya nearly Sh2.54 billion, in quarterly disbursements Sh811 million, for its continued military participation in AMISOM. The funding had slowly been decreasing since it began in October 2011, with each soldier taking home only around USD $800 (Sh92,800) in this final installment.

== Leadership and command ==
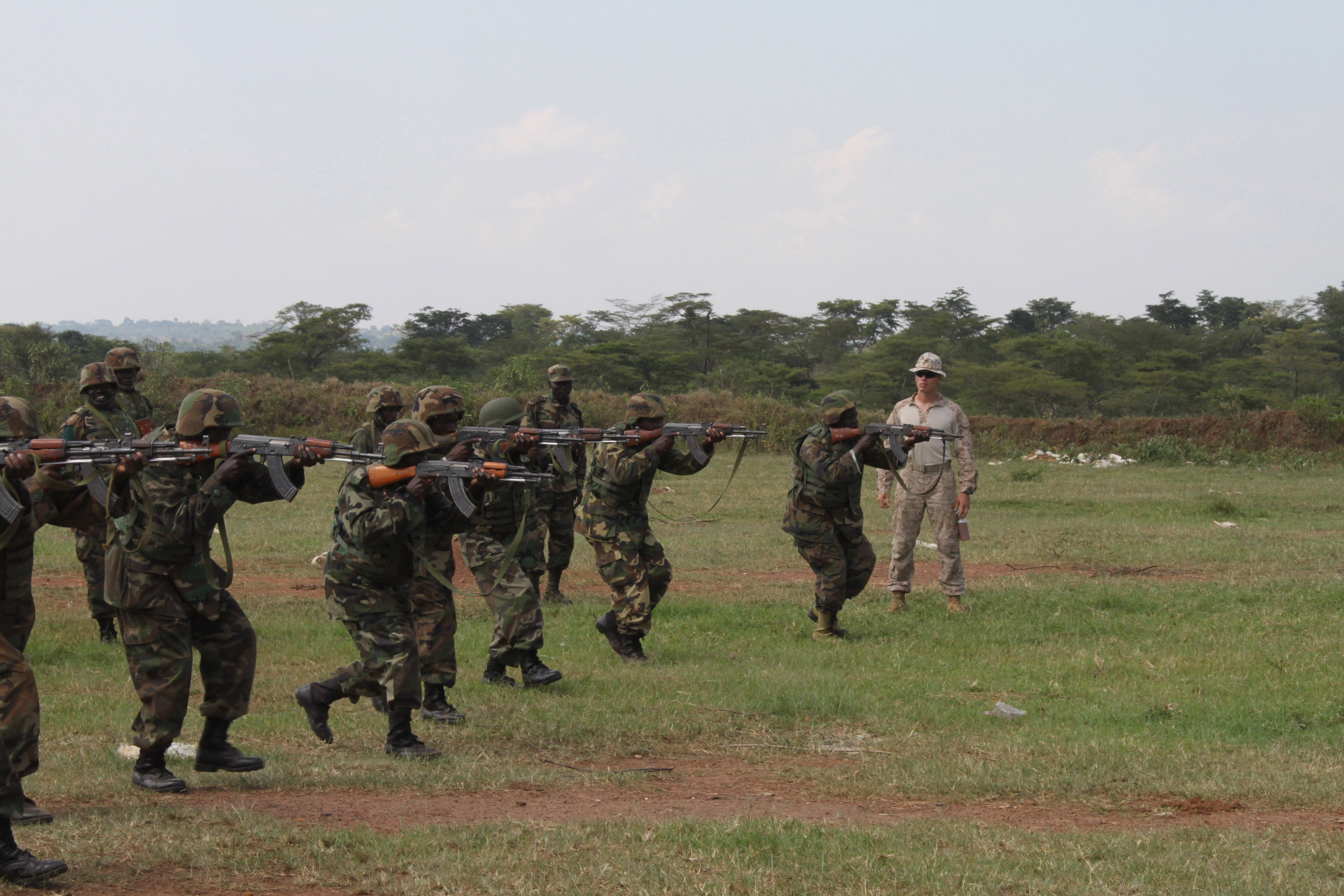
Ugandan troops training, 2012

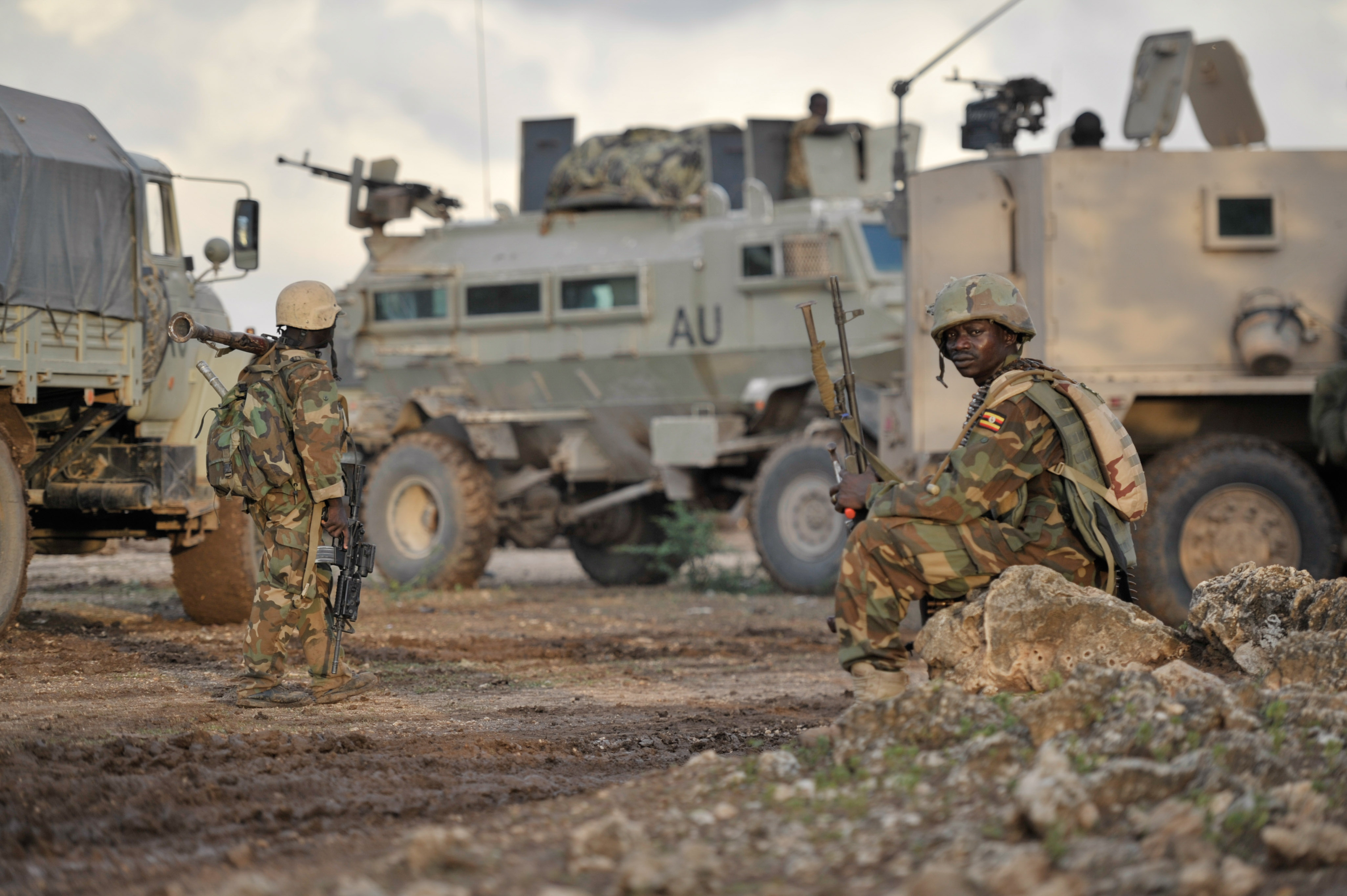
An AU contingent pauses during combat operations against Al-Shabaab in Lower Shebelle.

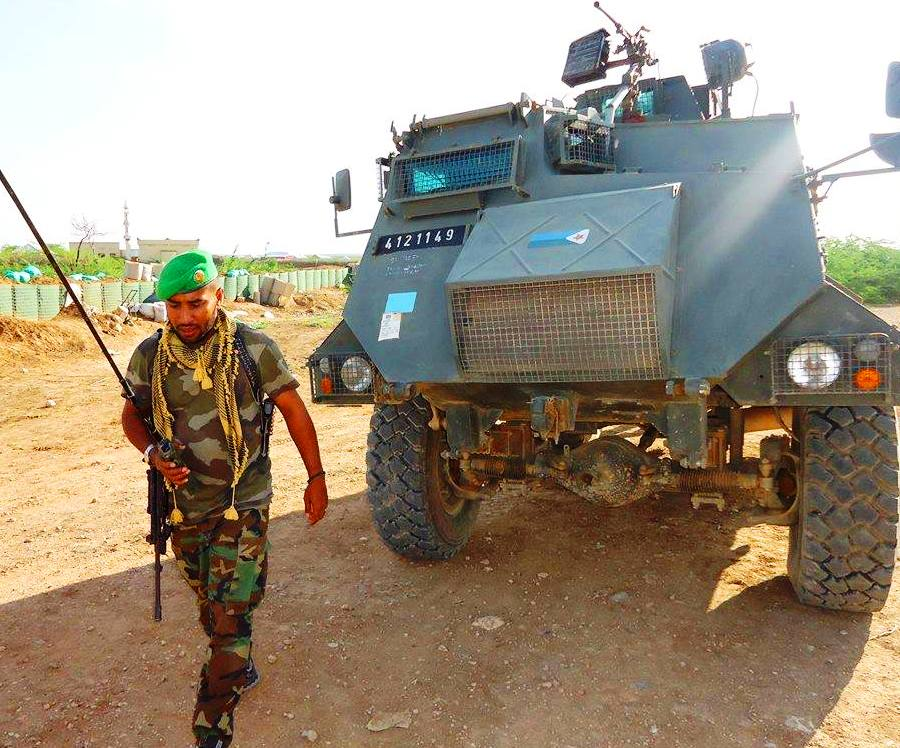
Djiboutian soldier patrolling the base in Beledweyne, Somalia

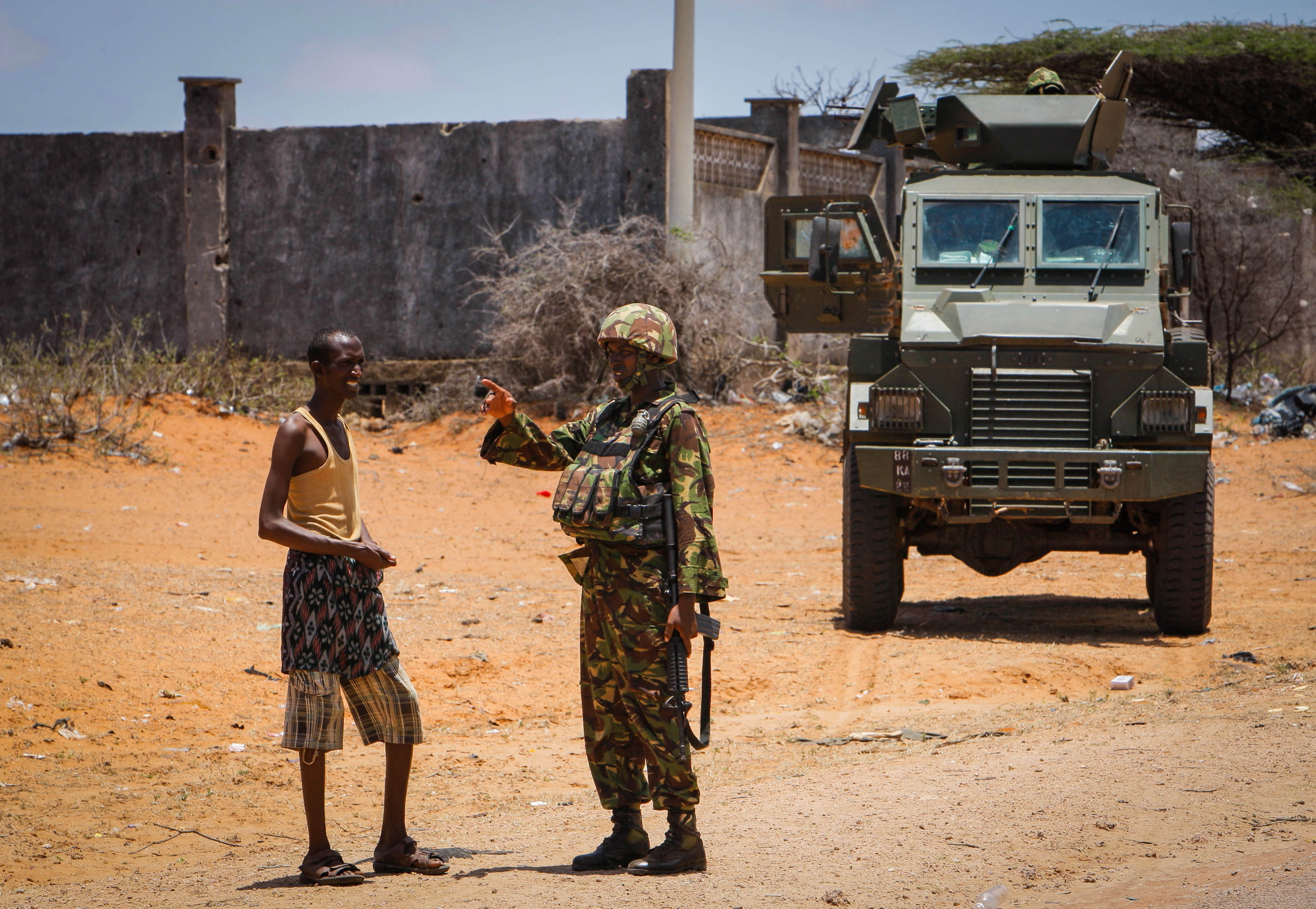
A Kenyan soldier speaks to a Somali with a PUMA M26-15 during an AMISOM operation.

The head of mission was the special representative of the chairperson of the African Union Commission to Somalia, or SRCC. On 7 October 2015, Francisco Caetano Jose Madeira, of Mozambique, was appointed to this position, replacing Maman Sambo Sidikou of Niger.

=== Force commanders ===
No.	Name	Nationality	From	To	Note
1	Maj. Gen. Levi Karuhanga	Uganda	14 February 2007	3 March 2008	
2	Maj. Gen. Francis Okello	Uganda	3 March 2008	7 July 2009	
3	Maj. Gen. Nathan Mugisha	Uganda	7 July 2009	15 June 2011	
4	Maj. Gen. Fredrick Mugisha	Uganda	15 June 2011	2 May 2012	
5	Lt. Gen. Andrew Gutti	Uganda	3 May 2012	16 December 2013	
6	Lt. Gen. Silas Ntigurirwa	Burundi	16 December 2013	15 December 2014	
7	Lt. Gen. Jonathon Kipkemoi Rono	Kenya	December 2014	23 December 2015	
	Maj. Gen. Nakibus Lakara	Uganda	December 2015		Temporarily acting in role
	Maj. Gen. Mohamedesha Zeyinu	Ethiopia	March 2016		Temporarily acting in role
8	Lt. Gen. Osman Noor Soubagleh	Djibouti	18 July 2016	31 January 2018	
9	Lt. Gen. Jim Beesigye Owoyesigire	Uganda	31 January 2018	31 January 2019	
10	Lt. Gen. Tigabu Yilma Wondimhunegn	Ethiopia	31 January 2019	August 2020	
11	Lt. Gen. Diomede Ndegeya	Burundi	August 2020	December 2021	

=== Deputy Force commanders ===
No.	Name	Nationality	From	To	Note
1	Maj. Gen. Juvenal Niyoyunguruza	Burundi	December 2007	August 2009	Killed in suicide bomb blast at AMISOM headquarters on 17 September 2009.
2	Maj. Gen. Cyprien Hakiza	Burundi	August 2009	April 2010	
3	Maj. Gen. Maurice Gateretse	Burundi	April 2010	June 2010	
4	Maj. Gen. Audace Nduwumunsi	Burundi	June 2010		
5a	Maj. Gen. Salvatore Harushimana	Burundi			Deputy Force Commander (Support)
5b	Maj. Gen. Simon N. Karanja	Kenya	9 April 2012	December 2013	Deputy Force Commander (Operations & Plans)
6a	Maj. Gen. Francis Kimeu Nthenge	Kenya	27 November 2013	September 2014	Deputy Force Commander (Support & Logistics)
6b	Maj. Gen. Geoffrey Baraba Muheesi	Uganda	27 November 2013		Deputy Force Commander (Operations & Plans)
7a	Maj. Gen. Nakibus Lakara	Uganda	April 2015	28 October 2016 but then remained until 10 April 2017	Deputy Force Commander (Logistical Support)
7b	Maj. Gen. Mohammed Esha Zeyinu	Ethiopia		30 September 2016	Deputy Force Commander (Operations & Plans)
8a	Maj. Gen. Salvator Harushimana	Burundi	10 April 2017		Deputy Force Commander (Administration & Logistics)
8b	Maj. Gen. Abreha Tesfay	Ethiopia	1 October 2016		Deputy Force Commander (Operations & Plans)
9a	Maj. Gen. Maurice Gateretse	Burundi		incumbent, December 2018	Deputy Force Commander (Support & Logistics)
9b	Maj. Gen. Charles Tai Gituai	Kenya	February 2018	February 2019	Deputy Force Commander (Operations & Plans)
10a	Maj. Gen. George Owinow	Kenya	incumbent, September 2020		Deputy Force Commander (Support & Logistics)
10b	Lt. Gen. James Nakibus Lakara	Uganda	February 2019		Deputy Force Commander (Operations & Plans)
11a	Maj. Gen. Gerbi Kebede Regassa	Ethiopia	January 2021	December 2021	Deputy Force Commander (Support & Logistics)
11b	Maj. Gen. William Kitsao Shume	Kenya	incumbent, March 2021	incumbent	Deputy Force Commander (Operations & Plans)

=== Chiefs of Staff ===
No.	Name	Nationality	From	To	Note
1	Col. Emmanuel Musinguzi	Uganda	2007	?	Initially this position was that of Chief Administration Officer for AMISOM.
2	Col. Innocent Oula	Uganda	2010?	2011?	
3	Col. Simon Ocha	Uganda			
4	Maj. Gen. Osman-Noor Soubagleh	Djibouti	mid-2012	2013	The position was elevated to Force Chief of Staff in mid-2012, following the expansion of AMISOM through the inclusion of KDF forces.
5	Brig. Gen. Cyprien Ndikuriyo	Burundi	2014		
6	Brig. Gen. Ayub Guantai Matiiri	Kenya			
7	Brig. Gen. Kittila Bulti Tadesse	Ethiopia			
8	Brig. Gen. Kabisa Domitien	Burundi			
9	Brig. Gen. Bob Paciesky Ogik	Uganda	incumbent, May 2021		

=== Spokespersons ===
No.	Name	Nationality	From	To
1	Capt. Paddy Ankunda	Uganda	March 2007	February 2008
2	Maj. Barigye Ba-Hoku	Uganda	February 2008	3 May 2011
3	Lt. Col. Paddy Ankunda	Uganda	3 May 2011	8 July 2012
4	Col. Ali Aden Houmed	Djibouti	8 July 2012	December 2014
5	Lt. Col. Paul Njuguna	Kenya	16 March 2015	April 2016?
6	Lt. Col. Joe Kibet	Kenya	April 2016	April 2017?
7	Lt. Col. Wilson Rono	Kenya	April 2017	April 2018
8	Lt. Col. Richard Omwega	Kenya	April 2018	incumbent

== Force organisation ==
=== Sectors ===
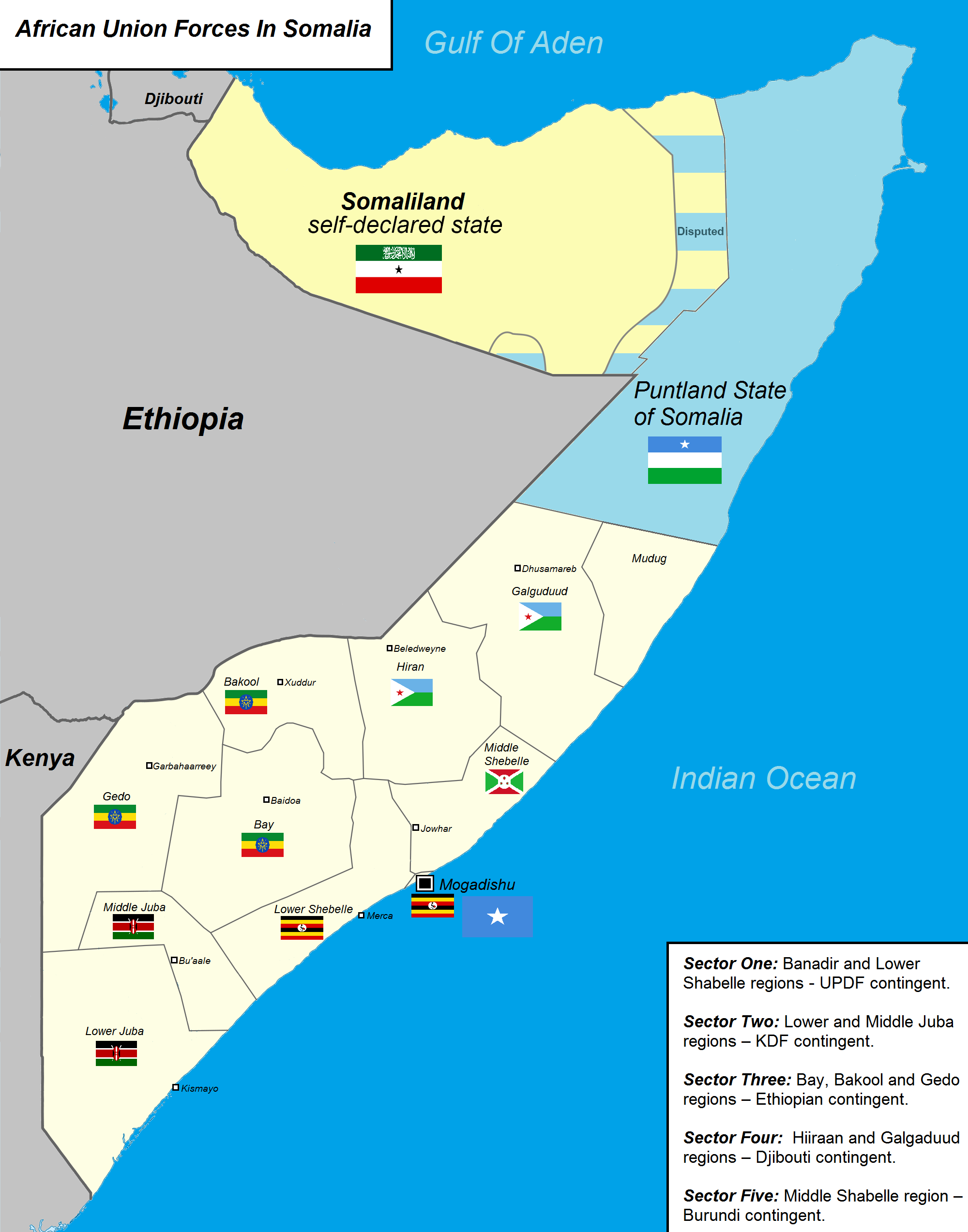
Extent of AMISOM forces in Somalia

On 15 October 2011 Kenyan forces crossed the border into Somalia to attack al-Shebaab. Subsequently, UN Security Council resolution 2036 of 22 February 2012 authorized an increase in AMISOM troop numbers to 17,731 to incorporate the Kenyans. This resolution took effect from mid-2012. At this time the initial Ugandan and Burundian AMISOM forces had been successful in largely clearing al-Shebaab militants from Mogadishu and the force was organized into new sectors.

- Sector 1 (headquartered in Mogadishu and predominantly the domain of the Ugandan Contingent) covered the Banadir, Middle Shabelle and Lower Shabelle regions.
- Sector 2 (headquartered in Kismayu and predominantly KDF responsibility, with the anticipated Sierra Leone contingent) covered the Gedo, Middle Juba and Lower Juba regions.
- Sector 3 (headquartered in Baidoa and predominantly the responsibility of the Burundian contingent) covering the Bay and Bakool regions.
- Sector 4 (headquartered in Belet Weyne and the responsibility of the Djiboutian contingent) covering the Hiraan region.

Later, UN Security Council resolution 2124 of 12 November 2013 authorized a troop increase to 22,126 through inclusion of an Ethiopian contingent. This took effect in January 2014, when the Sector organisation was modified to:

- Sector 1 (Mogadishu: Banadir and Lower Shabelle regions) – UPDF contingent
- Sector 2 (Dobhey: Lower and Middle Juba regions) – KDF contingent, with the Sierra Leone contingent operating in a 'Sector Kismayu' until these forces left. During January 2016 Ethiopian troops deployed to Kismayo.
- Sector 3 (Baidoa: Bay, Bakool and Gedo regions) – Ethiopian contingent
- Sector 4 (Belet Weyne: Hiiraan region) – Djiboutian contingent
- Sector 5 (Jowhar: Middle Shabelle region) – Burundi contingent

In January 2017 Kismayo was mentioned as a separate sector – Sector 6 – under Colonel Paul Njema. On 22 November 2017 AMISOM's twitter feed announced that Colonel Fréderic Ndayisaba of Burundi was replacing Colonel Paul K Njema of the Kenya Defence Forces (KDF) as Sector 6 Commander and described this command as a multinational sector composed of Burundian, Kenyan and Ethiopian troops based in Kismayo.

=== Contingents ===
==== Ugandan contingents ====
a. Commanders

No.	Name	From	To	Note
1	Col. Peter Elwelu	March 2007	February 2008	With Col. Kyazze
2	Col. Godfrey Golooba	February 2008		
3	Col. Jack Bakusumba	December 2008	September 2009	
4	Col. Tumusiime Katsigazi	September 2009	18 June 2010	
5	Col. Michael Ondoga	18 June 2010	3 May 2011	
6	Brig. Gen. Paul Lokech	3 May 2011	November 2012	
7	Brig. Gen. Michael Ondoga	November 2012	23 September 2013	
	Brig. Gen. Deus Sande	23 September 2013	25 September 2013	Acting in role
8	Brig. Gen. Dick Olum	25 September 2013	October 2014	
9	Brig. Gen. Sam Kavuma	October 2014	29 November 2015	
10	Brig. Gen. Sam Okiding	30 November 2015	3 January 2017	
11	Brig. Gen. Kayanja Muhanga	3 January 2017	19 December 2017	
12	Brig. Gen. Paul Lokech	19 December 2017	21 December 2018	
13	Brig. Gen. Michael Kabango	21 December 2018		
14	Brig. Gen. Richard Otto			
15	Brig. Gen. Don Nabasa		December 2021	
16	Brig. Gen. Keith Katungi	December 2021	incumbent	

b. Battle groups

From the first deployment of Ugandan troops during March 2007—which saw a contingent of two battalions sent to Mogadishu—the UPDF contribution to AMISOM had by 2015 expanded to three battle groups, each of two or three battalions. The following table lists what details are known of the Ugandan battle groups, or 'Ugabag', deployed under AMISOM. The information presented has been collected from Ugandan press reports (largely gleaned from the website 'Allafrica.com') and news reports on the AMISOM website.

Battle Group	Commander	Arr. Somalia	Dep. Somalia	Strength	Composition	Notes
Ugabag I	Col. Peter Elwelu	March 2007		1,700	One infantry battalion (Col. Peter Elwelu) and one Armour/ Motorised Infantry battalion (Col. Kyazze)	Lost five personnel?
Ugabag II		December 2007	November 2008	97 officers and 1,600 other ranks	Two battalions?	Lost 3 soldiers with 11 wounded during 11-month deployment, although in total nine Ugandans and one Burundian died during the deployment.
Ugabag III	Col. Jackson Bakasumba	November/ December 2008	August/ September 2009	1,700		
Ugabag IV	Col. Tumusiime Katsigazi	September 2009		1,703	Two battalions?	
Ugabag V		May 2010?		1,650	Two battalions?	
Ugabag VI	Col. Ondogu although also given as Lt. Col. Francis Chemo	April 2010?	January 2011		Included 23 Bn (Lt. Col. Patrick Tibihwa, KIA Jun 2011) and possibly also 19 Bn (Lt. Col. Anthony Lukwayo Mbuusi) and 69 Bn (Lt. Col. John Mugarula).	Nine-month deployment. Lost ten personnel with 30 injured Heavily involved in the battle for Mogadishu.
Ugabag VII	Lt. Col. Justus Besisira	January 2011		1,800	Two battalions?	
Ugabag VIII	Col. Kayanja Muhanga				7 Bn, 29 Bn and 33 Bn	Participated in Operation Free Shabelle, the May 2012 advance to Afgooye.
Ugabag IX	Col. Stephen Mugerwa, or Lt. Col. Frederick Akiiki Rugadya, or Lt. Col. Eugine Ssebugwawo	April 2012	May 2013	1,500 but also given as 2,369		Participated in Operation Free Shabelle, the May 2012 advance to Afgooye. Reinforced? by Ugabag IX+ (Col. Stephen Mugerwa) which included 342 Bn (Lt. Col. John Katongole).
Ugabag X	Col. Edison Muwaguzi (or Muhanguzi), later charged and demoted		October 2013		25 Bn (Maj. Sentamu), 39 Bn (Lt. Col. Wamale), 45 Bn (Maj. Ruziro)	Replaced Ugabag 8.
Ugabag XI	Col. Joseph Balikudembe	January 2013	February 2014	1,700		Replaced Ugabag 9. Reinforced by 'Ugabag XI+' under Col. Hassan Kimbowa from May 2013?
Ugabag XII	Col. Emmy Mulindwa	September/ October 2013	October/ November 2014	2,930	37 Bn (Maj. Lugira), 43 Bn (Maj. Ankankunda) and 61 Bn (Maj. Ojuga)	Lost 17 personnel. Participated in Operation Indian Ocean, the August–October 2014 advance to Barawe.
Ugabag XIII	Col. William Bainomugisha, then Col. Ben Sserwada	February 2014	June 2015			
Ugabag XIV	Col. Frank Kyambadde	October/ November 2014	November/ December 2015	2,754		Lost 22 personnel. Based at Barawe. Replaced Ugabag XII.
Ugabag XV	Col. Silvio Aguma		April 2016		35 Bn (Lt. Col. Paul Muhanguzi)	Based at Arbiska. New battle group, making three in the UPDF contingent.
Ugabag XVI	Col. Bosco Mutambi then Col. Peter Omola Gatilano	June 2015	July 2016	1,400	Included 13 Bn (Maj. Mwesigye)	Battle group headquartered at Marka. Company base near Janaale was overrun by al-Shabab on 1 September 2015, soon after the battle group's deployment to Somalia. Nineteen Ugandan troops were killed, one captured, and 22 injured. This led to the replacement of the battle group commander and a later Board of Inquiry.
Ugabag XVII	Col. Bob Ogik	November 2015	December 2016	2,777		Based at Barawe. Replaced Ugabag XIV.
Ugabag XVIII	Col. Ronald Bigirwa	March/ April 2016	April 2017			Based at Arbiska. Replaced Ugabag XV.
Ugabag XIX	Col. Anthony Mbuusi Lukwago	July 2016	July 2017			Operated in the Marka area. Replaced Ugabag XVI.
Ugabag XX	Col. Bernerd Arinaitwe Tuhaise (Tuhame)	December 2016	November 2017	2,745	7 Bn, 69 Bn and one other	Replaced Ugabag XVII.
Ugabag XXI	Col. Chris Ogwal	April 2017	April 2018			Replaced Ugabag XVIII.
Ugabag XXII		July 2017			1 Bn and 19 Bn (Lt. Col. Robert Nahamya)	Replaced Ugabag XIX in the Marka area. Later reported to be headquartered at Ceeljaale.
Ugabag XXIII	Col. Eriazile Zake Okolong	November/ December 2017	December 2018	2,400		
Ugabag XXIV	Col. Jackson Kayanja					
Ugabag XXV	Col. Paul Muwanguzi (or Muhanguzi)	July 2018	July 2019	1,406		Replaced Ugabag XXII
Ugabag XXVI	Col. Topher Magino					To replace Ugabag XXIII.
Ugabag XXVII	Col. Sam Kosiya Kutesa		September 2020			
Ugabag XXVIII	Col. Wilberforce Sserunkuma	July 2019				Replacing Ugabag XXV
Ugabag XXIX	Col. Edward Kaddu	December 2019	April 2021			
Ugabag XXX	Col. Jimmy Nabiyu Musoke	September 2020		1,800		
Ugabag XXXI	Col. Francis Aragmoi		December 2021?			
Ugabag XXXII	Col. Jonathan Ojok Ochom	April 2021				Replaced Uganda Battle Group XXIX.
Ugabag XXXIII		August 2021		1,848		To replace Uganda Battle Group XXX.

==== Burundi contingents ====
a. Commanders

No.	Commander	From	To
1	Brig. Gen. Juvenal Niyoyunguruza	December 2007	June 2009
2	Brig. Gen. Prime Niyongabo	June 2009	June 2010
3	Brig. Gen. Maurice Gateretse	June 2010	July 2011
4	Col. Oscar Nzohabonimana	July 2011	June 2012
5	Col. Geard Bigirimana	June 2012	July 2013
6	Col. Jean Luc Habarugira	July 2013	
7	Col. Reverien Ndayambaje		
8	Col. Venant Bibonimana		June 2016
9	Brig. Gen. Venuste Nduwayo	July 2016	
10	Brig. Gen. Victor Nduwumukiza		June 2018
11	Brig. Gen. Leonidas Niyungeko	June 2018	
12	Brig. Gen. Richard Banyakimbona		incumbent, September 2019
13	Brig. Gen. Telesphore Barandereka	January 2021?	December 2021

b. Battalions

Burundi sent its first battalion to Mogadishu to join Ugandan troops in AMISOM in December 2007. It took until October 2008 to build the national contingent up to two battalions, due in part to a lack of equipment. But subsequently the Burundi contingent increased to a six battalion force. The Burundi force commitment is frequently cited as 5432 troops, which would align with a contingent of six battalions (of about 850 personnel each, the UN 'standard') together with headquarters and support elements.

- 1 Battalion. Arrived December 2007.
- 2 Battalion. Deployed mid-October 2008.

...

- 7 Battalion (Lt. Col. Pontien Hakizimana). Served during 2011 and involved in the Battle for Mogadishu.
- 8 Battalion
- 9 Battalion (Lt. Col. Pascal Hakizimana). Served during 2011 and involved in the Battle for Mogadishu.
- 10 Battalion (Lt. Col. Egide Nitabara). Served during 2011 and involved in the Battle for Mogadishu.
- 11 Battalion (Lt. Col. Gregoire Ndikumazambo). Served during 2011 and involved in the Battle for Mogadishu.
- 12 Battalion (Lt. Col. Richard Bimenyimana). Served during 2011 and involved in the Battle for Mogadishu.

...

- 26 Battalion. Returned home at the end of May 2015.
- 27 Battalion. Returned home at the end of May 2015.
- 28 Battalion. Returned home in October 2015 after 14 month deployment.
- 29 Battalion. Returned home in November 2015; replaced by 35 Battalion.
- 30 Battalion. Returned home in November 2015; replaced by 36 Battalion.
- 31 Battalion, 828 personnel. Returned home 28 May 2016.
- 32 Battalion (Maj. John Manirakiza). Returned home during July 2016 after year-long deployment.
- 33 Battalion (Maj. Richard Nikoyagize). Returned home during July 2016 after year-long deployment.
- 34 Battalion (Maj. Sylvain Kinigi). Deployed October 2015 (replacing 28 Battalion?) and returned home February 2017.
- 35 Battalion. Deployed November 2015, replacing 29 Battalion?
- 36 Battalion. Deployed November 2015, replacing 30 Battalion?
- 37 Battalion (Maj. Adolphe Kaguruka). Deployed May 2016, replacing 31 Battalion? Returned home June 2017.
- 38 Battalion, 850 personnel. Deployed July 2016, replacing 32 Battalion
- 39 Battalion, 850 personnel. Deployed July 2016, replacing 33 Battalion

40, 41 and 42 Battalions were scheduled for deployment in November 2016 but this was delayed. There was speculation this delay was a result of disappointment within Burundi over delays in EU payments in support of AMISOM and the suggestion by the EU that payments could be made directly to the Burundian troops rather than through the Burundi government; or domestic political tensions within Burundi arising from the president running for a third term of office. By January 2017 the Burundi government threatened to withdraw its forces from Somalia altogether, arguing that these were a national contingent and not mere mercenaries, as would be suggested by the troops receiving payment directly from any third party. Subsequently agreement was reached on the question of EU payments and it was announced the Burundi contingents would remain with AMISOM in Somalia.

- 40 Battalion (Maj. Leonidas Nsingirankabo, also given as Maj. Ladislas Singirankabo). Deployed February 2017, replacing 34 Battalion, and departed in March 2018.
- 41 Battalion (Maj. Zenon Ntisinzira).
- 42 Battalion
- 43 Battalion (Maj. Chartier Nyandwi). Deployed June 2017, replacing 37 Battalion.
- 44 Battalion
- 45 Battalion (Lt. Col. Philbert Hatungimana). Arrived in Somalia August 2017, replacing 39 Battalion, and to be deployed to Jowhar.

...

- 55 Battalion. Deployed November 2019 and ended tour in May 2021, after an extension due to the Covid-19 'pandemic'.
- 56 Battalion Deployed November 2019 and ended tour in May 2021, after an extension due to the Covid-19 'pandemic'.

==== Ethiopian contingents ====
No.	Name	Took command	Left command
1	Brig. Gen. Gebremedhin Fikadu Hailu	January 2014	

==== Kenyan contingents ====
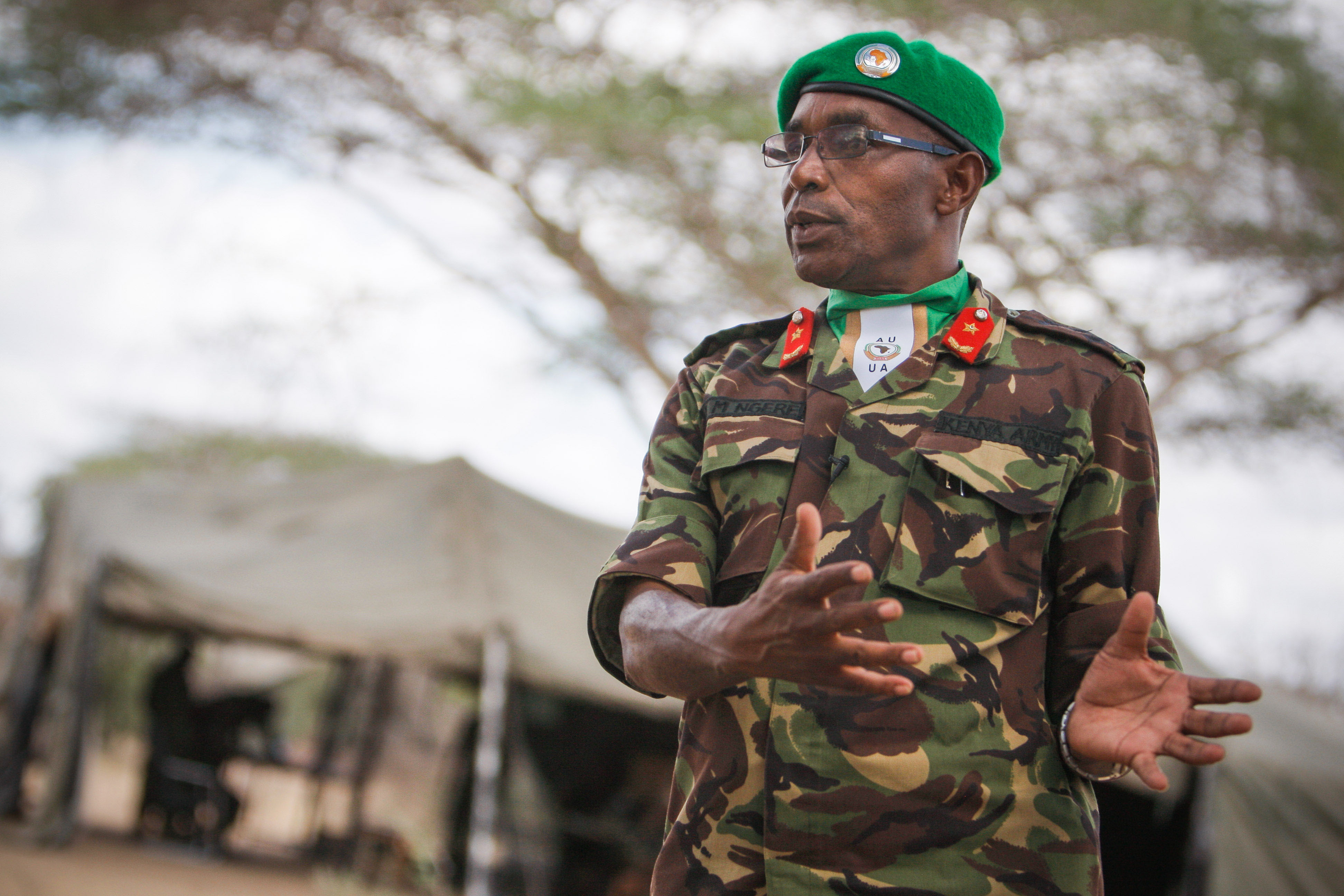
Brig. Gen. Ngere in Dhobley, Somalia, September 2012

Contingent/ Sector 2 commanders

No.	Name	From	To
1	Brig. Gen. Anthony Mukundi Ngere	July 2012	December 2013
2	Brig. Gen. Walter Koipaton Raria	December 2013	mid-2015
3	Brig. Gen. Daniel C Bartonjo	mid-2015	
4	Brig. Gen. William Shume		
5	Brig. Gen. Joakim Mwamburi		
6	Brig. Gen. Dickson Ruto		February 2020
7	Brig. Gen. Paul Njema	February 2020	
8	Brig. Gen. Jeff Nyagah		24 Feb 2022
9	Brig. Gen. Jattani Gula	24 Feb 2022	incumbent

==== Djiboutian contingents ====
a. Sector 4 Commander

No.	Commander	Period	Notes
1	Col. Abdourahman Abdi Dhembil		Responsible for Sector 4, headquartered in Belet Weyne and covering Hiiraan and Galgaduud regions.
2	Col. Mohamed Ibrahim Moussa	February 2019 to February 2020	
3	Col. Abdirahman Riyale Hared	Incumbent, January 2021	
4	Col. Hassan Jama Farah	Incumbent, February 2022	Deputy Commander Col. Yeshiwas Kerbet.

b. Djibouti Contingent Commander

No.	Commander	Took command	Left command	Notes
1	Col. Osman Doubad	December 2011		Col. Osman Doubad is given as Contingent Commander as late as January 2016.
2	Col. Hassan Jama Farah	Incumbent, July 2016		
3	Col. Abdullahi Muse Omar	Incumbent, February 2022		

==== Sierra Leone contingent ====
No.	Commander	Arr. Somalia	Dep. Somalia
1	Col. Mamadi Mohamed Keita	April 2013	4 July 2013, on promotion
2	Brig. Gen. Tamba R. Allieu	July 2013?	January 2015?

- Leobatt 1 (Lt. Col. Abubakar Conteh), 850 strong, deployed April 2013, served in Sector 2 under Kenyan Command, later in Sector Kismayu under their own command. Leobatt 1 eventually left Somalia for home only in January 2015.
- Leobatt 2 (Lt. Col. George Mamoud Bangura) was announced and intended to relieve Leobatt 1 early in 2014. However, due to unexplained delays this second battalion completed first phase training only in January 2014, with planned second and third phase training scheduled to last a further three months each. It was then planned to relieve the first contingent in August 2014 but an Ebola virus outbreak in West Africa caused further concerns. During October 2014 it was announced the second contingent had been in isolation for four months and "cleared" of Ebola virus, but this was quickly followed by an announcement from the Sierra Leone Chief of Defence Staff that the contingent would not travel to Somalia.

Later, during April 2018, a Formed Police Unit of 160 Sierra Leone Police was deployed to AMISOM under the command of Mustafa Solomon Kambeh.

=== Civil staff ===
The civilian staff of AMISOM has been operating from Nairobi, Kenya since 2008 due to the security situation in Mogadishu. As of now, they number approximately 81 personnel.

Since the beginning of 2011 AMISOM and TFG has taken control over several strategic places in Mogadishu after several offensives against Al-Shabaab.

With the expanded control over the capital AMISOM on 16 May 2011 moved the civil staff and police officers to Mogadishu. This includes Special Representative of the Chairperson of the African Union Commission for Somalia (SRCC) Ambassador Boubacar Gaoussou Diarra and deputy (SRCC) Honourable Wafula Wamunyinyi.

Much of the key logistical support for the force was provided by the United Nations Support Office for AMISOM (UNSOA), a field mission of the UN Secretariat Department of Field Support.

The Civilian component was supervised by the Special Representative of the Chairperson of the African Union Commission for Somalia (SRCC) which was represented on the ground by Ambassador Mahamat Saleh Annadif. who oversees the Political, Civil, Humanitarian, Gender and Public Information departments.

Ambassador Epiphanie Kabushemeye-Ntamwana was the civilian Chief of Staff.

The Chief Administrative Officer Timothy Kiguti heads the support component of the mission which includes administration personnel, finance and budgeting, logistics and procurement among other issues.

The Police contingent, which provides capacity building, both institutional and individual in support of the Somali Police Force, was headed by the AMISOM Police Commissioner Anand Pillay.

== Training for contingents ==
The United States has provided extensive training for contingents headed for Somalia. In the first half of 2012, Force Recon Marines from Special Purpose Marine Air-Ground Task Force 12 (SPMAGTF-12) trained soldiers from the Uganda People's Defence Force. In the northern spring of 2012 [March–April–May], Marines from SPMAGTF-12 also trained Burundian soldiers. In April and May, members of Task Force Raptor, 3rd Squadron, 124th Cavalry Regiment of the Texas Army National Guard, took part in a separate training mission with the BNDF in Mudubugu, Burundi. SPMAGTF-12 has also sent its trainers to Djibouti, another nation involved in the Somali mission, to work with an army unit there.

At the same time, U.S. troops have assisted in training the Republic of Sierra Leone Armed Forces in preparation for their deployment to Somalia later this year. In June 2012, U.S. Army Africa commander Major General David R. Hogg spoke encouragingly of the future of Sierra Leone's forces in conjunction with Kenya. As of June 2012, the RSLAF troops have not yet deployed; the Sierra Leonean defence minister said on 23 June 2012, that the battalion might depart for the Horn 'some time in September [2012].'

In addition, a significant amount of support to AMISOM has been provided by private companies. "Bancroft Global Development, headquartered on Washington's Embassy Row, employs about 40 South African and European trainers who work with [AMISOM's] Ugandan and Burundian troops. Bancroft director Michael Stock told The EastAfrican that these mentors are embedded with AMISOM units in Mogadishu and southern and central Somalia. They coach commanders on ..how to predict and defeat the tactics which foreign fighters bring from outside East Africa and teach to al-Shabaab." Bancroft "does not receive funding directly from the US government but was instead paid by AMISOM, which was then reimbursed by the State Department for these outlays." The Associated Press reports that Bancroft has been paid $12.5 million for its work in Somalia since 2008.

A security analyst in Somalia listed three primary private security companies/private military companies operating in Mogadishu. DynCorp, who provide logistical support in the Somali capital; Bancroft International, who provide training to TFG and AMISOM personnel, as well as assisting with community service delivery; and Pacific Architects & Engineers.

== Deployment ==
=== Troop numbers ===
Country	Armed personnel (current)		Casualties	
Country	Troops	Police	Killed	Missing or captured
Uganda People's Defence Force	6,223	201	110-2,700+	
Burundi National Defence Force	5,432		95+	4 missing, 1 captured
(Ethiopia) Ethiopian National Defense Force	4,395		2+ (supposedly)	
Kenya Defence Forces	3,664	48	36–118	
Djibouti Armed Forces	960		8+	
Republic of Sierra Leone Armed Forces	0 (formerly 850)*	47	1	
Nigeria Police Force		200		
Ghana Police Service		56		
Total	20,674	550+	1,108-3,000+	5

* The reason why troops from Sierra Leone were withdrawn was the inability to rotate in fresh soldiers, due to the Ebola outbreak in Sierra Leone and the surrounding region. In response, Ethiopia has offered to replace the contingent from Sierra Leone with Ethiopian reinforcements.
- The total number of personnel under AMISOM (including armed personnel and civil staff) was reportedly around 22,126.
- Before joining AMISOM in January 2014, the Ethiopian Defense Force was believed to have an estimated 8,000 troops in the country. It is also believed that some Ethiopian troops in Somalia operate independently from AMISOM.
- Likewise, Kenya had troops deployed in Somalia independently before they were brought under the AMISOM umbrella
- Cameroon, Mali, Senegal, and Zambia were known to have a total of four personnel inserted into AMISOM. However, it is not known whether they were security or civil personnel.
- There are also a small number of police officers from Burundi, Gambia, and Zimbabwe that are inserted into AMISOM.

== Casualties and major incidents ==
According to SIPRI, 1,039 AMISOM soldiers were killed in action between 1 January 2009, and 31 December 2013, with an additional 69 fatalities in 2014 (per AMISOM) bringing the total to 1,108 dead from 2009 through 2014.

=== March 2007 – February 2011 ===
AMISOM medical facility records showed 110 Ugandan and 95 Burundian soldiers had died between March 2007 and February 2011 in Somalia. Another 798 AMISOM soldiers were wounded. Some of the deadliest incidents were:

- 22 February 2009 – 11 Burundian soldiers were killed and 15 wounded in a double suicide attack on their base in Mogadishu.
- 23–29 July 2009 – An epidemic of leptospirosis hit the Burundian and Ugandan military camps in Mogadishu killing three Burundian and two Ugandan soldiers. Another 18 Burundian soldiers were placed in quarantine. About 50 Burundian and 17 Ugandan soldiers were evacuated for medical treatment to Nairobi, Kenya.
- 17 September 2009 – 17 soldiers were killed and 29 wounded in a suicide attack by Islamist rebels on the headquarters of the African Union force in Mogadishu. At least four civilians were also killed and more than 10 wounded. 12 of those killed were Burundian soldiers and five were Ugandan. Among the dead was the AMISOM deputy commander Maj. Gen. Juvenal Niyonguruza, from Burundi. Also, one of the wounded was AMISOM commander Gen. Nathan Mugisha, from Uganda.
- 23 February – 4 March 2011 – 53 to 82 AU troops were killed in clashes with al-Shabab fighters during an offensive in Mogadishu, 190 other AMISOM troops were also wounded. In addition, a Burundian soldier was captured alive by militants. These were, at the time, the heaviest losses since AMISOM deployed. 43 of those killed were confirmed as Burundian soldiers and 10 as Ugandans. Also, 110 of the wounded were Burundians. Beside the 43 killed in action, four Burundian soldiers were declared missing in action.

=== March–December 2011 ===
- 5 March – A Burundian soldier was injured by the controlled explosion of a car bomb of al-Shabab militants. AMISOM forces won back the rebel-controlled town of Bulo Hawo with the help of forces loyal to the Somali government.
- 17 March – Six AU soldiers were killed in heavy clashes between Somali government troops backed by AMISOM in Mogadishu and al-Shabab militants.
- 12 May – 11 June – 12 AU soldiers were killed (including 7 Ugandans) and 13+ injured during the Bakaara market offensive in Mogadishu.
- 29 July – Four Ugandan soldiers were killed and five wounded during clashes in Mogadishu. An AMISOM tank was also destroyed.
- 1 August – At least two AMISOM soldiers were killed and others wounded in a suicide attack on an AMISOM base in Mogadishu.
- 10 October – One AMISOM soldier was killed and six injured in an operation in North East of Mogadishu. The former Pasta Factory and critical junction, Ex Control Bal'ad, are after that in Government hands.
- 20 October – At least 70 Burundian soldiers were killed and their bodies filmed and paraded by Al-Shabaab following the battle of Deynile, Mogadishu. An unknown number of soldiers were wounded. One AU armoured vehicle was also destroyed in the fighting.
- 23 October – Two AU soldiers were wounded when a suicide bomber blew himself up near a convoy of AU peacekeepers in Mogadishu.
- 29 October – Al-Shabab militants attacked an AMISOM compound injuring two AU soldiers in the Somali capital Mogadishu.
- 25 December – A Burundian soldier was killed by an improvised explosive device, and two others were wounded in Mogadishu.

=== 2012 ===
- 14 January – A Ugandan soldier was killed by a Somali soldier in Mogadishu. The reasons for the act are unknown.
- 20 January – Two AU soldiers were injured in a military offensive to consolidate security in Mogadishu.
- 2 March – Two Ugandan soldiers were injured during the capture of the city of Maslah.
- 29 March – Four Burundian soldiers were wounded in a battle on Daynile District on Mogadishu.
- 31 – 5 August Kenyan soldiers were missing after the capture of Miido. A search and rescue was mounted. Three other soldiers were injured. Three of the soldiers were found alive two days later, but the fate of the other two soldiers remained unknown. A few days later, their bodies were shown in a video posted by the insurgents.
- 19 September – Two AMISOM troops were injured during the capture of Janaa Cabdalla town located 50 kilometres to the west of the port city of Kismayo in the Lower Jubba region.
- 24 October – Four Ugandan soldiers were killed by a bomb while advancing towards Baidoa.
- 29 – 3 October – 4 Ugandan soldiers were killed and seven wounded in an attack by two suicide bombers on an AMISOM base in Mogadishu.
- 19 November – At least two Kenyan soldiers who are part of the African Union (AU) peacekeeping force in Somalia were killed in Garissa, a base for security forces in Kenya fighting insurgents in neighbouring Somalia, Kenya's army spokesman said on Monday.

=== 2014 ===
- 11 March 2014 – At least two AMISOM peacekeepers were injured as AMISOM and Somali troops advanced into areas close to coastal town of Barawe and Qoryoley.
- 18 March 2014 – At least three Dijiboutian soldiers were killed in a hotel attack on the town of Bulo-burde.
- 5 April 2014 – During joint AMISOM-Somali incursion to liberate the town of Wabxo, Al Shabaab fighters claimed to have killed Ethiopian troops from AMISOM and posted photos on social media showing fighters posing over two unidentified bodies in uniform with AMISOM patches, Ethiopian script, helmets, and various weapons.
- 24 May 2014 – Three Ugandan peacekeepers died in an attack by thirteen Al Shabaab militants on the Somali Parliament alongside four Somali soldiers and a police officer. In addition, four Ugandans were wounded but in stable condition. The attack started with a car bomb driven into the parliament building's entrance and ended with eleven of the attackers killed while the other two detonated suicide bombs.
- 26 May 2014 – Two Kenyan soldiers in a supply convoy were killed in an ambush by suspected Al Shabaab militants near the town of Lamu in an area close to the Ras Kamboni region. Kenyan officials confirm that some other Kenyan soldiers were wounded while one militant was killed. They also state that they are in pursuit of the attackers, who fled after the ambush.
- 13 June 2014 – A roadside bomb that was detonated near the town of Bulo Burde injured six AMISOM and Somali soldiers. At least three of the casualties were from the Djibouti contingent and were airlifted to Mogadishu for medical attention after the attack.
- 26 June 2014 – Militants from Al-Shabaab launched an attack on the town of Bulo-Burde, which has been besieged by militants and cut off from road access since it came under government control in March. Witnesses say that the attack lasted thirty minutes and began when militants stormed a military base established in a hotel complex before they were driven back by the combined force of the SNA and AMISOM. Al-Shabaab claimed responsibility and claimed to have killed six soldiers while the AU commander, Ibrahim Ali, stated that two Djiboutian peacekeepers, one civilian, and two militants were killed.
- 16 August 2014 – AMISOM, accompanied by FGS forces, launched Operation Indian Ocean against Al-Shabaab-held pockets in the countryside.
- 25 August 2014 – Ethiopian AMISOM troops assisted by Somali government forces capture Tiyeglow from Al-Shabaab, as part of Operation Indian Ocean. Situated around 530 km northeast of Mogadishu along the main road linking Beledweyne and Baidoa, Tiyeglow previously served as a base for the insurgent group. Witnesses indicate that the Al-Shabaab fighters gave no resistance during the raid, fleeing instead to adjacent forested areas. However, al-Shabaab planted roadside explosive devices before fleeing. According to AMISOM, the successful military operation deprives the insurgent group of high extortion fees that it would previously charge to vehicles traveling along the town's principal road. The siege also now gives the Somali government full control of the Bakool province.
- September 2014 – Human Rights Watch published a report accusing a few soldiers within the Ugandan and Burundian contingents of AMISOM of sexual misconduct on two of the mission's bases in Mogadishu. The African Union issued an official statement denying the allegations, which it characterized as isolated cases largely involving a single rogue soldier. It also pledged to investigate the charges, and indicated that a number of internal mechanisms had been instituted to prevent, mitigate and discipline any transgressions.
- 6 September 2014 – Somali government forces assisted by Ethiopian troops seize El Garas in the Galguduud province from Al-Shabaab. According to the Somali military spokesman Mohamed Kariye Roble, the village was a main base for the insurgent group, serving as both a springboard from which it would launch attacks and a supply storage area.
- 12 September 2014 – Ugandan and Kenyan AMISOM forces conduct security operations in Lagta Berta in Lower Juba, where Al-Shabaab had established two bases after vacating Barawe. The militant group incurs significant fatalities during the raid, including foreign insurgents, and a number of its fighters are also injured. The attack destroys the Al-Shabaab hideout facility.
- 13 September 2014 – Somali government forces and AMISOM troops capture Aboreey, Moqokori, Yasooman, and Muuse-geel villages in the Bulobarte district from Al-Shabaab. The militants mount no resistance. Additionally, Somali government forces and AMISOM troops seize Abooto-barrey, Ceel-Sheel, Carraale and Kaawada villages in the Galguduud province's El Bur district from Al-Shabaab.
- 18 December 2014 – The Sierra Leonian contingent (850 troops) leaves AMISOM and is not replaced. Main reason for their departure is the Ebola outbreak in their home country. During their stay in Somalia the Sierra Leone troops suffered 1 dead and 6 wounded. They were based in Kismayo. In response, Ethiopia has offered to replace the contingent from Sierre Leon with Ethiopian reinforcements.
- 26 December 2014 – Eight Al-Shabaab militants, dressed in Somali uniforms, launched an attack on an AMISOM base near Mogadishu International Airport, which is also home to a United Nations office and several embassies. All militants were killed while five AMISOM peacekeepers and one foreign contractor were killed.

==== Sexual abuse report ====
Human Rights Watch investigation uncovers evidence of sexual exploitation of women. Western-backed African Union troops in Somalia gang-raped women and girls as young as 12 and traded food aid for sex, Human Rights Watch has said. An investigation uncovered evidence of sexual exploitation of women seeking medicine for sick babies at what they assumed was the safety of AU military bases. Human Rights Watch documented cases in a 71-page report published on 8 September 2014 with recommendations to the African Union, the United Nations, the Somali government and AMISOM donors UN, EU, UK and US. The African Union dismissed the Human Rights Watch claims as isolated cases.

=== 2015 ===
- 21 March 2015 – Somali National Army forces and AMISOM troops launch a security sweep in the Bulo Burde district to clear an Al-Shabaab blockade in the area. The cleanup operation commences in Beledweyne, with the joint forces removing militants from settlements on both sides of the main road leading towards the district center. Casualties include around five SNA troops and one AMISOM soldier. Local officials do not issue a statement pending arrival at Bulo Burde.
- 19 April 2015 – Al-Shabaab insurgents attack Kenyan AMISOM troops in the southern Delbio area of Somalia. The insurgents reportedly shoot at the Kenyan soldiers' vehicle, with a gunfight ensuing. AMISOM fatalities include three dead troops. Officials indicate that eight wounded AMISOM soldiers are also being transported to Nairobi for treatment. The militants reportedly retreat into the forest. Al-Shabaab also attack AMISOM troops that are garrisoned between Lego and Baledogle. According to AMISOM Colonel Paul Njuguna, three soldiers are killed in the ensuing skirmish. He adds that the Somali National Army and AMISOM are endeavoring to liberate the remaining areas under insurgent control, with Al-Shabaab in a much weaker state than only two years prior.
- 26 June 2015 – At least 50 Burundian soldiers (with potential excesses of over 70) were reported killed in an attack on their base by Al-Shabab. The attack occurred in Leego near the capital of Mogadishu. It is stated that AMISOM was preparing for an offensive in the region while Al-Shabab was bringing in reinforcements to counter it.
- 1 September 2015 – Between 20–50 AMISOM peacekeepers are killed after the Janale base, 90 km (55 miles) south-east of the capital, is overrun by Al-Shabab militants. After bombing a bridge to eliminate a potential escape route and breaching the gate with a car bomb, Al-Shabab militants were able to enter and take over the base. AMISOM peacekeepers were stated to have withdrawn. After looting the base of weaponry, the militants withdrew and AMISOM troops were seen retaking the area. There have also been reports of troops taken captive during the assault.

=== 2016 ===
- On 15 January a Kenyan company base at El Adde, manned by a detachment of 9 Battalion Kenya Rifles, was overrun by al-Shabaab. Several soldiers were captured, including Private Leonard Maingi who was later murdered by the terrorist group in August 2017. Reports of casualties among the KDF detachment were confused but a later report suggested around 150 Kenyan soldiers died in the attack, with some of their bodies being dragged publicly through the streets of nearby towns by the terrorists.
- On 19 March 2016 two Kenyan soldiers were killed and five others wounded when their convoy was ambushed by terrorists in Lower Juba. During the engagement 21 al-Shabaab fighters were reported killed.
- al-Shabaab lost several of their leaders to U.S. airstrikes during May 2016.
- al-Shabaab fighters attacked an AMISOM base in June 2016.
- During November Lieutenant Dedan Karithi Karuti (26), of 17 Battalion Kenya Rifles, was killed when the vehicle in which he was traveling was struck by an improvised explosive device on the Warei–Elwak road.

=== 2017 ===
- During January al-Shabaab released a video showing the murder of a Ugandan soldier, Private M. Y. Masasa, who had been captured in September 2015 when the AMISOM base at Janaale was overrun by al-Shabaab.
- On 2 January two suicide car bombs targeted a security checkpoint near the airport and a hotel.
- On 4 January three UN soldiers were wounded by an explosion near their headquarters in Mogadishu.
- On 24 January an attack on a hotel in Mogadishu left 28 people dead.
- On 25 January at least 25 people were killed in an al-Shabaab suicide assault on the Somali Parliament building. Two suicide car bombs were used in the assault.
- On 27 January a Kenyan base near Kulbiyow town in the Lower Juba region was attacked by al-Shabaab. According to some reports the base, manned by members of 15 Battalion Kenya Rifles, was overrun and up to 50 Kenyans killed. Kenyan reports say the base was successfully defended and put their death toll at nine.
- On 2 February a civilian was injured when a car bomb exploded near his house.
- On 19 February a car bomb detonated at a Mogadishu market, killing at least 30 people.
- On 27 February a number of Somali National Army (SNA) soldiers were wounded by a car bomb.
- On 28 February a Somali government official was assassinated when an IED fitted under the driver's seat of his car exploded.
- On 2 March it was announced that at least 57 al-Shabaab fighters had been killed in an attack by the Kenyan Defence Force. The KDF spokesman was reported as saying: 'KDF soldiers operating under AMISOM engaged al-Shebaab militants at a location 31 km northwest of Afmadow, close to Subow centre using artillery fire and supported by helicopter gunships.
- On 12 March a Somali journalist survived an assassination attempt after an IED fitted to his car exploded.
- On 13 March a Somali military base in Mogadishu was targeted by a car bomb, killing three and wounding five.
- On 13 March a popular hotel was targeted, leaving six dead.
- On 21 March ten people were killed and 12 others wounded when a car bomb detonated at a security checkpoint.
- On 24 March a car bomb targeted a popular cafe and hotel near the presidential palace.
- On 27 March it was announced that 31 al-Shabaab fighters had been killed during KDF raids on two bases.
- On 5 April 5 eight people were killed outside the Ministry of Youth and Sports headquarters by a car bomb.
- On 9 April a suicide bomber in a vehicle unsuccessfully targeted the new SNA commander, General Mohamed Ahmed Jimale, as his convoy left a military base in Mogadishu. Fifteen SNA soldiers were killed, including several high-ranking officers, and 20 others were wounded in the attack.
- On 10 April 2017 Kenyan sources announced that 15 al-Shabaab fighters had been killed when their camp 4 km west of Catamaa, and approximately 104 km from El Wak, was shelled and then assaulted.
- On 19 April a Djibouti soldier was killed by a member of the SNA following an argument in Bula-burte town, Hiiraan region.
- On 7 May a Somali intelligence official survived an assassination attempt after an IED fitted to his car exploded on Maka al Mukarama Street, Mogadishu.
- On 8 May a cafe on Maka al Mukarama Street, Mogadishu, was targeted by a car bomb, killing five and leaving ten others wounded.
- On 15 May police intercepted and later destroyed a car bomb intended to target the National Theatre.
- On 17 May a car bomb was intercepted but later accidentally detonated killing three and wounding two others.
- On 24 May eight people were killed and 15 others wounded in a car bomb targeting a police checkpoint.
- On 14 June eleven people were killed in an al- Shabaab suicide car bomb attack near a restaurant and hotel in Mogadishu.
- On 20 June six people were killed when a car bomb detonated near a local government administration office in Mogadishu's Wadajir district.
- On 22 June a police station on Maka al Mukarama Street, Mogadishu, was targeted by a car bomb.
- On 19 July a car bomb detonated outside the Ministry of Youth and Sports headquarters wounding one Somali intelligence official.
- On 30 July five soldiers were killed by a car bomb near a security checkpoint on Maka al Mukarama Street.
- On 30 July a joint SNA/Ugandan convoy was ambushed at Goryowein in the Lower Shabelle region, some 140 km southwest of Mogadishu, as they patrolled the Mogadishu–Barawe road, a major supply route for forward bases. Reports of casualties varied but Uganda admitted to losing 12 soldiers with another seven wounded in the attack.
- On 31 July a Somali intelligence official was targeted by an IED attached to his car. The official and two civilians were wounded.
- During August al-Shabaab released a video showing the murder of a Kenyan soldier, Leonard Maingi, who had been captured in January 2016 when the Kenyan base at El Adde was overrun by al-Shebaab.
- On 4 August four people were killed and six others wounded in a car bomb targeting The Ambassador Hotel on Maka al Mukarama Street.
- On 10 August a suicide bomber was stopped at a security checkpoint on Maka al Mukarama Street. The bomber escaped but the bomb later detonated, killing one civilian and wounding three others.
- On 14 August an IED fitted under a taxi killed at least one person near the Jazeera Palace Hotel.
- On 27 August a car bomb detonated injuring two people on Maka al Mukarama Street.
- On 11 September a car bomb killed one person and injured four others near a cafe and hotel on Maka al Mukarama Street.
- On 20 September a Somali intelligence official was assassinated when a bomb on his car exploded in Mogadishu.
- On 24 September Somali General Abdullahi Mohamed Sheikh Qururuh and his bodyguard were assassinated by gunmen in Mogadishu.
- On 28 September a car bomb outside a restaurant killed seven people.
- On 29 September Somali sources reported 30 people — 12 soldiers and 18 insurgents — killed in an al-Shebaab attack on an SNA base in Barire, 47 km southwest of Mogadishu. al-Shebaab sources reported 30 government soldiers killed and 11 vehicles captured by them.
- On 14 October a large vehicle-borne explosive device detonated at a busy crossroads in Mogadishu, killing at least 300 people. While al-Shebaab did not claim responsibility for this attack it was widely believed to have been the work of this terrorist group.
- On 25 October a Ugandan soldier and two civilians were reported killed by al-Shebaab insurgents in an ambush on the outskirts of Mogadishu which also left four terrorists dead.
- On 28 October five al-Shabaab terrorists detonated a car bomb outside a Mogadishu hotel before assaulting the building and killing civilians. Up to 23 people were killed, along with two of the terrorists, before Somali security forces were able to end the attack. Three surviving terrorists were captured. A second suicide car bomb detonated near the former Parliament house.

=== 2018 ===
- On 23 February twin car-bomb explosions in Mogadishu killed at least 38 people. The first targeted the presidential palace, Villa Somalia, while the second bomb apparently targeted a hotel.
- On 23 February Ugandan soldiers shot dead three Somalia National Army (SNA) personnel in Mogadishu after a Ugandan vehicle convoy was apparently fired upon by the Somalis.
- On 1 March two soldiers were killed and five other people wounded in an al-Shebaab suicide car-bomb attack on a checkpoint 15 km outside Mogadishu.
- On 2 March five Burundian soldiers were reported killed in an al-Shebaab ambush on a military convoy near Balad, 30 km north of Mogadishu. On the same day a suicide bomb attack on a SNA base at Afgoye and subsequent IED attack resulted in five SNA personnel and a suicide bomber dying.
- On 2 April al-Shebaab launched coordinated attacks on three Ugandan bases, at Qoryoley, Buulo Mareer and Golweyn. Initial reports gave casualties as 36 al-Shebaab killed with four Ugandan soldiers killed and six wounded. Subsequent reports from Uganda gave conflicting accounts of their casualties but it seems likely six Ugandans died.
- On 11 April U.S. forces destroyed a Shebaab vehicle-borne improvised explosive device (VBIED) in the vicinity of Jana Cabdalle, some 50 km northwest of Kismayo. This was reported to be the twelfth air strike by American forces in Somalia during 2018.
- On 12 April al-Shebab detonated a bomb at a soccer stadium in Baraawe, killing at least five people.
- In the early hours of 24 April a Burundian base in the Arba'ow area, near Elasha Biyahawas on the outskirts of Mogadishu, was reported attacked by insurgents.
- On 25 April a UPDF convoy in the El-Waregow area, outside the port city of Merka, was reported to have been targeted by a road-side IED which was followed by an insurgent attack.
- On 9 May a roadside bomb in the town of Wanlaweyn, some 90 km northwest of Mogadishu, killed at least five people when it exploded. Other reports attribute the explosion to a suicide bomber targeting a khat market, and say that eleven civilians were killed, or ten killed and fifteen wounded.
- On 10 May a second explosion in Wanlaweyn killed seven Somali soldiers and wounded a further two when a road-side bomb targeted the vehicle in which they were travelling. The casualty list was also reported as ten soldiers killed.
- On 12 May fighting in the village of Halfoley, near the town of Jalalaqsi in the Hiran region, between Somali soldiers and villagers against al-Shebaab tax collectors left 13 insurgents dead.
- Also on 12 May a bomb in a market in the Bulomarer district killed four civilians and wounded five.
- On 31 May a U.S. air strike 50 km southwest of Mogadishu was reported to have killed 12 al-Shebaab insurgents. This was said to be the fifteenth U.S. air strike in Somalia during 2018.
- On 2 June U.S. forces conducted their sixteenth air strike in Somalia for 2018. Twenty-seven 'terrorists' were reported killed in the strike near the town of Bosaso, in Puntland. Although the true success of this and other U.S. air/drone strikes in Somalia must remain in doubt as there seems to have been no ground follow-up and so no enemy bodies were recovered, or enemy personnel individually identified; no prisoners taken; no documents captured; no weapons or equipment recovered.
- On 8 June fighting was reported between Somalia National Army forces and al-Shebaab when the insurgents attacked the town of El Wak in what was believed to be a continuation of intensified attacks over Ramadan.
- On 8 June a Somali soldier was assassinated in a market in Afgoye.
- During 8 and 9 June al-Shebaab attacks on a joint Somali-Kenyan-U.S. base 2 km north of the town of Sanguni led to the deaths of a U.S. Special Forces soldier and two Somali soldiers, with another four U.S. personnel wounded. The base was reported to have then been abandoned.
- On 11 June at least five Somali soldiers were killed and three others injured in an insurgent attack near Teed, 30 km north of Huddur in the Bakool region.
- On 1 July a mortar bombardment apparently aimed at an AMISOM base in the suburb of Halane, Mogadihsu, killed five people and injured another ten.
- On 7 July two suicide bombings followed by an attempt to storm Somalia's Ministry of Interior in Mogadishu left at least 10 people dead and another 20 wounded.
- On 13/14 July al-Shebaab attacked the Police Commissioner's residence in Baidoa, killing three soldiers and injuring four.
- On 14 July two car-bombs were detonated in Mogadishu targeting the presidential palace compound.
- On 23 July Somali forces reportedly repulsed an insurgent attack on one of their bases near Bar-Sanguuni, Lower Juba region, killing 87 insurgents while losing six of their own men. Al-Shebaab claimed – with some supporting photographic evidence – to have overrun the base and killed 27 government troops.
- On 27 August U.S Forces reportedly killed three terrorists in an air strike 40 km southwest of Mogadishu. This was apparently the 21st air strike by U.S forces to be carried out against al-Shebaab during 2018.
- On 11 September al-Shabaab attacked government forces in Mubaraak village, some 60 km west of Mogadishu, killing one of the government troops.
- On 21 September al-Shebaab attacked government forces in a position 50 km southwest of Mogadishu. In response U.S. forces launched air strikes that reportedly killed 18 insurgents. A further two insurgents were said to have been killed by the defending government troops.
- On 1 October U.S forces reportedly killed nine insurgents and wounded one other in an air strike some 40 km northeast of Kismayo. The air strike was said to be in response to an insurgent attack on government forces.
- On 1 October a suicide bomber drove a car into an EU (Italian) military convoy outside the Jaalle Siyad military base in the Hodan district of Mogadishu, killing two civilians and injuring another four.
- On 13 October two suicide bombers detonated explosive devices in the town of Baidoa, killing 15 civilians.
- On 14 October a third al-Shebaab attack on Somali government forces in just over a month occurred near Araara, triggering a U.S air strike in response. The air strike was reported to have killed four terrorists.

=== 2020 ===
29 May 2020 The Security Council reauthorized the AU Mission in Somalia (AMISOM) until 28 February 2021.

=== 2021 ===
- On 11 December 2021, al-Shebaab claimed responsibility for an IED attack on AU peacekeepers in which four Burundian soldiers died in the vicinity of Buurane and Mahaday towns in the Middle Shabelle region.

== 2022 ==
The 14 year long AMISOM mission came to an end in March 2022 and it was replaced by a Somali led operation, the African Union Transition Mission in Somalia (ATMIS).

== Gallery ==
An AMISOM Formed Police Unit gets a briefing at their headquarters before deployment for the Joint Somali Police Force (SPF) and Africa Union Mission in Somalia (AMISOM) patrol in Mogadishu, Somalia on 11 April 2021.

Ugandan soldiers serving under the African Union Mission in Somalia (AMISOM), take part in a communal cleaning up exercise as part of the events to mark Tarehe Sita in Mogadishu, Somalia, on 6 February 2022.

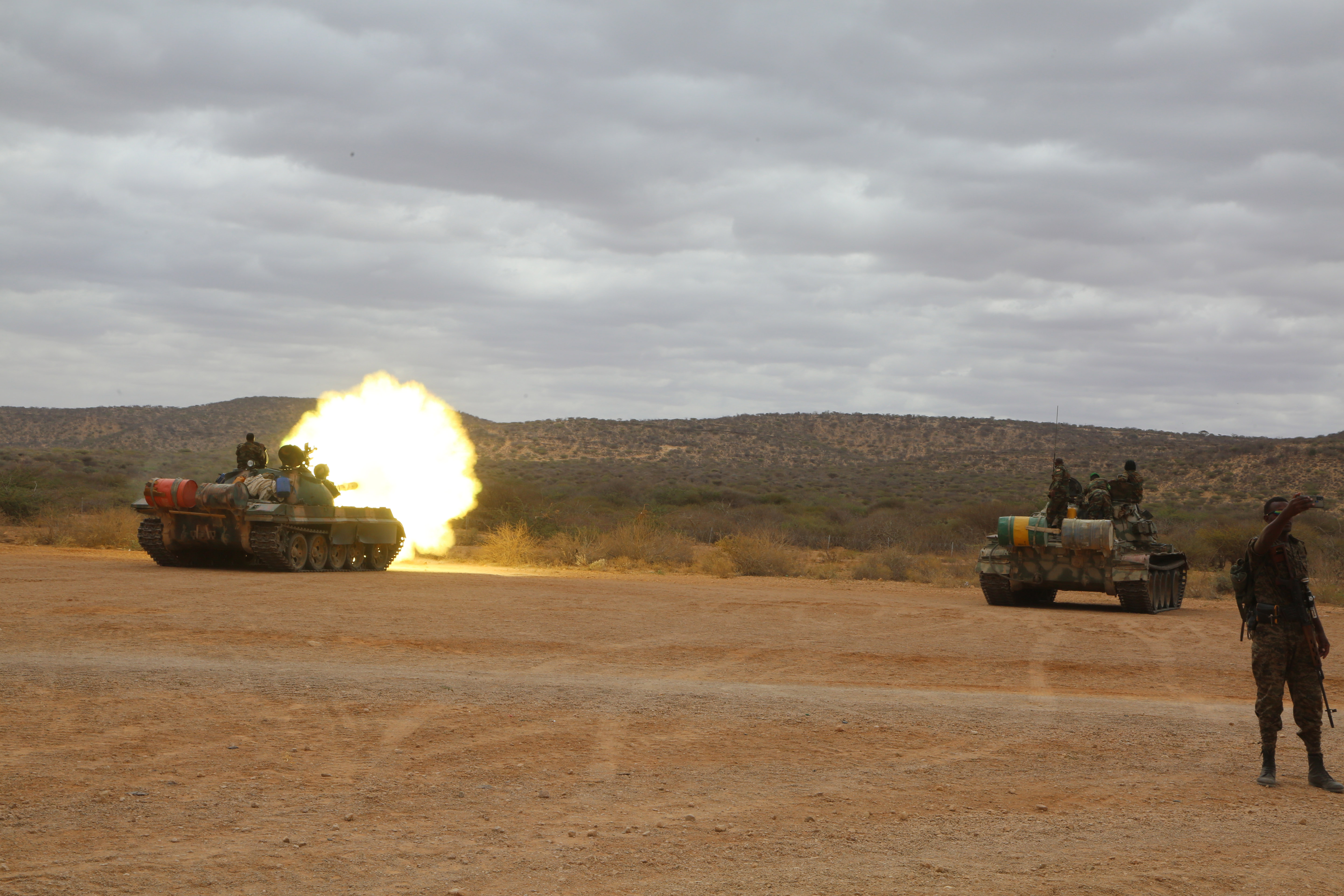
Ethiopian military serving under the African Union Mission in Somalia (AMISOM) in sector 4 based at Beletweyne carry out live-fire drills during a combat readiness training and drill aimed at enhancing their quick deployment. The four-week training was concluded on July 30, 2021, in sector 4 headquarters in Beletweyne, Hiiran region of Hirshabelle State of Somalia.

The Police Commissioner of the African Union Mission in Somalia (AMISOM), Assistant Inspector General of Police (AIGP), Augustine Magnus Kailie, inspects a guard of honour mounted by AMISOM Ethiopian troops in Garbaharey, Somalia, on 18 October 2021.

Force Commander of the African Union Mission in Somalia (AMISOM), Lt. Gen. Diomede Ndegeya, and AMISOM Police Commissioner disembark from a United Nations aircraft upon arrival at Dhusamareb, Somalia on 10 September 2021.

== See also ==
- United Nations Security Council
- African Union
- United Nations-African Union Mission in Darfur
- African Union-led Regional Task Force
- Multinational Joint Task Force
- Force Intervention Brigade
- Intergovernmental Authority on Development
- Islamic Courts Union
- Transitional Federal Government
- Somali Civil War (diplomatic and humanitarian efforts)
