= Silas Ntigurirwa =

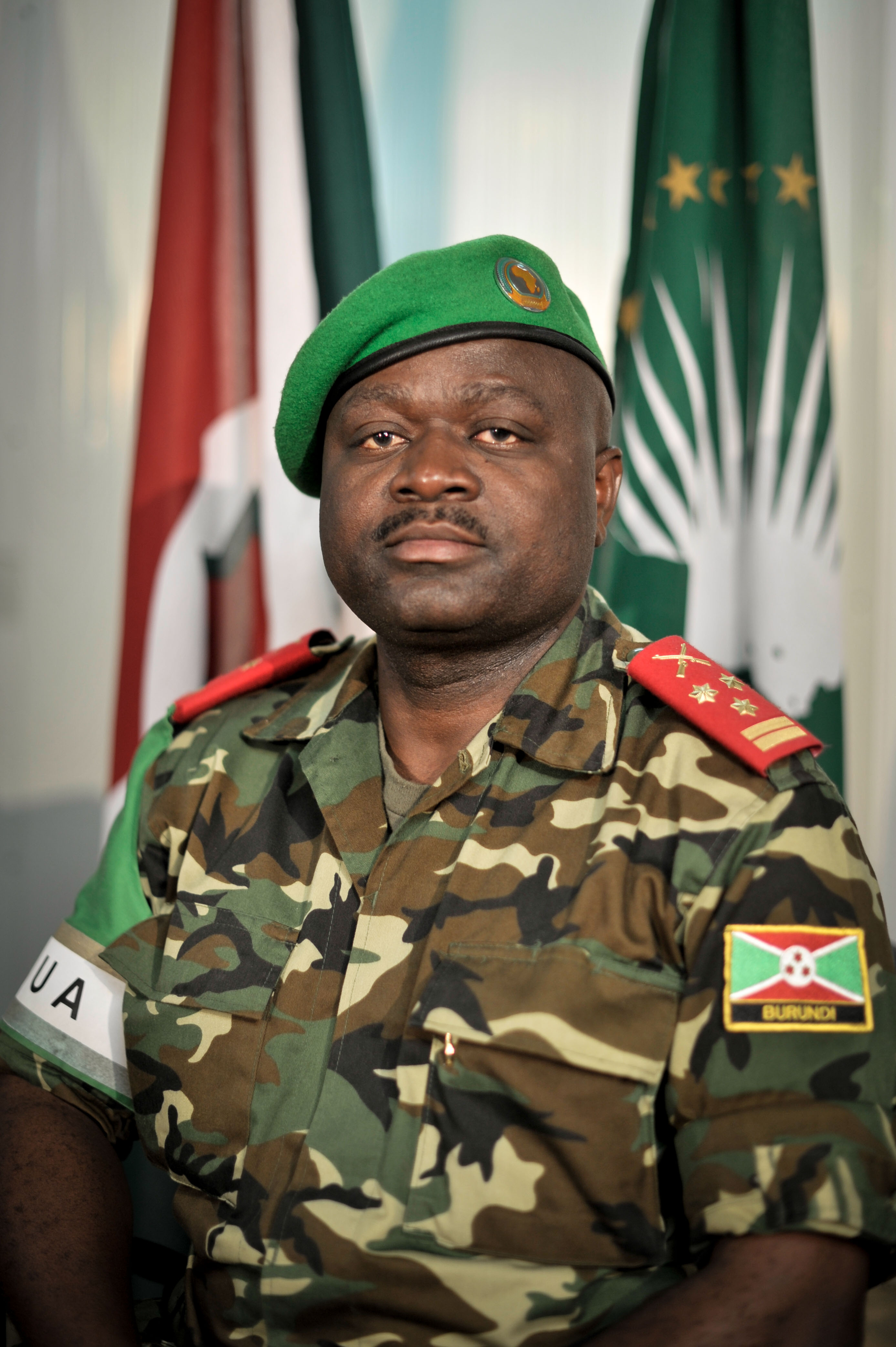
Gen. Silas Ntigurirwa

Lieutenant General Silas Ntigurirwa (born 12 December 1968 in Cibitoke Province, Burundi) is a Burundian military officer, in the Burundi National Defense Forces (BNDF). Effective December 2013, he is the Commander of AMISOM, based in Mogadishu, Somalia. Lieutenant General Silas Ntigurirwa is the first Burundian and first non-Ugandan to command AMISOM, since the creation of the Mission in 2007. He served as AMISOM commander until December 2014 and was succeeded by Lieutenant General Jonathan Kipkemoi Rono.

== Succession table as Commandant of AMISOM ==
Military offices
Preceded by Lieutenant General Andrew Gutti	Commander of AMISOM; 18 December 2013 – present	Succeeded by Lieutenant General Jonathan Kipkemoi Rono
