= Nathan Mugisha =

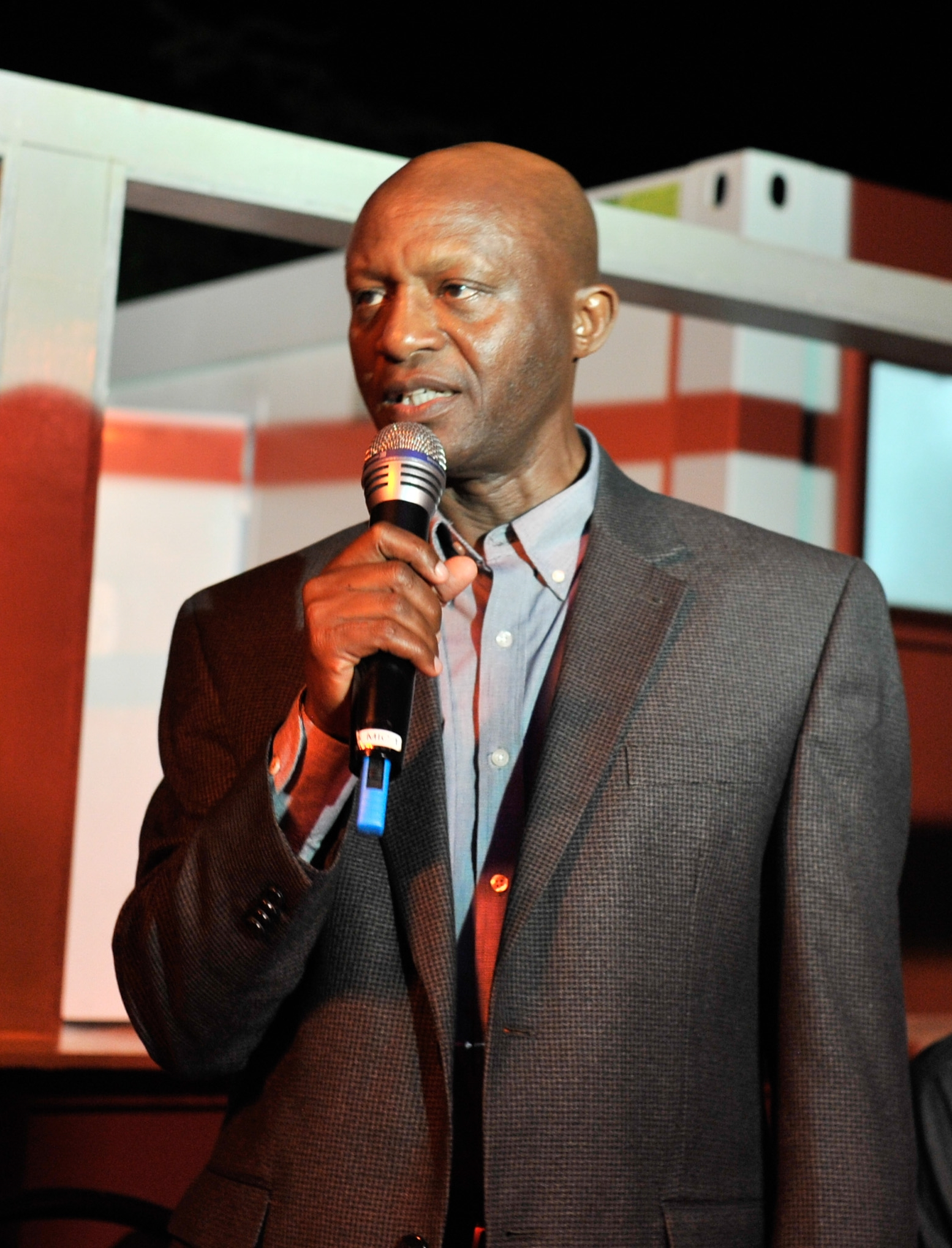
- Nathan Mugisha in 2015
- Born: Western Region, Uganda
- Military career
- Allegiance: Uganda
- Branch: Uganda People's Defence Force
- Rank: Major General
- Commands: Commander of AMISOM; Commandant of Uganda Senior Command and Staff College; Commanding Officer of 4th Division UPDF
- Conflicts: Battle of Mogadishu (2010–2011)

Major General Nathan Mugisha is a military officer in the Uganda People's Defence Force. He is the current deputy ambassador of Uganda to Somalia. He was appointed to that position in June 2011. Prior to that, he served as the commander of the African Union Mission to Somalia from June 2009 to June 2011, being the third military officer to serve in that capacity. Previously, he was commandant of the Uganda Senior Command and Staff College in Kimaka, a suburb of Jinja.

== Background ==
Mugisha was born in Western Uganda. He attended Ugandan schools prior to joining the Ugandan military.

== Career ==
In June 2005, at the rank of colonel, Mugisha was the commanding officer of the 4th Division of the Uganda People's Defence Force, based in the Northern Ugandan city of Gulu.

He later was appointed commandant of the Uganda Senior Command and Staff College.

Mugisha replaced Major General Francis Okello as commander of the African Union Mission to Somalia (AMISOM) on 7 July 2009. Under Mugisha's command, AMISOM repelled the "Ramadan Offensive" launched by al-Shabaab during August 2010. In February and March 2011, AMISOM made significant progress in Mogadishu during the anti-insurgence offensive, and controlled approximately 50% of the city after that offensive.

== Succession table as commander of AMISOM ==
Military offices
Preceded by Major General Francis Okello	Commander of AMISOM; 7 July 2009 - 15 June 2011	Succeeded by Major General Fredrick Mugisha

== See also ==
- Military of Uganda
