= Elly Kayanja =

Ugandan general

Major General Elly Kayanja
- Born: 1959 (age 66–67); Rakai District, Uganda
- Citizenship: Uganda
- Education: Uganda Senior Command and Staff College (Senior Command and Staff Course)
- Occupation: Military Officer
- Years active: 1982 – 2022
- Known for: Military Matters

Major General Elly Kayanja (born 1959), is a Ugandan military officer in the Uganda People's Defence Forces (UPDF). Effective September 2014, he is the Head of Operation Wealth Creation Programme, whose objective is to improve the standard of living of rural citizens, through farming. Previously, he served as the Deputy Director of National Intelligence, under General David Sejusa. Prior to that, he served as the Director General of the Internal Security Organisation.

== Background ==
He was born in Rakai District, in Uganda's Central Uganda, circa 1959.

== Military education ==
Elly Kayanja was a member of the first class of senior military officers to attend the Uganda Senior Command and Staff College in Kimaka, Jinja, Eastern Uganda, under its first Commandant General Ivan Koreta in 2004. That pioneer class included some of Uganda's current and past leading military commanders including: (a) General Salim Saleh (b) General Elly Tumwine (c) General David Sejusa (d) Brigadier Nobel Mayombo (RIP) (e) Major General Julius Oketta (RIP) and (f) Brigadier Peter Kerim (RIP).

== Work history ==
Elly Kayanja joined the NRA War in 1980 as a foot soldier. He has gradually risen through the ranks and, at one time, served as the Commander of the Tiger Battalion of the UPDF, based at Mubende. He then served as the Deputy Director of the Internal Security Organisation (ISO), under the leadership of Lieutenant General Henry Tumukunde. Kayanja replaced Tumukunde as Director of ISO in 2001. While at ISO, he is credited with the successful supervision of Operation Wembly, a UPDF response to rampant crime and armed gang activity in Kampala and other Ugandan urban areas, in the early 2000s.

Later, he served as the Deputy Coordinator of National Intelligence, under General David Sejusa. In September 2014, he was appointed as the Head of Operation Wealth Creation in the UPDF, an operation aimed at improving the lives and economic status of the rural poor through agriculture. In that role, he will become the Head of the National Agricultural Advisory Services (NAADS), a national program that has hitherto performed abysmally, despite adequate funding, prompting take-over by the Army.

In February 2019, over 2,000 UPDF men and women were promoted on one day. On that day Elly Kayanja was promoted from the rank of Brigadier to that of Major General.

Military offices
Preceded by Henry Tumukunde; As Director Internal Security Organisation	Director Internal Security Organisation; 2001 - 2004	Succeeded by Amos Makumbi; As Director Internal Security Organisation
