= Patrick Kankiriho =

Ugandan military officer (1961–2013)

- Born: October 28, 1961; Kiruhura District, Uganda
- Died: April 8, 2013 (aged 51); Nakasero Hospital, Kampala
- Citizenship: Uganda
- Education: Uganda Senior Command and Staff College (Senior Military Command Course)
- Occupation: Military officer
- Years active: 1982–2013
- Known for: Military matters
- Spouse: Deborah Kankiriho

Brigadier Patrick Kankiriho (October 28, 1961 – April 8, 2013) was a military officer in Uganda. He was a senior commander in the Uganda People's Defence Force (UPDF). At the time of his death, he was the commander of the 2nd Army Division in Mbarara, Western Uganda. In 2008, he served as the commander of Operation Lightning Thunder, the military operation that dislodged the Lord’s Resistance Army rebels out of Garamba National Forest, in the Democratic Republic of the Congo.

== Background and education ==
He was born in Kiruhura District in 1961. Patrick Kankiriho attended Mbarara High School in the 1970s. In 1977, he left school to join the Uganda National Liberation Front guerillas who overthrew Idi Amin in 1979, with the assistance of the Tanzania People's Defence Force (TPDF). In 2005, at the rank of lieutenant colonel, he attended the Uganda Senior Command and Staff College, at Kimaka, Jinja, Eastern Uganda, graduating in 2006.

== Military career ==
In 1982, Kankiriho joined the guerrilla National Resistance Army (NRA), led by Yoweri Museveni. After the NRA captured power in 1986, he was among the junior army officers who were deployed in Northern Uganda to fight the Holy Spirit Movement, led by Alice Lakwena. In the 1990s, at the rank of captain, he fought against the Allied Democratic Forces (ADF) rebels in Western Uganda.

At the rank of major, Patrick Kankiriho served as the commander of the UPDF 13th Battalion in Northern Uganda. In 2003, he was promoted to the rank of lieutenant colonel and was appointed commandant of the UPDF 401 Infantry Brigade, based in Lira. After completing a one-year senior command course at the Uganda Senior Command and Staff College at Kimaka, he was promoted to the rank of colonel and was appointed commander of the UPDF 3rd Division based in Moroto. While there, he was heavily involved in the disarmament of the Karamojong people. In 2007, he was promoted to the rank of brigadier and in 2008 was deployed to Garamba in Democratic Republic of Congo where he commanded Operation Lightning Thunder, which dislodged Joseph Kony's Lord's Resistance Army out of Uganda and DRC. He was later assigned to the UPDF 2nd Division as the commanding officer.

== Personal ==
Patrick Kankiriho is survived by his widow, Deborah Kankiriho, and four children, including Arinda Daisy Kankiriho.

== See also ==
- Uganda Senior Command and Staff College
