= Charles Oluka =

Ugandan military officer (died 2025)

Brigadier General Charles Oluka
- Born: Soroti District, Uganda
- Died: 29 January 2025; Kampala, Uganda
- Citizenship: Uganda
- Occupation: Military officer
- Known for: Military matters
- Title: Director General; Internal Security Organisation
- Spouse: Rose Amongin Oluka (m. 1981)

Charles Oluka (1956 – 29 January 2025) was a Ugandan military officer at the rank of Brigadier general in the Uganda People's Defence Force (UPDF). He was the Director General of the Internal Security Organisation, from 8 October 2020 until his death on 29 January 2025. Before that, he served as the Director of technical services at the spy agency until 2018.

== Early life ==
Oluka was born in 1956 in Kumi district in Eastern Uganda.

Oluka went to Tanzania Military Academy in Monduli in 1990 where he got military training. He also went to Galileo College based in Israel for military trainings in officer Cadet, Junior Staff and Command Course, Company Commanders’ Course and Strategic National Security. He also attained basic military training at Kaweweta.

== Military career ==
Oluka joined UPDF in 1987 and was commissioned in 1991.

Oluka served as Director of Technical Services at ISO, a position he held up to 2018.

On 8 October 2020, President Yoweri Museveni appointed him as the substantive Director general of the Internal Security Organisation. He replaced Colonel Kaka Bagyenda, who, together with his deputy Don Mugimba, were relieved of their positions.

ISO under Brig Gen Oluka was also pivotal in the apprehension of criminals involved in the greater Masaka machete attacks that left close to 30 people killed between July and September 2021. He was always present in joint security briefings whenever a crime incident that needed joint efforts happened.

In January 2024, Oluka was promoted to a rank of brigadier general in the UPDF by Yoweri Museveni from a rank of colonel.

Oluka's deputy is Taban Amin, one the sons of former Ugandan president Idi Amin.

== Death ==
Oluka died on arrival at Seguku hospital, Kampala on 29 January 2025 after collapsing during a family prayer session. He was buried on 8 February 2025 in Ousia village found in Apapai sub-county in Kalaki district with eleven gun salute as an honor for his service in military.

== Family life ==
Oluka was married to Harriet Akisa and they had their wedding in 2023 at St Patrick's Catholic Church in Madera found in Soroti.

== See also ==
- Elly Kayanja
- Jim Muhwezi
- Henry Tumukunde
- Internal Security organization

== Order of succession ==
Military offices
Preceded by Kaka Bagyenda; As Director General Internal Security Organisation	Director General Internal Security Organisation; 2020–2025	Succeeded by Incumbent; As Director General Internal Security Organisation
