= Benon Biraaro =

Ugandan military officer (1958–2020)

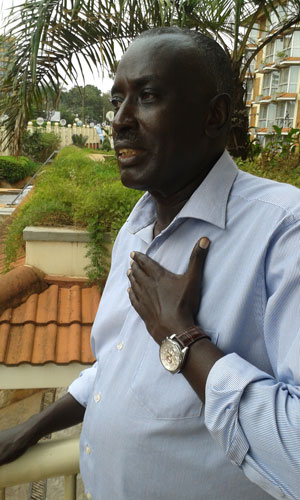
- Born: 1 March 1958; Isingiro District, Uganda Protectorate
- Died: 12 February 2020 (aged 61); Kampala, Uganda
- Citizenship: Uganda
- Education: Makerere University (Bachelor of Arts in political science); Cranfield University (Master of Arts in global strategic studies)
- Occupation: Military Officer
- Years active: 1982 — 2020
- Known for: Presidential candidate for the 2016 Ugandan general election
- Political party: Farmers Party of Uganda

Benon Biraaro (1 March 1958 – 12 February 2020; surname sometimes spelled Biraro) was a Ugandan military officer and a high-ranking commander in the Uganda People's Defence Force (UPDF). While still in the active military, he served as the commandant of the Uganda Senior Command and Staff College in Kimaka, Jinja. In 2016, he ran (unsuccessfully) for President of Uganda on behalf of his agrarian Farmers Party of Uganda.

== Background and formal education ==
Benon Biraaro was born on 1 March 1958 in Isingiro District. He attended Makerere University, in Kampala, Uganda's oldest and largest public university, graduating in 1982 with a Bachelor of Arts in political science. Later, he attended Cranfield University in the United Kingdom, graduating with a Masters in Global Strategic Studies.

== Military education ==
His military education included the following courses:

- Officer Cadet Course
- Junior Staff College in the United Kingdom
- Junior Command and Staff College at the Nigerian Defence Academy, in Kaduna, Nigeria
- Senior Command and Staff College at Fort Leavenworth, Kansas, USA
- Africa Strategic Studies Course at Nasser Military Academy, Cairo, Egypt
- Masters in Global Security Studies at Cranfield University, United Kingdom

== Military career ==
Benon Biraaro joined the Ugandan Bush War on 7 June 1982, straight out of Makerere University. By 1984, he had risen to the position of secretary to the High Command and National Resistance Council. By 1986, he was the deputy to Yoweri Museveni’s Principal Private Secretary. He was then posted to Kitgum District, as the special district administrator from 1986 until 1987. He then was transferred to Kyankwanzi and served as deputy commandant of the National Leadership Institute. Next, he served as the commanding officer of the 97th Battalion in Uganda's Eastern Region, which ended the insurgency in the Teso sub-region and in Tororo and Busia districts. Following that, he served as the commander of the military police in Uganda. He was then appointed the military representative in the Office of the Inspector General of Government. He then served as a member of the Adhoc Committee on Human Rights under the chairmanship of Abu Mayanja. He then became the director of training in the UPDF.

In 1998, he commanded the Ugandan contingent to the Democratic Republic of the Congo (DRC). He then became the commander of the Infantry Division in the Western Region of Uganda. He was appointed deputy chief of staff of the UPDF (DCOS), the fifth-highest rank in the Uganda military. Next, he served as the commandant for two in-takes at the Uganda Senior Command and Staff College at Kimaka in the Eastern Region. He then served as the chief of the Strategic Planning and Management Unit of the Peace and Security Council at the African Union headquarters in Addis Ababa, Ethiopia.

== Other responsibilities ==
Biraaro and several prominent individuals in the Ugandan military and business started a public-private partnership with the aim of raising investment funds locally to invest in local infrastructure and industry. Biraaro was the founder president and lead investor in Local Investment for Transformation.

== Personal details ==
General Biraaro was a married father. He was of the Christian faith. He was reported to have built a church in the village where he was born, in Isingiro District.

== Death ==
He died on the morning of 12 February 2020, at Kampala Hospital, where he had been admitted six days earlier. He was reported to have died from colon cancer. He died age 61.

== See also ==
- Ivan Koreta
- Aronda Nyakairima
- Isingiro District

Military offices
Unknown	Commandant Uganda Senior Command and Staff College	Unknown
