= Ronnie Balya =

Ugandan general

Brigadier General Ronnie Balya
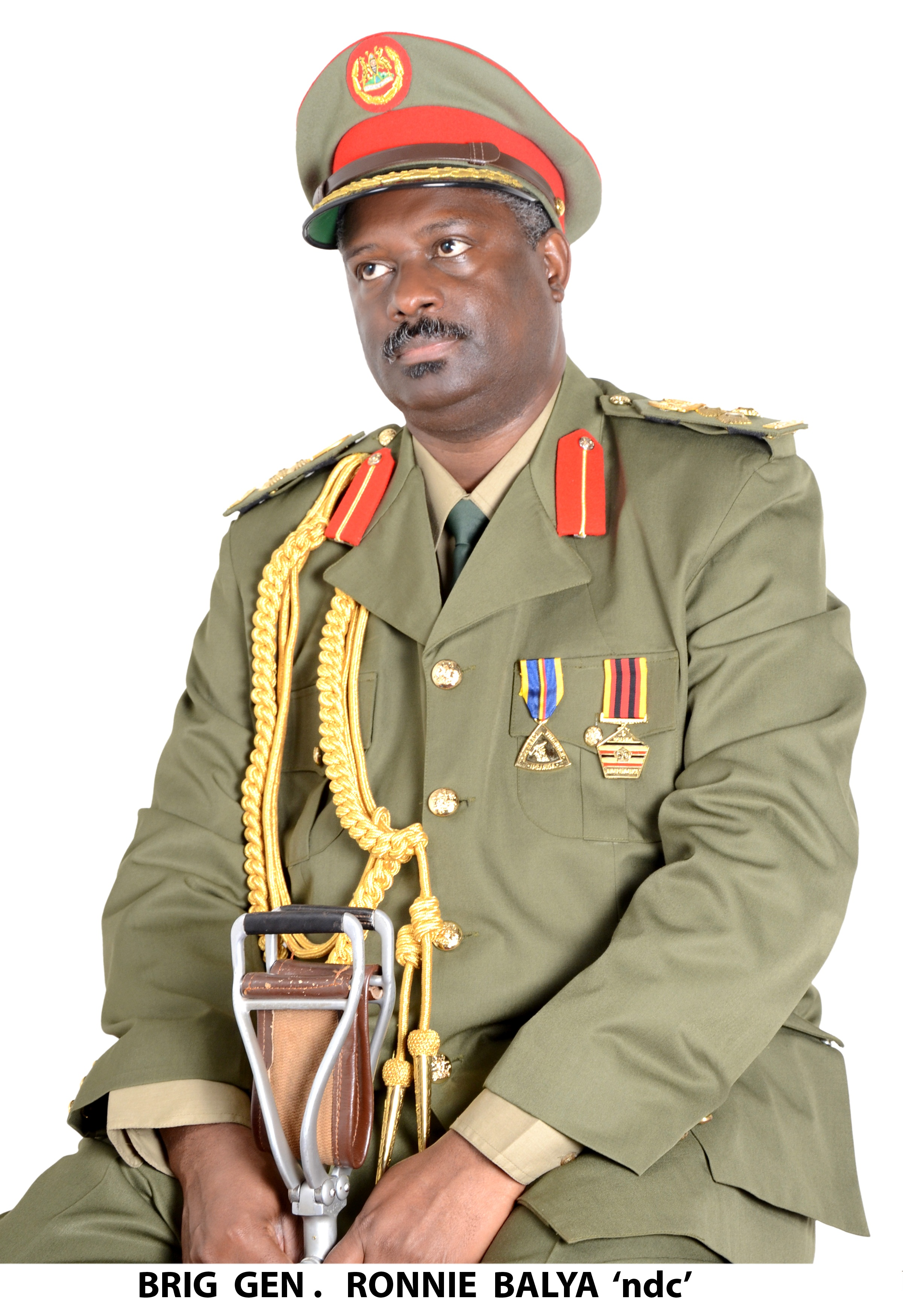
- Born: 1961 (age 64–65); Fort Portal, Uganda
- Citizenship: Uganda
- Education: Makerere University (Bachelor of Social Sciences); University of Nairobi (Master of Arts in Diplomacy and International Studies; National Defence College, Kenya (Strategic Command and Leadership Course)
- Occupations: Military officer and Diplomat
- Years active: 1985 – present
- Known for: Military matters
- Title: Current ambassador of Uganda to South Sudan

Ronnie Balya (born 1961) is a Ugandan military officer currently serving at the rank of brigadier general in the Uganda People's Defence Force (UPDF). He is currently serving as Uganda's ambassador to South Sudan, based in Juba, from 2017. Before that, from 2010 until 2017, he was the director general of the Internal Security Organisation (ISO).

== Background and education ==
Balya was born 1961 in Kabarole District in Toro sub-region, in the Western Region of Uganda. He studied at Makerere University, graduating with a Bachelor of Social Sciences degree. He continued with his studies at University of Nairobi where he earned a Master of Arts degree in Diplomacy and International Studies. He was selected by the commander in chief to attend a Strategic Command and Leadership Course at the National Defence College, Kenya, in Nairobi. He has also studied in various intelligence courses in Russia, the United Kingdom and the United States.

== Military career ==
He joined the National Resistance Army in 1985. He served initially as a district internal security officer in Northern Uganda and Western Uganda. In 1997, Balya was moved to headquarters where he served in various capacities like director of the ISO inspectorate, director analysis and director technical intelligence. In August 2006, Balya was appointed deputy director general of ISO.

On 27 July 2010, Balya was appointed director general of ISO, replacing Amos Mukumbi who was given another engagement in government. In December 2010, he was promoted to the rank of colonel. In February 2014, he was promoted to the rank of Brigadier.

== Other responsibilities ==
He is the current Uganda's Ambassador Extraordinary and Plenipotentiary to the Republic of South Sudan-Recently he addressed Uganda, South Sudan business forum held in Juba in July 2022 where he emphasized Uganda's commitment to promoting trade, peace, security and stability in the region (Full speech of Amb. H.E Brig.Gen. Ronnie Balya ‘ndc’, during the July Uganda, South Sudan Business forum, https://explorer.co.ug/inside-uganda-south-sudan-trade-ties/ . In addition to his duties at ISO, he served as the chair of the Joint Intelligence Committee which brings together all the Intelligence agencies. He was also the secretary to the National Security Council, which is chaired by the president and composed of Ministers and Security Chiefs that handle National Defence and Security matters. In July 2016, he told the Ugandan Cabinet during a retreat in Kyankwanzi District that "corruption is killing government".

== See also ==
- Elly Kayanja
- Jim Muhwezi
- Henry Tumukunde

== Order of succession ==
Military offices
Preceded by Amos Makumbi; As Director General Internal Security Organisation	Director General Internal Security Organisation; 2010 - 2017	Succeeded by Kaka Bagyenda; As Director General Internal Security Organisation
