= Peter Kerim =

Ugandan military officer (1955–2012)

- Born: 1 January 1955; Nebbi District, Uganda
- Died: 5 February 2012 (aged 57); Nakasero Hospital, Kampala
- Citizenship: Uganda
- Education: Uganda Senior Command and Staff College; Kimaka, Jinja, Uganda
- Occupation: Military Officer
- Years active: 1973–2012
- Known for: Military Matters

Brigadier Peter Kerim (1955–2012) was a military officer in Uganda. He was a senior commander in the Uganda People's Defence Force (UPDF). At the time of his death, he was the Deputy Commander of the National Reserve Force within the UPDF. Prior to that, he served as the Deputy Director of the External Security Organisation. In the past, his former assignments included as the Commandant of the 4th Army Division in Gulu, Northern Uganda. In the 1990s he was one of the commanders in the Ituri conflict in the Democratic Republic Of The Congo.

== Background ==
He was born in Nebbi District in 1955.

== Military education ==
In 2004, at the rank of colonel, he was a member of the pioneer class to attend the Uganda Senior Command and Staff College, at Kimaka, Jinja, Eastern Uganda, under its first commandant, Lieutenant General Ivan Koreta.

== Military career ==
He joined the then Uganda Army in 1973 as a private and rose through the ranks to brigadier, at the time of his death.

== Personal ==
Peter Kerim was survived by his widow; Caroline Nyendwoha Kerim and four children.

== See also ==
- Uganda Senior Command and Staff College
