= Salim Saleh =

Ugandan military officer (born 1960)

General Salim Saleh
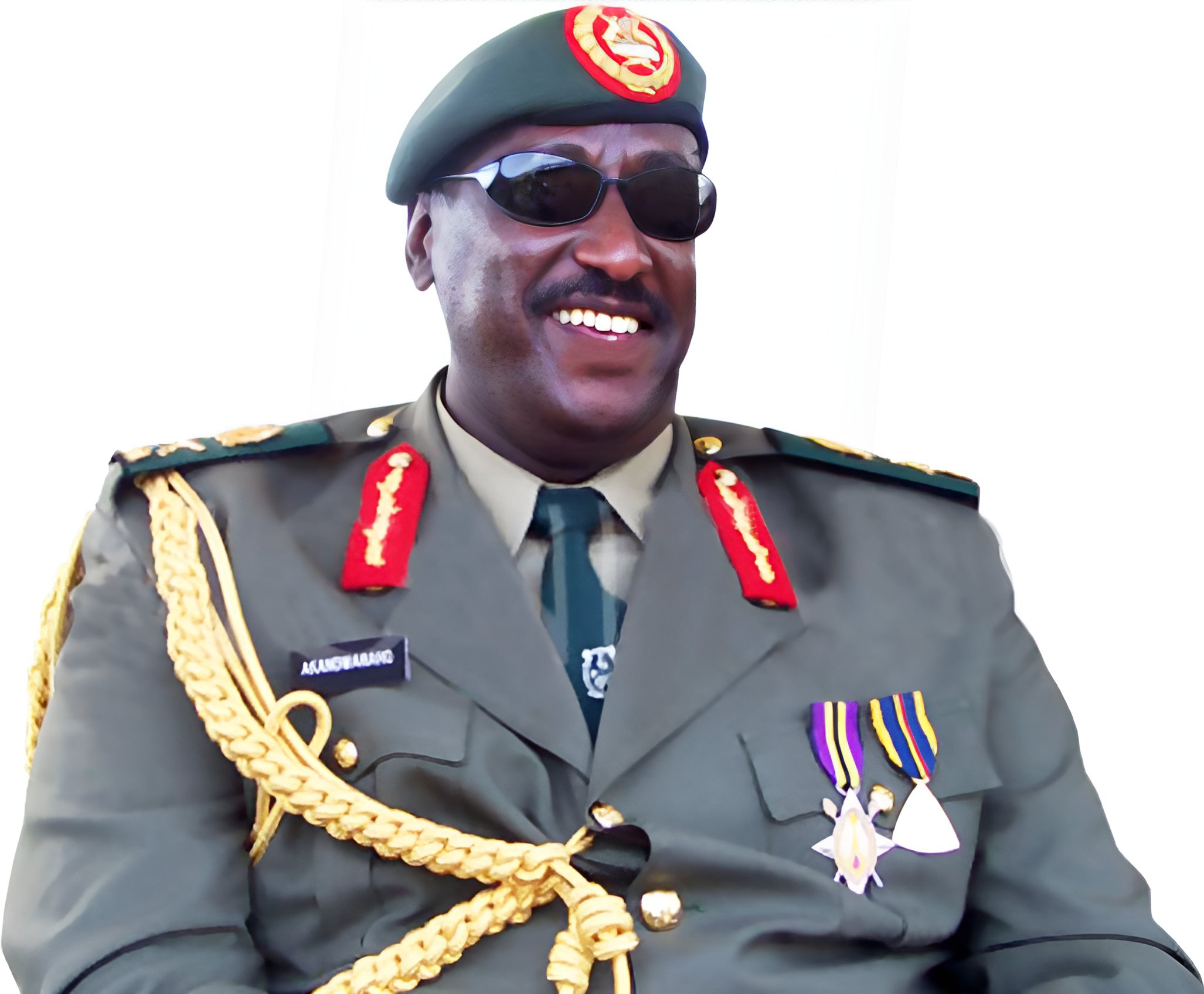
- General Salim Saleh in 2005

Senior Presidential Adviser on Defence and Security
- Incumbent
- Assumed office 2002
- Appointed by: President Yoweri Museveni

Senior Presidential Adviser on Defence and Security
- In office 1996–1998
- Succeeded by: Elly Tumwine

Member of Parliament; for the Uganda People's Defence Force
- In office 2001–2003

Personal details
- Born: Caleb Akandwanaho; 14 January 1960 (age 66) Ntungamo, Protectorate of Uganda
- Party: NRM
- Parent: Amos Kaguta (father) Esteri Kokundeka Nganzi (mother)
- Education: Makerere University; Uganda Senior Command and Staff College; Kimaka, Jinja, Uganda
- Awards: Kabalega Star Medal; Honorary Diploma in cooperatives and business administration

Military service
- Allegiance: Uganda
- Branch/service: Front for National Salvation; Popular Resistance Army; National Resistance Army
- Years of service: 1976–2005
- Rank: General
- Battles/wars: Ugandan Bush War; Post-1986 Northern Uganda Operations-UPDA; First Congo War; Second Congo War; Operation Thunderbolt (1997)

Caleb Akandwanaho, otherwise Salim Saleh (born 14 January 1960) is a retired Ugandan military officer who served in the Uganda People's Defence Force (UPDF), Uganda's armed forces. He is a brother to Yoweri Museveni, and an adviser to the President on military matters. He served as Minister of State for microfinance from 2006 to 2008.Saleh served as a member of Parliament representing the Uganda People's Defence Forces (UPDF) in the seventh Parliament of Uganda. He currently serves as a Senior Presidential Advisor on Defense (SPAD), the Chief Coordinator Operation Wealth Creation (CCOWC), a member of the Presidential Awards Committee, and the Chief Adviser for Karamoja Peace and Technology University (KAPATU) among other roles.

In 2003, Saleh played a key role in peacebuilding efforts in Northern Uganda, particularly in the context of the Lord's Resistance Army (LRA) insurgency. As part of the Presidential Peace Team, he worked on initiatives aimed at encouraging defections among LRA fighters. At a cleansing ceremony for former abductees in Gulu, Saleh publicly expressed emotional distress at the suffering endured by child captives. He also advocated for greater involvement of traditional leaders in the peace process and called for government support to empower their role in conflict resolution.

In April 2025, Saleh was recognised by President Yoweri Museveni during Peace Day celebrations in Yumbe District for his role in securing peace in the West Nile sub-region. The event marked the 23rd anniversary of the 24 December 2002, peace agreement between the Government of Uganda and the Uganda National Rescue Front II (UNRF II), which ended decades of conflict in the area. Saleh, along with other former rebel leaders, was acknowledged for contributions to the peace process and post-conflict stability in West Nile.

In March 2013, Kigumba Cooperative College in Kiryandongo District awarded Saleh an honorary diploma in cooperatives and business administration for his involvement in the promotion of cooperative unions in Uganda. The recognition was given during the institution's 22nd graduation ceremony, where speakers highlighted his previous work with savings and credit cooperative organisations, including during his time as Minister of State for Microfinance. In his address, Saleh discussed the role of cooperatives in local development and efforts to reduce rural-to-urban migration.

== Early Childhood and Family Background ==
General Salim Saleh was born Caleb Akandwanaho on 14 January 1960, in Ibare, Rushenyi County, Ntungamo District, Uganda. He is the son of Mzee Amos Kaguta and Esteeri Kokundeka. Saleh's birth was considered a miracle in his family, as his mother conceived after a nine-year period of childlessness at the age of 42. The name "Akandwanaho," meaning "God is my defender" in Runyankore, was given to him by his mother, while his baptismal name, Caleb, was given by his godparents. His father also gave him the name "Jerwanira," meaning "boldness."

Saleh was the fourth child in the family, with his older siblings including Yoweri Tibuhabirwa Museveni, who later became the President of Uganda, and Violet Kajubiri Froelich. The family experienced hardships, including the death of a younger brother shortly after birth and challenges due to livestock diseases affecting their cattle in Kashari, where they had relocated from Ntungamo.

His early years were marked by modest living conditions and family resilience in the face of adversity. Saleh's upbringing was influenced by strong family bonds and cultural traditions, with his mother Esteeri noted for her exceptional care and attitude, which earned respect in the family and community.

During this period, Saleh's family relocated from Ntungamo to Kashari in Mbarara District, although his mother was less pleased with the new environment due to drought conditions. Despite these challenges, the family maintained their determination, which later shaped Saleh's character and future role in Uganda's military and political history. He is a member of the Anglican Church of Uganda.

== Education ==
General Salim Saleh began his formal education at the age of 5 at Rwankanja Primary School in Kashari, an institution founded by the Church of Uganda. Following his family's relocation to Rwakitura in 1968, he continued his primary education at Rushere Primary School in 1969. He later attended Mbarara Junior School for his primary six studies before transferring to Kako Junior Primary School, where he completed his Primary Leaving Examinations (PLE) in 1975.

After excelling in the PLE, Saleh enrolled at Kako Secondary School in 1976 to pursue his Ordinary Level (O Level) education. His sister, Violet Kajubiri, who was a teaching assistant at Makerere University, recommended the school due to its academic reputation. However, his formal schooling was interrupted when encouraged by his brother Yoweri Museveni to join the Ugandan liberation struggle which he joined. His brother Yoweri Museveni recruited Saleh into the armed struggle for Saleh's own security as Museveni had already declared war on the regime of Idi Amin. Museveni was therefore convinced that Saleh's stay in Uganda at the time he had declared war against the sitting regime would be dangerous for Saleh. Saleh underwent military training in Mozambique as part of this effort, which delayed his completion of secondary education.

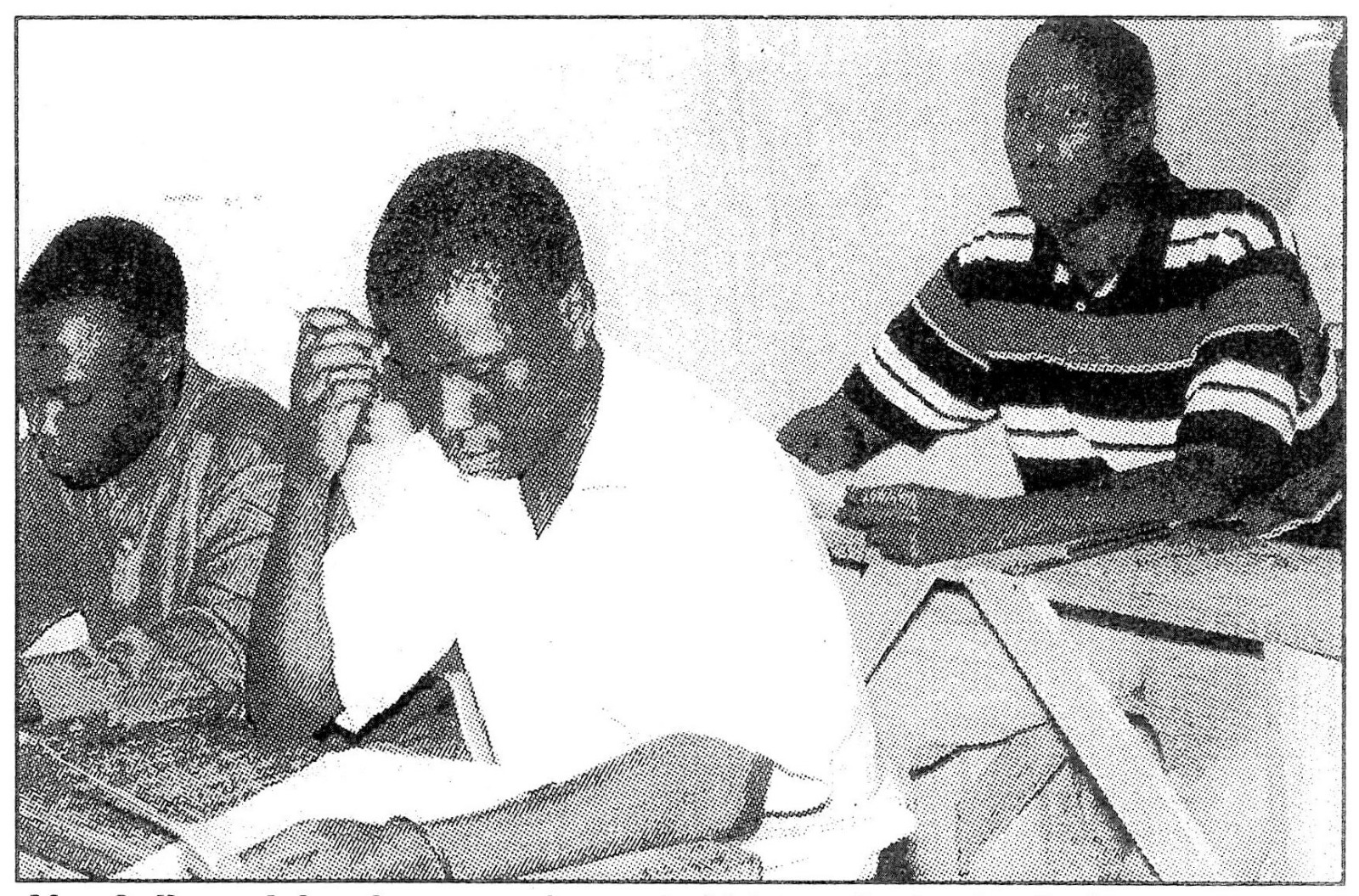
Gen. Salim Saleh sits for his A-Level exams in 2000 at Ngabo Academy

Years later, having risen to the rank of Major General in the Uganda People's Defence Forces (UPDF), Saleh returned to formal education by enrolling at Ngabo Academy in 1999 to complete his Advanced Level (A Level) studies. Ngabo Academy was a recently established school that provided education and accommodation to orphans of soldiers who had died during the National Resistance Army (NRA) liberation war. Saleh's attendance at Ngabo Academy was notable for his active engagement with students and his role in boosting the morale of the school community. He scored 10 points in the A level examinations with an A in Kiswahili and a C5 in General Paper. He however showed disappointment in the result.

In 2004, Saleh joined the pioneer class of the Senior Command and Staff College in Kimaka, Jinja, a key military training institution in Uganda. The college aimed to develop senior military leadership and linked with institutions such as Makerere University. Saleh graduated in August 2005 after submitting a service paper titled "The Acholi Question: Is It Food When The Fighting Stops or Could Food Security Stop The Fighting?" His academic work was praised for its insight into the relationship between food security and conflict resolution.

== Military career ==
=== Political and Early Military Career and Exile (1976–1979) ===
Salim Saleh, joined the Ugandan liberation struggle at the age of 16 in 1976. Due to fears for his safety under Idi Amin's regime, his family sent him to Tanzania, where his elder brother, Yoweri Museveni, was organizing a resistance movement. Saleh travelled to Mozambique and underwent military training with Ugandan exiles in Montepuez alongside Ivan Koreta, Bosco Omure and others under the support of the FRELIMO government.

During this period, Saleh formed close ties with fellow fighters such as Fred Rwigyema. He initially served as a liaison officer between the Front for National Salvation (FRONASA) and the Tanzanian military during the anti-Amin war. He later commanded a combat unit known as the "Red Army" during the advance against Amin's forces, although his direct combat involvement was limited due to his young age. The overthrow of Idi Amin in 1979 marked a pivotal moment in his early military career.

Following Amin's defeat, Saleh was commissioned as a second lieutenant in the Uganda National Liberation Army (UNLA). Due to political tensions and his affiliation with FRONASA, he was posted to remote locations such as Moroto to reduce his influence. The rigged 1980 elections, which led to Milton Obote's return to power, convinced Saleh and Museveni to continue armed resistance.

=== The 1981 Kireka Incident and Imprisonment ===
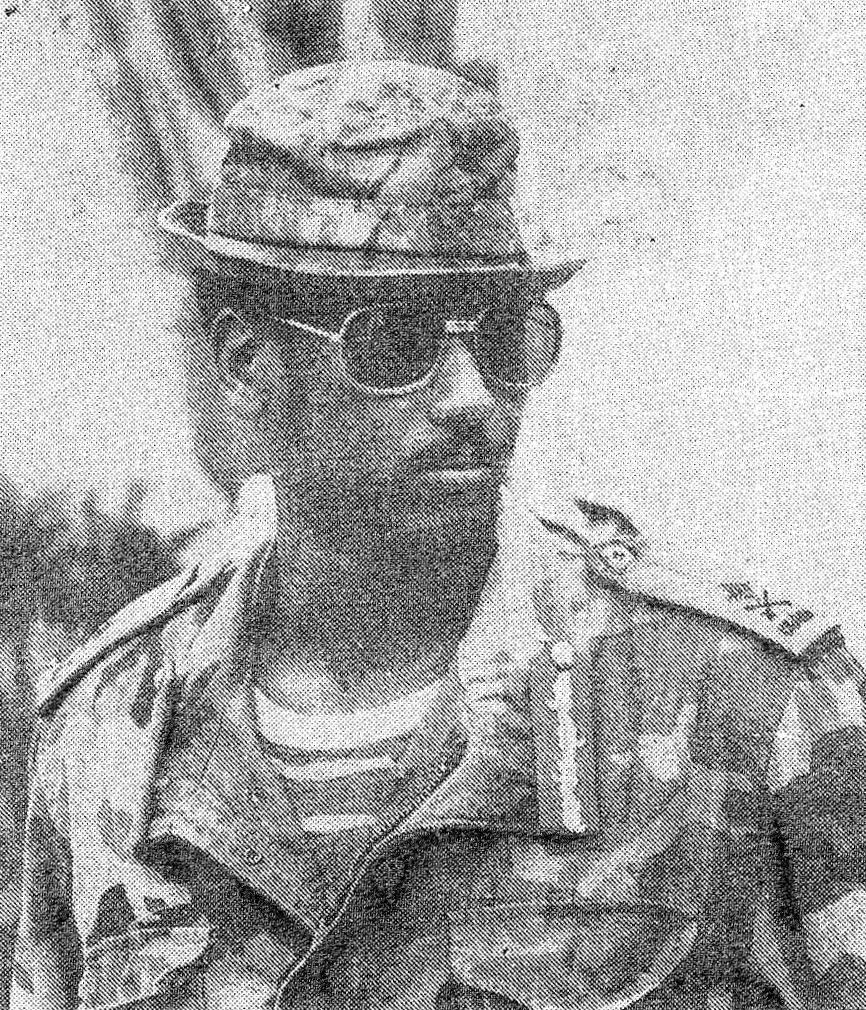
A young Salim Saleh in 1986, shortly after the liberation

In 1981, Saleh intervened at a UNLA roadblock in Kireka to rescue his brother Museveni and family members, who were detained under orders for possible assassination. This act led to Saleh's arrest and imprisonment at Mbuya barracks, where he was reportedly severely beaten but resisted his captors. After intervention by loyalists and threats from Museveni, Saleh was released but was later re-arrested following the failed NRA Kabamba attack and detained in Moroto for several months.

With assistance from Major Dora Kutesa and then-Lieutenant Edward Katumba Wamala, Saleh escaped imprisonment and joined the National Resistance Army (NRA) guerrilla forces in the bush, cementing his role in the resistance.

=== Role in the National Resistance Army (1981–1986) ===
Saleh emerged as a key military leader within the NRA, eventually appointed deputy commander of the First Mobile Force, an elite unit crucial to the guerrilla war. His leadership was prominent during the Luweero Triangle offensive.

On 21 February 1982, Salim Saleh led an attack on a heavily fortified Uganda National Liberation Army (UNLA) detachment stationed at Bukalabi Primary School in the Luweero Triangle. The government troops had entrenched themselves with trenches and were well-armed, posing a significant challenge to the National Resistance Army (NRA) forces.

Saleh, known for his courage and leadership, had previously escaped unscathed in several encounters and was regarded by his soldiers as an inspiring commander. During this particular battle, however, he was seriously wounded when a bullet fractured his arms and caused heavy bleeding. Despite his injuries, Saleh's leadership and the NRA's determined assault contributed to weakening government forces in the region.

The local population of Bukalabi village and the wider Luweero Triangle provided vital support to the NRA fighters during the conflict, a contribution that Saleh has frequently acknowledged. In 1998, he revisited Bukalabi village with a team including a BBC reporter and researchers, where they met with villagers at the old primary school, which still bore bullet holes from the battle. The visit highlighted both the enduring scars of the war and the complex feelings of the community, some of whom expressed disappointment with the perceived neglect and lack of development in the post-conflict period.

He played significant roles in key NRA operations, including successful assaults on Kakiri, Masindi, and Kabamba, which resulted in the capture of substantial weaponry. Saleh's reputation as a courageous and skilled commander grew, and he became instrumental in the NRA's urban offensive leading to the capture of Kampala in January 1986.

=== Capture of Kampala and Post-War Military Leadership ===
As a senior NRA commander, Saleh was pivotal in planning and executing the capture of Kampala, which culminated in the collapse of President Tito Okello's government and the establishment of Yoweri Museveni’s administration. In the post-war period, Saleh was responsible for overseeing the disarmament, demobilization, and reintegration (DDR) of former combatants, a critical task for national stabilization.

Saleh succeeded Elly Tumwine as Army Commander in 1987, and held the post until 1989. He also contributed to the modernization of the Uganda People's Defence Force (UPDF) and efforts to unify the military following years of conflict.

=== Reorganisation of the army and the National Resistance Army (1989-1994). ===
On 27 November 1989, Saleh was redeployed from active military service to command the Reserve Forces. He played a significant role in managing the demobilization of the NRA from 100,000 to 60,000 troops in 1994.

Saleh was tasked with overseeing the welfare and resettlement of approximately 40,000 demobilized soldiers, facilitating vocational training and start-up capital despite limited resources. He was also actively involved in peace negotiations with rebel groups in Northern Uganda and supported military operations to restore stability.

=== Army and economy in Northern Uganda (1996 and earlier). ===
During renewed insurgencies in Northern Uganda in the mid-1990s, Saleh mobilized 15,000 Reserve Forces troops to reinforce operations against rebel groups. Recognizing the importance of economic recovery alongside military efforts, he initiated agricultural marketing programs, notably supporting sesame seed (simsim) production and advocating for local value addition projects.

Saleh has helped rebuild families and transform adversaries into neighbours thereby fostering trust in communities that were once torn apart by war. Saleh has extensively been involved in promoting food security in Uganda as a means to eliminate hunger, providing farmers with better seeds, modern agricultural techniques, and market access to ensure no Ugandan goes hungry. Saleh's combined military and economic initiatives contributed to stabilization and reconstruction efforts in post-conflict northern Uganda.

== Political and Civic Activities ==
In the lead-up to Uganda's 2001 presidential elections, Major General Salim Saleh publicly endorsed President Yoweri Museveni, his elder brother, and actively campaigned on his behalf across multiple regions of the country. Represented at several rallies and events, Saleh advocated for Museveni's re-election and emphasized the need for continued leadership to address persistent national challenges, particularly poverty alleviation. He also pledged to reintroduce micro-loan programs under Citizens’ Concerned, an NGO he was affiliated with, although he acknowledged prior misuse of the scheme.

Saleh spearheaded task forces and campaign outreach activities targeting institutions such as Uganda Christian University and mobilized groups including youth, veterans, and marginalized communities. On multiple occasions, he promised capital injections and entandikwa (startup funding) to various constituencies, often positioning himself as a future leader in poverty alleviation initiatives under Museveni's government.

Amid speculation about his political ambitions, Saleh alternated between expressing interest in elective office, including a potential parliamentary bid in Mbarara Municipality, and denying intentions to seek the presidency. He stated that while others had encouraged him to consider higher political office, his immediate focus was on education and social development. Saleh completed his A-Level studies in 2001, earning ten points, and expressed intent to pursue further education in economics.

=== Parliamentary representation of the army ===
In 2001, Saleh was elected as one of the ten Uganda People's Defence Forces (UPDF) representatives in Uganda's seventh Parliament. He indicated that his priorities in Parliament included improving the welfare of veterans, supporting small-scale businesses, and strengthening the economic participation of local communities. He also advocated for the domestic ownership of strategic assets such as Uganda Commercial Bank, supporting its acquisition by Ugandans through the stock exchange.

Beyond politics, Saleh continued his involvement in community development and sports. He funded the national athletics team's participation in the World Cross Country Championships and maintained his role as patron of the Uganda Amateur Athletics Federation.

During the same year, Saleh addressed controversy surrounding his past business dealings and reiterated his commitment to accountability, announcing plans to publish audited personal financial records. He also responded to ongoing public debate around his involvement in the aborted acquisition of Uganda Commercial Bank and his relationship with former Greenland Bank Managing Director Dr. Sulaiman Kiggundu, later testifying as a defence witness in a related court case.

== Personal setbacks and Entrepreneurial Efforts ==
During the early 2000s, General Salim Saleh encountered significant personal and financial challenges that impacted his initiatives in cooperative economics and agricultural development. He applied to the University of Wisconsin in the United States for practical training related to cooperative economics, hoping to further develop his thesis under guidance. However, he did not receive a response from the institution.

In 2001, during a meeting with President Yoweri Museveni at Kangole in Karamoja where Museveni was overseeing the disarmament of pastoralist communities; Saleh requested assistance to clear personal debts accrued through investments in cooperative economics. This request was declined, with Museveni advising him to sell assets to settle the debts. Despite most of his assets being mortgaged, Saleh proceeded to sell what he could to sustain a coffee development project aimed at organizing Ugandan coffee growers into cooperative enterprises to access niche specialty markets.

Saleh also faced health challenges during this period. After an unsuccessful surgical operation on his arm by Ugandan doctors, he sought medical treatment abroad, including surgery in Germany. While there, he promoted Ugandan coffee to potential customers, generating interest in the unique qualities of the Ugandan specialty coffee brand.

These personal difficulties, including the loss of his mother, caused a delay of approximately six months in the progress of his coffee project. During this time, false rumours about his death circulated in Uganda while he was travelling to London to promote the coffee brand. Upon his return, he was met by a large crowd at Entebbe Airport, highlighting the impact of these rumors on the public.

== False Death Rumors ==
General Salim Saleh has been the subject of several false death rumours. In March 2002, widespread rumours circulated in Kampala and other parts of Uganda that Saleh had died while undergoing medical treatment abroad. State House issued a statement confirming that Lieutenant General Salim Saleh was alive and well, aiming to dispel the rumours. The President's Press Secretary Mary Okurut confirmed this publicly.

Capital Radio FM clarified that it had only reported the rumours and had not announced Saleh's death. Other radio stations, however, broadcast false reports, causing confusion. Saleh himself contacted the media from London to confirm his health, and Citizens Concerned, an organization formed by Saleh supporters, called for an investigation into the false reports.

In April 2002, hundreds of supporters gathered at Entebbe International Airport to welcome Saleh back to Uganda. He addressed the crowd, refuting the rumours by stating, "A dead man cannot talk." Saleh also expressed forgiveness toward those who had spread false news about him. This public appearance helped restore confidence in his wellbeing.

More recently, in 2022, Saleh was again falsely reported dead on social media while engaged in official duties in Kapeeka. These rumours were quickly dispelled by official statements confirming his continued active role in government affairs.

== Controversies ==
Greenland Bank Controversy

Greenland Bank, a financial institution in Uganda, was closed in 1999 following a period of financial instability. Investigations attributed the closure to multiple factors, including mismanagement, regulatory violations, and excessive lending practices. The bank reportedly extended loans totalling approximately UGX 36 billion, which exceeded regulatory limits and contributed to significant financial losses.

Causes of Collapse

The failure of Greenland Bank was linked to systemic weaknesses within the institution. Lending practices that exceeded prudential limits and inadequate oversight were identified as primary factors leading to the bank's insolvency.

Gen. Salim Saleh was a shareholder in Greenland Bank through Caleb International Ltd., owning 8,000 shares valued at approximately UGX 400 million as of 1996. Records indicate that his role was limited to that of an investor and that he was not involved in the bank's management, lending decisions, or daily operations.

Despite public speculation linking Saleh to the bank's operational failures, no evidence has been presented that directly connects him to management decisions or the financial mismanagement that led to the bank's collapse.

=== The outcome is a call for accountability. ===
Following the bank's closure, there were calls for transparency and accountability within Uganda's banking sector. Discussions about the Greenland Bank collapse highlighted the need for improved regulatory frameworks and governance in financial institutions.

Allegations and Conflict with Event Promoters in Uganda's Creative Industry

In 2025, a significant dispute emerged between General Salim Saleh and a faction of event promoters within Uganda's creative sector. The promoters staged a protest by camping outside Saleh's residence in Gulu, accusing him of neglect and demanding compensation for losses related to private entertainment events. The protest escalated to the point where some promoters reportedly used derogatory language against Saleh, including insulting him publicly.

This controversy follows years of General Saleh's involvement in supporting Uganda's creative industry, particularly during the COVID-19 pandemic when he facilitated substantial financial relief packages and advocated for industry organization. Saleh's initiatives included helping to formalize promoter and artist groups and channelling government support through official mechanisms, with the aim of fostering sustainability and accountability in the sector.

Critics within the promoter community argued that Saleh had been selective in his support and has failed to meet all demands for assistance. However, defenders of Saleh emphasize that his support has been voluntary and aimed at systemic reform rather than unconditional bailouts for individual losses. They argue that some promoters have exploited his goodwill, using public demonstrations and social media campaigns to apply pressure and seek personal gain outside of established procedures.

Observers note that Saleh's efforts focus on encouraging professionalization, transparency, and long-term growth in the creative sector, and that the entitlement and aggressive tactics of certain promoters risk undermining these goals. The government and stakeholders continue to explore regulatory frameworks to balance support for creatives while enforcing accountability and reducing exploitation within the industry.

== Public Service and Other Civic Contributions ==
Ministerial Role and Operation Wealth Creation

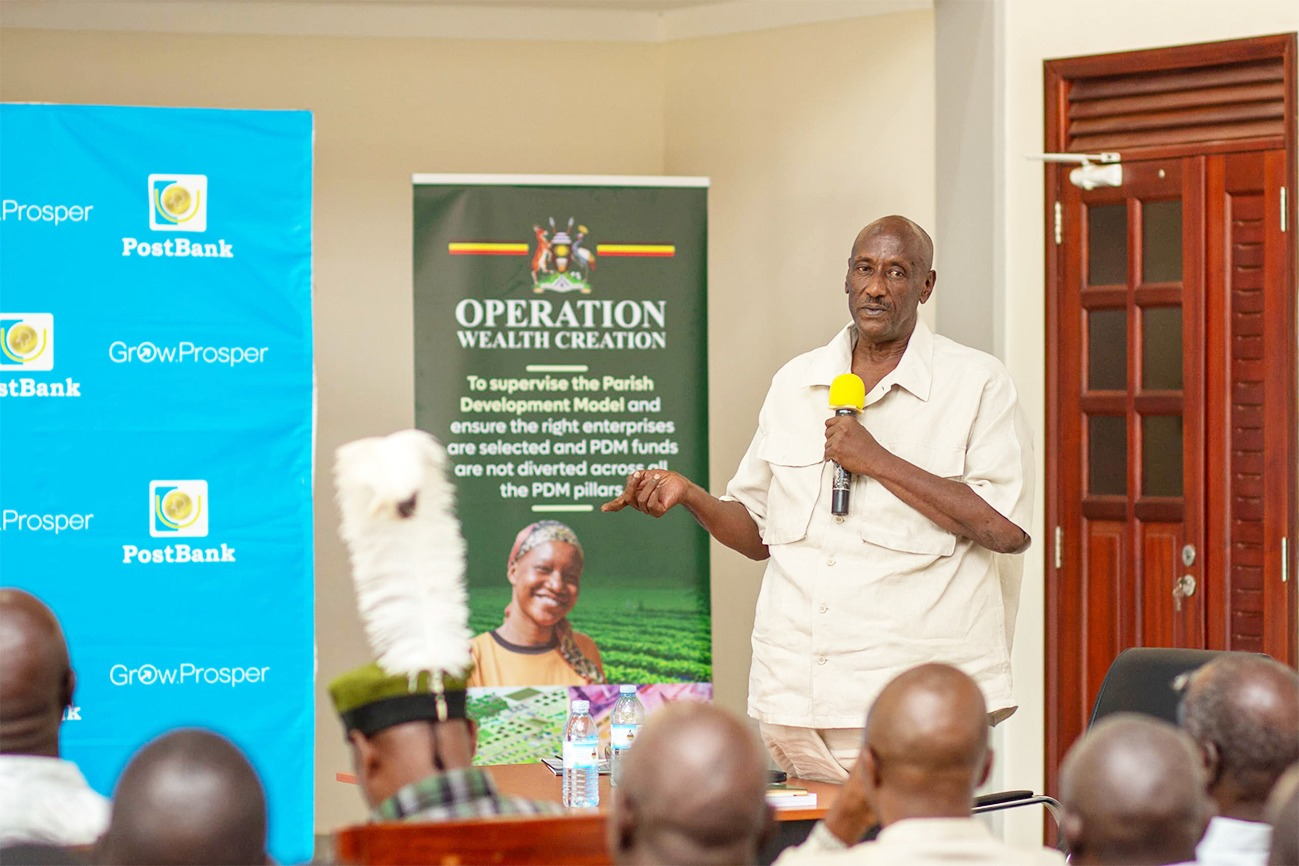
Gen. Salim Saleh speaking at an Operation Wealth Creation (OWC) workshop

Salim Saleh served as Uganda's Minister of State for Microfinance from 2006 to 2008. He resigned from this position, citing bureaucratic obstacles that hindered his ability to effectively promote wealth creation among ordinary Ugandans.

In his capacity as Senior Presidential Adviser on Defense and Security, Saleh also serves as the Chief Coordinator of Operation Wealth Creation (OWC). Launched by President Yoweri Museveni, OWC is a government initiative aimed at accelerating national socio-economic transformation, with a focus on poverty reduction and wealth creation at the household level. The program seeks to improve livelihoods by supporting agriculture, livestock, and small enterprises across Uganda.

=== Peacebuilding and Conflict Resolution in Northern Uganda ===
Salim Saleh has been recognized for his role in ending the conflict in Northern Uganda, particularly in addressing the Lord's Resistance Army (LRA) insurgency. Transitioning from a military commander to a peace advocate, Saleh was tasked by President Museveni to lead efforts in Northern Uganda to restore stability. His strategy emphasized not only disarmament but also reconciliation and social cohesion to ensure sustainable peace.

Witnesses have noted Saleh's diplomatic approach in resolving local disputes, often using his presence and demeanour to encourage conflicting parties toward peaceful settlements. His leadership in peacebuilding has been considered instrumental in transforming conflict zones into areas of development and stability.

=== Food Security Advocacy ===
Saleh has been a vocal advocate for food security in Uganda, emphasizing that access to food is fundamental for development and prosperity. He has promoted agricultural value addition and employment creation across the food production chain. His initiatives support farmers and rural communities, aiming to reduce hunger and boost economic growth through enhanced agricultural productivity.

=== Compassion and Humanitarian Work ===
In 1997, Salim Saleh established the Salim Saleh Foundation for Humanity, which focuses on charitable activities throughout Uganda. The foundation provides support to vulnerable communities, often advocating for humanitarian causes without seeking public recognition. Saleh has encouraged donations to be directed toward such causes rather than personal celebrations or accolades.

His transition from a military figure to a humanitarian has been described as a move from militarism to "humanomics," a term he uses to describe his focus on human-centered development and compassion.

=== Engagement with Uganda's Creative and Music Industry ===
Salim Saleh has played an active role in supporting Uganda's entertainment sector, particularly the music industry, since the early 2000s. Initially engaging on a personal level, he participated in youth events and supported musicians and clubs through financial sponsorship and attendance.

In 2005, Saleh played a key role in reconciling prominent musicians Chameleon and Bebecool, whose rivalry had been escalating, helping to restore peace within Uganda's music community

Between 2005 and 2018, Saleh's involvement deepened, with contributions to music competitions, club events, and support for prominent artists and bands such as Afrigo Band. He has awarded prizes and medals recognizing the preservation of Ugandan musical heritage.

During the COVID-19 pandemic, Saleh facilitated over 9 billion UGX in relief packages targeting musicians, DJs, bouncers, and promoters to mitigate the economic impact on the creative industry.

However, his support has also faced challenges due to exploitation by some event promoters who misused funds and manipulated the system for personal gain. Saleh responded by encouraging musicians to form associations such as the Uganda National Musicians Federation and the Uganda Musicians Association to promote transparency, accountability, and direct access to government support.

Despite misconceptions and criticisms such as accusations of favouritism or undue influence Saleh maintains that his involvement is voluntary and aimed at structural reform and empowerment within the creative sector.

== Honours and recognition ==
=== Commemoration ===
In April 2026, President Yoweri Museveni laid a foundation stone at the National Leadership Institute in Kyankwanzi for the Gen. Caleb Akandwanaho (Salim Saleh) School of Research and the Walter Rodney Block, during a retreat for newly elected National Resistance Movement (NRM) Members of Parliament. The Independent and Uganda Radio Network reported that the school was to be opened in his honour, with Museveni citing Saleh’s role in the National Resistance Army during the 1981–1986 war.

== Personal life ==
He has several children, including:

- Esteri Mugurwa
- Francis Akandwanaho
- Desire Muhooza
- Racheal Kente
- Joseline Kenyana
- Alexander Akandwanaho
- Leviticus Akandwanaho
- Stanley Akandwanaho
- Tyra Akandwanaho
- Christine Akandwanaho
- Keisha Twinomugisha

Military offices
Preceded by General Elly Tumwine	Commander of the National Resistance Army; 1987–1989	Succeeded by Major General Mugisha Muntu
Preceded by NA	Commander of the Reserve Forces; 1990 – 2001; 2006–2008	Succeeded by Lieutenant General Ivan Koreta
Government offices
Preceded by NA	Minister of State for Microfinance; 2006–2008	Succeeded by Ruth Nankabirwa
