= Kaka Bagyenda =

Ugandan military officer and diplomat

Colonel Kaka Bagyenda
- Born: 1 February 1952 (age 74); Western Region, Uganda
- Citizenship: Uganda
- Education: Makerere University (Bachelor of Commerce)
- Occupation: Military officer
- Years active: 1981–present
- Known for: Military Matters
- Title: Uganda's Ambassador to Angola

Colonel Frank Kaka Bagyenda (born 1 February 1952) is a Ugandan retired military officer in the Uganda People's Defence Forces (UPDF). Effective 20 October 2020, He is Uganda's Ambassador to Angola following his appointment by President Yoweri Kaguta Museveni. He is the former Director General of the Internal Security Organisation, Uganda government's counter intelligence agency, responsible for providing national security intelligence to Uganda's policy makers. A position he held between January 2017 to October 2020.

== Background and education ==
He was born in Ibanda District, in Uganda's Western Region, in February 1952. He attended local schools before he was admitted to Makerere University circa 1974. In 1977, he graduated from Makerere with a Bachelor of Commerce degree.

== Civilian career ==
Following his graduation from Makerere University, Bagyenda took up employment in the Uganda Ministry of Public Service. Later, he was transferred to the Uganda Ministry of Agriculture. While there, he was posted to Masindi District, as an agricultural officer.

== Military career ==
In 1981, Bagyenda joined the National Resistance Army (NRA), a rebel guerrilla outfit, led by Yoweri Museveni, who waged the Ugandan Bush War, between 1981 and 1986. He carried out covert operations for the NRA and was instrumental in the capture of Masindi Army Barracks by the NRA on 20 February 1984. To disguise himself from the Uganda National Liberation Army (UNLA) soldiers, he adopted the name Kaka, dropping his birth names Frank Bagyenda. He served in the Ugandan military, rising to the rank of major, before he retired at that rank in 1993.

His assignments in the military included as the commanding officer of a brigade based in Kampala, Uganda's capital city. He then served as head of the directorate of transport, and then as a member of the then Directorate of Military Intelligence (DMI), which today is the Chieftainancy of Military Intelligence (CMI). He also served in Uganda's Northern Region, where he commanded a brigade in the early 1990s.

== In retirement ==
In 1994, he was recalled and conscripted to assist the Rwanda Patriotic Front capture power in Kigali. He remained in Uganda however, engaging in the trucking business in Western Uganda, and setting up Panoma Hotel in Kalangala, in the Ssese Islands.

While in Kalangala, Bagyenda remained an active intelligence operative, playing a role in the disruption of illegal fishing on Lake Victoria. In 2013, he was promoted to the rank of colonel, while in retirement.

In January 2017, he was appointed to head ISO, replacing Brigadier Ronnie Balya, who was appointed Uganda's ambassador to South Sudan, based in Juba.

== See also ==
- Henry Tumukunde
- Jim Muhwezi
- Elly Kayanja
- Katumba Wamala

Military offices
Preceded by Ronnie Balya as Director Internal Security Organisation	Director Internal Security Organisation; 2017–present	Succeeded by Incumbent as Director Internal Security Organisation
