= List of military schools in Uganda =

As of December 2025, Uganda maintained the following military training institutions:

- Bihanga Military Training School: Located at Bihanga, in Ibanda District, Western Region.
- Kalama Armoured Warfare Training School: Located at Kabamba, Mubende District, Central Region
- National Leadership Institute: Located at Kyankwanzi, Kyankwanzi District
- Oliver Tambo School of Leadership: Located at Kaweweta, Nakaseke District
- Uganda Special Forces School: Located at Kaweweta, Nakaseke District
- Sera Kasenyi SFC Training School: Kasenyi, Entebbe.
- Uganda Military Air Force Academy (UPDF Air Force College): Located at Nakasongola in Nakasongola District
- Uganda Military Engineering College: Located at Lugazi, Buikwe District
- UPDF Engineers Brigade, School of Communication and Information Technology (SOCIT) - Located at Lugazi, Buikwe District.
- UPDF School of Information Technology and Office Management (SITOM): Located at Lugazi, Buikwe District.
- Uganda Junior Staff College: Located at Qaddafi Barracks, Jinja
- Uganda Military Academy: Located at Kabamba, Mubende District
- Uganda Senior Command and Staff College: Located at Kimaka, Jinja
- Uganda Urban Warfare Training School - Located at Singo, Nakaseke District
- National Defence College, Uganda: Located in Njeru, Buikwe District
- Karugutu Training School - Located at Karugutu, Ntoroko District.
- School of Military Intelligence and Security: Located at Migyera, Nakasongola District.
- Special Mission Training Centre: Butiaba, Buliisa District. Offers the "Very Important Persons and Special Operations Tactics Course".

== See also ==
- Uganda People's Defense Force
