= David Sejusa =

Ugandan lawyer and military general (born 1954)

David Sejusa (born Tinyefuza; 13 November 1954), is a Ugandan lawyer, retired military general and former MP. He was the coordinator of intelligence services and a senior presidential adviser to President of Uganda Yoweri Museveni. He served as army commander and also a member of High Command UPDF, the UPDF defence council, and a member of parliament representing the Uganda People's Defence Force, before having a falling-out with Museveni and forming the Freedom and Unity Front in exile in the United Kingdom following being charged for plotting a coup.

== Early life and education ==
David Tinyefuza was born on 13 November 1954.

He attended Nyakasura School. He holds the degree of Bachelor of Laws Honours (LLB) and Master of Laws (LLM) from Makerere University. He also attended the Law Development Centre for the diploma in legal practice where he left after a clerkship for cadet training in Tanzania. He was also a student leader(head of students' guild) at Makerere University. He has obtained the senior command qualifications of PSC from the Uganda Senior Command and Staff College at Kimaka, Jinja, Uganda. He also holds a certificate in information technology from an institution in Canada. He also attended the police cadet course in Tanzania and senior command strategic course.

== Military career ==
Prior to 1981, Tinyefuza was a policeman with the Uganda Police Force serving as Assistant Superintendent of Police. In 1981, he became a combatant in the Uganda Bush War between the Uganda National Liberation Army (UNLA) of Milton Obote and the National Resistance Army (NRA) of Yoweri Museveni, from 1981 until 1986. For a period of 10 years following the victory of the NRA in 1986, he served as a member of the National Resistance Army Council (NRAC) and the National Executive Committee (NEC). Between 1989 and 1992, he served as Minister of State for Defence. In 1993, he was appointed Presidential Adviser on Peace and Security, serving in that capacity until 1997. He was appointed Senior Presidential Adviser and Coordinator of Intelligence in 2005, a position he held until 2013.

He served as army commander and also a member of High Command UPDF and the UPDF defence council. He changed his surname from Tinyefuza to Sesuja in 2012.

On 31 August 2022, Sejusa and 34 other generals were retired from the UPDF.

== Politics ==
The party was founded in November 2013 with an official announcement later made in London, United Kingdom, where former General David Sejusa was in exile. Sejusa said of President Yoweri Museveni: "He's had enough time. He can leave and go, and we start a new process of national healing. And we are organising ourselves, we are establishing a constitutional rule which he destroyed." Sejusa denied seeking the presidency and said that it was "a waste of time" to run against Museveni within the structures of the current system. Two months earlier, Museveni challenged Sejusa to try to overthrow him, but added that whoever uses violence would be stopped. "If Sejusa wants to use force, let him come." In turn, Sejusa responded to questions of whether he would use force to bring change and said: "It's not so much that we want to do so. But if he continues to unleash terror on the population ours will be self defence."

In May 2013, Sejusa parted ways with Uganda's establishment and left the country for England. Sejusa made allegations that Museveni's son, Muhoozi Kainerugaba, was being prepared to eventually simply replace his father as president, in effect establishing a monarchy. Kainerugaba denied the allegations, while his father made no public statements about his future plans.

=== Freedom and Unity Front ===
Freedom and Unity Front
- Chairman: Amii Omara-Otunnu
- Secretary: Vincent Magombe
- Founder: David Sejusa
- Founded: November 2013
- Dissolved: 2014
- Headquarters: United Kingdom

Following a rift with the establishment in May 2013 about Ugandan President Yoweri Museveni's son, Muhoozi Kainerugaba, over allegation of nepotism and that he would eventually simply replace his father as president, a motion Kainerugaba denied, he founded the Freedom and Unity Front (FUF) while in exile in London. Sejusa had earlier called on Ugandans to "build alternative capacity" and remove Museveni. He added, the week following his departure as an MP representing the military, that "no one should imagine that Museveni will be removed through elections." He was charged for plotting a coup.

In November 2013, while living in exile in England, Sejusa was removed from his seat as a member of Uganda's parliament due to his prolonged absence. That same month, Sejusa and others announced the formation of the Freedom and Unity Front as a new political party in Uganda. The new party united Free Uganda (FU), Citizens in the Defence of the Constitution (CDC) and other organisations. The October 2013 Uhuru Declaration, signed by the party's Publicity Secretary Vincent Magombe, describes the FUF's purpose.

The party was formed out of uniting Free Uganda (FU) and Citizens in the Defence of the Constitution (CDC), and it opposed President Yoweri Museveni over allegations of corruption and nepotism. It was officially headed by Amii Omara-Otunnu, but does not appear to have lasted even a year.

==== Political context ====
The government of Ugandan President Yoweri Museveni, which has been in power since 1986, formerly banned other political parties, but in a 2005 referendum, opposition parties were re-legalised.

==== Foundation ====
The week following former General David Sejusa's departure as an MP representing the military, he noted that "no one should imagine that Museveni will be removed through elections." He had further called upon Ugandans to "build alternative capacity" by choosing another leader. He also accused Museveni of subverting the East African Community by marginalising the leaders of Burundi and Tanzania by not inviting them for the body's summits. Sejusa accused Museveni of not only starting the M23 rebellion by militarising the rebels, including offering financial aid, but acting like a "chameleon" in "want[ing] to bring peace." Sejusa had called on Ugandans to "start a new process of national healing" with the removal of Museveni, that electoral politics under Museveni would yield no change and that though violence would not be initiated it could be used as "self defence." In the second half of 2013, Museveni issued a challenge to Sejusa to bring about a change in government, but also added that he would not tolerate violence as a means to that end. In turn, Sejusa responded to questions of whether he would use force to bring change and said: "It's not so much that we want to do so. But if he continues to unleash terror on the population ours will be self defence."

Sejusa criticised Museveni and called for "a new process of national healing" and that the party was an attempt at organising so as to "establishing a constitutional rule which he destroyed." Yet he denied seeking the presidency for himself as it was "a waste of time" to run against Museveni within the structures of the current system. In a related measure, former three-time presidential candidate Colonel Kizza Besigye also said "whether united or not, you cannot dislodge Museveni through an election he [Museveni] organises, supervises and controls," due its status as a military government. Instead he suggested civil disobedience would be more effective in bringing about regime change.

FUF was founded on 6 October 2013, with Amii Omara-Otunnu appointed as chairman. Omara-Otunnu was at the time a tenured professor in history, and was also UNESCO Chair in Comparative Human Rights at the University of Connecticut from 2000 until 2016.

==== Issues and achievements ====
According to the party at its establishment, important issues were: tackling what it sees as a decrease in "human rights," particularly a rise in extrajudicial killings; an alleged "selective justice" on the part of the government; a lack of accountability, transparency and prevalent corruption; and a decrease in civil society organisations in the immediate preceding years.

On 14 December, the party launched its first manifesto. chairman was Amii Omara-Otunnu wrote in July 2014 that the FUF was formed "to champion national reconciliation and healing, to banish the culture of violence and militarism that has blighted the lives of millions of citizens through gratuitous use of force, to fashion institutional mechanisms for democracy, accountability and checks and balances on power, to inspire hope and faith in the future, and to seek understanding and solidarity from the international community to assist us in our struggle, is well and robust and continues to grow in leaps and bounds".

Omara-Otunnu wrote in July 2014 that since the formation of the FUF, there had been diplomatic and political progress, and that the movement had created international awareness of the "criminality" of President Museveni policies, that had caused many deaths and undermined international peace and security in the region. He wrote that FUF had worked hard to form productive working relationships with diverse Ugandan groups, for the common good of the country. FUF had created partnerships with a number of other groups, including the Federal Alliance for Democracy and Development (FADDU).

The FUF chairman was Amii Omara-Otunnu; David Sejusa was also a party leader; and Vincent Magombe was publicity secretary.

==== Status ====
It was reported that the Ugandan Army believed thought that Sejusa was involved in "subversive activities", and declared him a deserter, threatening to charge him with treason if he returned to Uganda.

There has been no update on the FUF since 2014. Sejusa returned to Uganda from self-exile in London in December 2014, invited by Museveni himself, and there was no mention of the FUP.

He faced court martial upon return to Uganda, retiring from the UPDF in 2016; in retirement he has established, more positive relationship with political figures, being present at the funeral of Margaret Kibazibira in 2025.

== Personal life ==
Sesuja married Juliet Tinyefuza.

=== Name change ===
On 17 February 2012, David Tinyefuza officially changed his name to David Sejusa. He said that Sejusa is a family name that is also reflected on some of his academic documents but that he had abandoned it "around secondary school level" but that he would re-claim as "everybody back home" refers to him as such. He added: "There is nothing in reverting to my original name. It is comrades like you who didn't know it was my name but those elder comrades have always referred to me as such. And I suggest that from today you quote me as Gen. David Sejusa."

The Sejusa name is a Luganda rendering that is loosely translated as "I have no regrets;" it also has the same meaning in the Ankole rendition of Tinyefuza, which he said was a reason to take a new identity.
