= Elly Tumwine =

Ugandan general (1954 - 2022

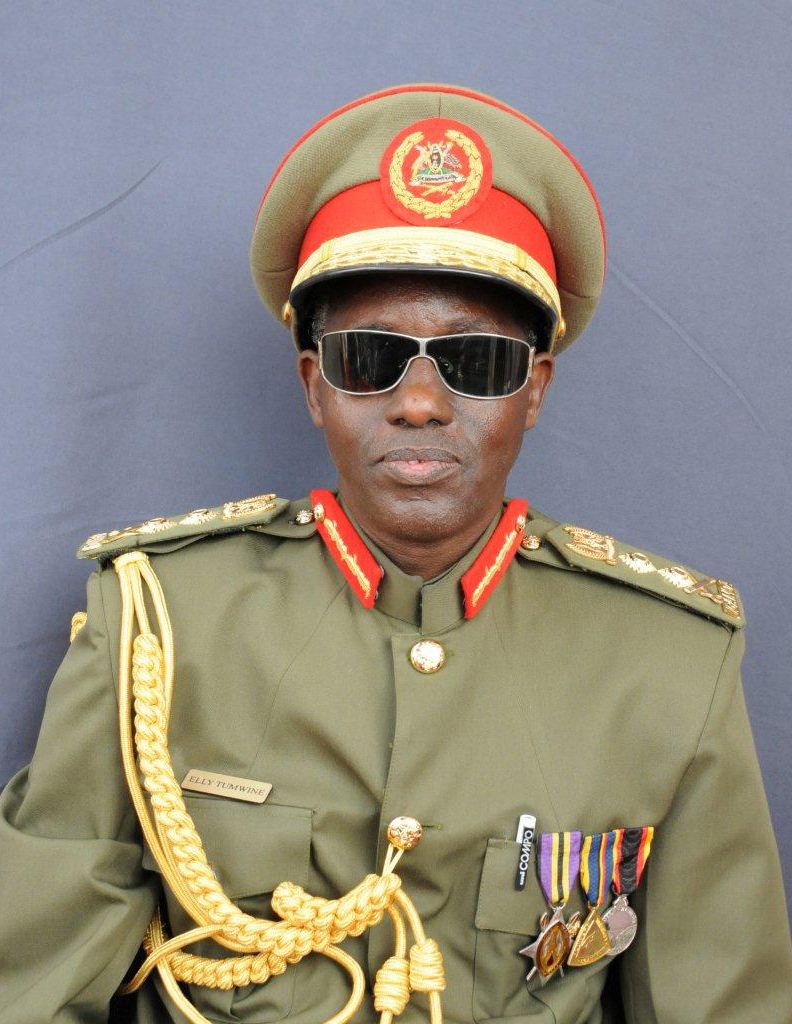
- Born: 12 April 1954; Uganda
- Died: 25 August 2022 (aged 68); Agha Khan Hospital, Nairobi
- Education: Makerere University (Bachelor of Arts in Fine Art) (Diploma in Education); Tanzania Military Academy (Officer Cadet Course); Uganda Senior Command and Staff College (Senior Command and Staff Course)
- Military career
- Branch: Uganda People's Defence Force
- Service years: 1981–2022
- Rank: General

General Elly Tuhirirwe Tumwine (12 April 1954–25 August 2022) was a Ugandan military officer, designer, visual artist, and educator. He was the former Security Minister in the Cabinet of Uganda, from March 2018 until 2021. He retired from active military service in July 2022.

He served as commander of the National Resistance Army from 1984 to 1987. He was one of the highest-ranking members of the Ugandan military who recently called on police to shoot at protesters. He also ordered the military to kidnap, illegally incarcerate and send opposition members to be tried in military courts based on trumped up charges, which resulted in Bobi Wine supporters suing for human rights violations. This led the United States to sanction the Ugandan generals over human rights abuses. He was a member of the Ugandan Parliament, representing the Uganda People's Defence Force (UPDF).

== Early life and education ==
Tumwine was born on 12 April 1954, in Burunga, Mbarara District. He attended Burunga Primary School, Mbarara High School and St. Henry's College Kitovu, before joining Makerere University, gaining a BA in fine arts combined with a Dip. Ed in 1977. He specialised in the history of art painting.

He subsequently completed the cadet officers course at the Tanzania Military Academy at Monduli. He also attended the senior command course at the Uganda Senior Command and Staff College at Kimaka, in Jinja, Uganda, being a member of the pioneer class that graduated in 2005. Tumwine also held further military qualifications from the military academy in Vystry, in the Soviet Union.

== Military career ==
In 1978, he interrupted his teaching career to join the FRONASA forces led by Yoweri Museveni to fight the Idi Amin regime. In 1981, when Museveni went to the bush to form the National Resistance Army (NRA), Tumwine went with him. He is reported to have fired the first shot in the National Resistance Army War, which propelled the National Resistance Army and National Resistance Movement into power in Uganda in 1986. During the fighting between the NRA and the UNLA, Tumwine sustained facial injuries that led to loss of sight in one eye. In 1984, Tumwine was named Commander of the Army, a post he held until 1987, when he was succeeded by General Salim Saleh. Over the years, he served in various positions, including:

- Minister of State for Defence in 1989
- Director General of the External Security Organization (ESO) from 1994 until 1996
- Presidential Adviser from 1996 until 1998
- Chairman of the High Command Appeals Committee from 1986 until 1999

He was also continuously represented the UPDF in the Ugandan Parliament since 1986.

In September 2005, he was promoted to the rank of general in the UPDF and named to chair the UPDF General Court Marshal.

On Monday 16 May 2022, Tumwiine was among thirty-four generals who were retired from the UPDF.

== Human rights ==
Tumwine was regularly connected to violence against Ugandans. After Bobi Wine was arrested on 18 November 2020 in Luuka, protests broke out which were met with excessive violence.

== Design and art ==
Immediately after graduating from Makerere University in 1977, Tumwine embarked on a teaching career in various schools in Uganda, teaching fine art. After the National Resistance Movement victory in 1986, he resumed his art. While serving as the commander of the NRA, he designed the flag, the emblem and the green and camouflage uniforms of the army. He was appointed the chairman of the board of trustees of the National Cultural Centre. In 1992, he launched his company, The Creations Limited, to promote the arts and crafts industry, encouraging artistic values and creativity. The company is a member of several Ugandan organisations, including:

- Uganda Manufacturers Association
- Uganda Small Scale Industries Association
- Uganda Leather Allied Industries Association

== Death ==
Tumwine collapsed at a wedding and was admitted to Nakasero Hospital in Kampala, sometime in July 2022. When his condition deteriorated, he was flown to the Aga Khan University Hospital, Nairobi. He died there on 25 August 2022, aged 68.

Military offices
Preceded by Lieutenant Colonel Sam Magara	Commander of the National Resistance Army; 1984 – 1987	Succeeded by General Salim Saleh
