= External Security Organisation =

Ugandan intelligence agency

Coordinates: 00°19′13″N 32°35′12″E

- ESO

Agency overview
- Formed: 1987
- Jurisdiction: Government of Uganda
- Headquarters: Hannington Road, Nakasero; Kampala, Uganda
- Agency executive: Director-general, Joseph Ocwet
- Parent agency: Uganda Ministry of Security

The External Security Organisation (ESO) is a government agency, mandated to collect, analyse and process information related to external security threats. Its objective is informing national policy makers in Uganda. Its headquarters are located in a three-story office building that the agency owns on Hannington Road, on Nakasero Hill, in Kampala, Uganda's capital and largest city.

== Overview ==
ESO was established by an Act of Parliament, the Security Organisations Act 1987. The agency focuses on the assessment of external security threats to Uganda. In the 2014/2015 financial year, the agency was allocated a budget of UGX:14 billion. Sometimes ESO's activities overlap with those of other government spy agencies, including the Internal Security Organisation and the Chieftaincy of Military Intelligence.

== Administration ==
The Director-general serves as the chief executive of the government agency. She or he is appointed by the President of Uganda and reports directly to the president and to any other person or entity approved by the president. The Director-general has directors under her/his supervision, who report directly to her/him. The current director-general is Joseph Ocwet, a former career diplomat.

== See also ==
- Internal Security Organisation
