= Violet Kajubiri =

Ugandan legislator

Violet Kajubiri Froelich
- Born: 1949 (age 76–77); Uganda
- Education: Makerere University (B.Sc., Diploma in Education); Hohenheim University (M.Sc., PhD Zoology)
- Occupations: Legislator, zoologist, educator
- Spouse: Hilmar Froelich
- Children: 4
- Relatives: Yoweri Museveni (brother); Salim Saleh (brother)

Violet Kajubiri Froelich (born 1949) is a Ugandan legislator, zoologist, educator, and public servant. She is the sister of Ugandan president Yoweri Museveni and Gen. Salim Saleh.

she has built a career in education, wildlife conservation, and public administration.

== Background and education ==
Kajubiri was born in 1949.

In the seventies, she attained a bachelor's degree and a concurrent diploma in education, majoring in biology and chemistry from Makerere University.

She worked at Makerere University as a special assistant in the department of zoology. During this time, she got a scholarship from Germany, and went to Hohenheim University for her master's and PhD in zoology.

== Career ==
Kajubiri served as the general secretary of the Wildlife Clubs of Uganda. She was appointed to be a member of the Education Service Commission in 2010. Between 2008 and 2009, she worked as a consultant for the state of Lower Saxony (Germany) on Education and Development. In 2001 to 2004, Kajubiri was also a consultant for Protestant Development Aid in Germany.

== Personal life ==
Kajubiri is married to German national Hilmar Froelich, and the couple has four children.
