= Uganda Junior Staff College =

Military school in Uganda

- Type: Staff College
- Established: 2006; 20 years ago
- Commandant: Brigadier Chris Ogwal
- Location: Jinja, Jinja District, Uganda; 00°27′00″N 33°12′18″E
- Location in Uganda

The Uganda Junior Staff College, is a staff college in Uganda. Typically, graduates are commanders in the Uganda People's Defence Force (UPDF). Other African countries also send their cadets to the college for training. Past graduates of the college have come from Kenya, Tanzania, Rwanda, South Sudan, and other African nations.

== History ==
The creation of the Uganda Junior Staff College was first announced by Chief of Defense Forces Aronda Nyakairima in February 2006. In May 2006, the college graduated its initial class of 39 military officers. The college was officially commissioned by President Yoweri Museveni, who is also the commander in chief of the UPDF.

== Mission ==
The college aims to train middle military commanders in various areas of expertise to acquire the skills needed to lead others in battle and in peacekeeping missions. Subjects include international humanitarian law, the French language, basic military intelligence, and the pre-senior command and staff course, for those destined for higher command responsibilities.

== See also ==
- National Resistance Army
- Uganda Senior Command and Staff College
- Uganda Military Academy
- List of military schools in Uganda
