= Kiira College Butiki =

Secondary school in Butiki-mataala, Uganda

Information
- School type: Boarding school
- Motto: Discipline & Hard Work
- Established: 1959; 67 years ago
- Headmaster: Moses Ssemwanga
- Gender: Boys
- Age: 13 to 18
- Enrollment: c. 1,000-1,200

Kiira College Butiki (KCB), commonly referred to as Butiki, is an all-boys boarding public secondary school (high school) located in Jinja district, in the Eastern region of Uganda. The school is located on Butiki hill, in Namulesa trading center, along the Jinja-Kamuli Highway. It is approximately 14 kilometers (approx. 8.7 miles) from Jinja town.

The school was named after River Nile (known as Kiira among the local Basoga people). The Nile derives its source from Lake Victoria in Jinja.

The school motto is "Discipline & Hard Work".

The school was founded in 1959 as a public secondary school. Unlike in developed countries like the US, the funds used to run public schools are from both the government (through the Ministry of Education) and from private tuition agreed upon by school PTA committees of the respective school; a public-private interaction funding. Teacher salaries are mainly paid by the Ugandan government. However, teachers also receive allowances from the tuition paid by the students.

Note that unlike in countries like the United Kingdom or the US, boarding schools in Uganda do not identify students as being from a high social class. Boarding schools are a convenient way to ensure that students, mainly those from rural places (60% of attendees), attend school without transportation inconveniences.

== History ==
The school was founded by the Busoga local administration (known as the "lukiiko" in Lusoga) in 1959 to improve education among Basoga boys. The only school in Busoga region that was for boys was Busoga College Mwiri. However, while initially Mwiri was intended to offer education to only sons of members of the Busoga royal family, including chiefs and other prominent Busoga political figures, with a few locals, this vision was destroyed when Mwiri (presumably from political pressures) embarked on recruiting students from other areas in Uganda. Competition for enrollment became so stiff that the enrollment of the Basoga boys was dismal. This led the Busoga local lukiiko to establish another boys-only school to serve Basoga, hence Kiira College Butiki. However, the same problems from Busoga College Mwiri haunted Butiki, which also embarked on national recruitment for boys from other areas of Uganda. There is a long known historical academic "rivalry" between students from Mwiri and Butiki.

Butiki falls in the category of public schools in Uganda. Public schools are mainly Government aided institutions through the Ministry of Education. Until recently, (in the mid-1990s), Public schools were considered to be more powerful in academic terms compared to private schools. However, with the introduction of a privatized economy by the NRM government in the 1990s, many private schools embarked on a policy of recruiting academic staff from public schools, and some private schools have recently started outperforming the historical public schools (based on the pass rate in National exams such as UCE and UACE).

However, there's still a historical academic pride that exists among many graduates of the historical (established before the late 1960s) public schools and entry into these public schools is still a competitive enterprise for students.

== International partnerships ==
Kiira College Butiki shares a partnership link with Hampton School in Hampton, London in England.Where by having a hall at the school named Hampton.

== Student body ==
=== Enrollment ===
Enrollment is only for male students. The age range is between 13 and 18. However, it is not uncommon to find students aged 20 and above but rarely above 25. Age is not a factor the school considers in student enrollment. Total school enrollment is between 1000 and 1200 students.

=== Citizenship ===
Most students enrolled are Ugandans (99%), however, it is not uncommon to find foreign students from neighbouring countries like Kenya, Tanzania, Rwanda or South Sudan enrolled in the school. The practice of enrolling foreign students is common among Ugandans schools, especially Private schools. It is believed by some residents of other East African Community partner countries that the education system in Uganda is superior.

=== Accommodation ===
Accommodation is provided on-campus for all students. There are 7 dormitories on campus (aka "houses") to accommodate the whole student population. All beds are bunk beds (each bunk bed having 3 levels). Students do come with their own beddings and mattresses. The houses include Nile house, Aggrey house, Mulondo house, Kyabazinga house, Cohen house, Henry Muloki house aka HM and the newly opened Nadiope house.

== Headmasters ==
- Arthur Nyanga. He was the first headmaster appointed to Butiki. He was in post from 1959 to 1962.
- Robert Freak. First post-independence headmaster from 1962 to 1970
- Arthur Kisubi, 1971 to 1972
- A. Kanyago, 1972 to 1973
- A. Obone, 1973 to 1974
- W.J Musanyana, 1975 to 1980
- John Richard Isabirye, 1981 to 2001
- Daudi H. Mulongo, 2001 to 2011
- Daniel Douglas Kaima, 2011 to 2019
- Kisame Michael, 2020 to 2023
- Moses Ssemwanga, 2023 to date

== Notable alumni ==
- Michael Kyomya, clergyman, Anglican bishop of Busoga Diocese.
- Moses Sekibogo (aka Mowzey Radio)
- Timothy Batabaire, sportsman.
- Abdu Katuntu: member of parliament in Uganda (FDC, representing Bugweri constituency in Bugiri district, Eastern Uganda). He is a lawyer by training.
- Humphrey Nabimanya: Social entrepreneur and radio personality
- Ivan Koreta: Retired 4-star general. Former Deputy Chief of Defence Forces in the Uganda People's Defence Forces, the second-highest rank in the Ugandan military.
