= Shaban Bantariza =

Ugandan military officer (1963–2020)

Colonel (Retired) Shaban Bantariza
- Born: 1963; Mitooma District
- Died: 27 October 2020 (aged 56–57); Kampala
- Citizenship: Uganda
- Education: Makerere University; Uganda Senior Command and Staff College
- Occupations: Retired Military Officer, Teacher
- Years active: 1985 to 2020
- Known for: Military

Shaban Bantariza (1963 – 27 October 2020) was a Colonel in the Uganda People's Defense Force (UPDF). He served as the deputy director of the Uganda Media Centre and deputy government spokesperson, from June 2015.

== Background and education ==
Bantariza was born in Mitooma District in Uganda's Western Region, circa 1963. He attended St. Leo's College, Kyegobe, in Fort Portal, Kabarole District for his O-Level studies. He then joined the Catholic brotherhood, where he trained as an elementary school teacher.

While pursuing a course at Makerere University in 1985, he abandoned his studies and joined the National Resistance Army, led by Yoweri Museveni. He attended guerrilla bootcamp in the Kabarore area, in foothills of the Rwenzori Mountains. He also attended and graduated from the Uganda Senior Command and Staff College, having studied the senior command course offered annually at the college.

== Career ==
Bantariza served as the UPDF spokesperson from 2000 to 2002 and from 2003 to 2006. For a period of time, prior to February 2009, Bantariza, at the rank of lieutenant colonel, served as the commander of the Oliver Tambo Leadership School, in Kaweweta, Nakaseke District, in Uganda's Central Region. On 26 February 2009, he was appointed commandant of the National Leadership Institute (NALI), in Kyankwanzi, Kyankwanzi District. He served in that capacity until he was relieved of his duties on 7 October 2011.

In June 2013, he was appointed Deputy Executive Director of the National Media Centre. On 2 July 2013, at the rank of colonel, he was arrested, charged with embezzlement and remanded to Makindye Military prison by the General Court Martial on charges of alleged fraud. After proceedings that lasted nearly three years, the Court Martial, chaired by Major General Levi Karuhanga, acquitted Colonel Bantariza due to lack of evidence against him, on 14 April 2015. On 24 June 2015, following his acquittal by the general court martial, he resumed work at the Uganda Media Centre, the president of Uganda having directed in writing that Bantariza resumes work.

== Retirement from the UPDF ==
On 28 September 2015, Bantariza retired from the UPDF. He continued to serve as the deputy government spokesperson until his death on 27 October 2020.

== Death ==
He died on 27 October 2020, at Mulago National Referral Hospital, where he had been admitted two days before, complaining of chest discomfort, fatigue and cough. Before his death, his samples had tested positive for COVID-19. He also suffered from diabetes mellitus and systemic hypertension.

== See also ==
- Aronda Nyakairima
- Felix Kulayigye
- Nobel Mayombo
- Uganda Ministry of Information and Communications Technology
