= Internal Security Organisation =

Uganda government's counter intelligence agency

Coordinates: 00°19′19″N 32°34′57″E

- ISO

Agency overview
- Formed: 1986
- Jurisdiction: Government of Uganda
- Headquarters: Nakasero, Kampala, Uganda
- Agency executive: Major Arthur Mugyenyi, Director General
- Parent agency: Uganda People's Defence Force

The Internal Security Organisation (ISO) is the Uganda government's counter intelligence agency responsible for providing national security intelligence to Uganda's policy makers. It also engages in covert activities at the request of the President of Uganda. Founded in 1986, the organisation took over the duties first performed by Military Intelligence. Its headquarters are in Nakasero, Kampala.

== History and function ==
ISO was established by an Act of Parliament, the Security Organisations Act 1987. Like all intelligence organisations, its main function is to ensure the stability and longevity of the state. It does this through monitoring priority government programmes that are critical to the well-being of the state, as well as collecting intelligence on locally based groups engaging in or intending to engage in acts of subversion, sabotage or destabilising the country.

== Director general ==
The first director general was Major General Jim Katugugu Muhwezi. He led ISO from 1986 until 1996. He is the longest serving spy chief at the organization to date. He recruited and trained Dr Amos Mukumbi and Brigadier Ronnie Balya, each of whom was later to serve as director general. Under the Director General (DG), are a number of directors who report directly to the DG. Others who have served as director generals at ISO include: Philip Idro, Lieutenant General Henry Tumukunde, Brigadier Elly Kayanja, Dr Amos Mukumbi, Brigadier Ronnie Balya, and Colonel Kaka Bagyenda Charles Oluka . The current ISO Director General is Major Arthur Mugyenyi.

== Composition ==
ISO is composed of professional intelligence officers recruited from all over Uganda and trained at its training institute, the Institute of Intelligence and Security Studies. Upon being passed out, the operatives are sworn to protect Ugandans and their property and are deployed all over the country. They include PISO's, GISO's, DISO's and RISO's.

== See also ==
- External Security Organisation
