= Uganda Senior Command and Staff College =

Military school for senior officers in Uganda

- Kimaka, Jinja District in Uganda

Site information
- Type: Military School
- Owner: Uganda People's Defence Force
- Controlled by: UPDF
- Open to the public: No

Location
- Location of Uganda Senior Command and Staff College, Kimaka, Jinja District, Uganda.
- Coordinates: 00°27′09″N 33°11′55″E

Site history
- Built: 2003
- Built by: Uganda People's Defence Force Engineers
- In use: Since 2003
- Fate: Intact, Operational

Garrison information
- Current commander: Major General George Igumba
- Past commanders: Lieutenant General Andrew Gutti; Major General Benon Biraaro; General Ivan Koreta

Airfield information
- Elevation: 1,190 m (3,904 ft) AMSL

The Uganda Senior Command and Staff College (USCSC) is a training facility for senior commanders in the Uganda People's Defense Force (UPDF), including the army, air force, and special forces.

== Location ==
The facility is located in Kimaka, a suburb of the city of Jinja, approximately 82 kilometres (51 mi), by road, east of Kampala, Uganda's capital and largest city. This location is adjacent to Jinja Airport, the civilian and military airport that serves the city of Jinja. The coordinates of Kimaka are 0°27'09.0"N, 33°11'55.0"E (Latitude:0.452490; Longitude:33.198600).

== History ==
The college was established in 2003. The first commandant was Major General Benon Biraaro. The first group of students was admitted in 2004 to attend the senior command course that lasted one year. The first officers to graduate from the college included some of the most senior leaders of the UPDF. The course has been given every year since and has been attended by the majority of the senior commanders in the UPDF. As of June 2020, the commandant of USCSC was Lieutenant General Andrew Gutti.

== Courses ==
The most popular and widely attended course is the senior command course, conducted annually. The course is attended by senior officers from the UPDF and by senior military officers from other African countries including Kenya, Tanzania, South Sudan and Rwanda. Other courses, including strategic courses in peacekeeping, have been in the planning stages.

In 2018, the college graduated the first class of military officers who had undergone a year's education, graduating with a Master of Arts degree in Defence and Security.

== Alumni ==
The graduates of the USCSC include, but are not limited to, the following:

- Elly Tumwine - Former Commander of the UPDF
- Salim Saleh - Former Commander of the UPDF
- David Sejusa - Former Director of National Intelligence, Uganda
- Elly Kayanja - Former Deputy Director of National Intelligence, Uganda
- Nobel Mayombo - Former Permanent Secretary, Uganda Ministry of Defense
- Julius Oketta - Member of Parliament, Director of National Emergency Coordination and Operations. Member of Advisory Group of United Nations Central Emergency Response Fund
- Peter Kerim - Deputy Director of the External Security Organization
- Shaban Bantariza - Former Deputy Executive Director, Uganda Media Centre
- Sabiiti Muzeyi - Former Deputy Inspector General of Police, former Commander of the UPDF Military Police.
- Charity Bainababo - Former Deputy Commander of Special Forces Command.

== Photos ==
- USCSC Class of 2009

== See also ==
- National Resistance Army
- Uganda Military Academy
- List of military schools in Uganda
- List of Universities in Uganda
- Ivan Koreta
