= Ivan Koreta =

Ugandan general

General Ivan Koreta
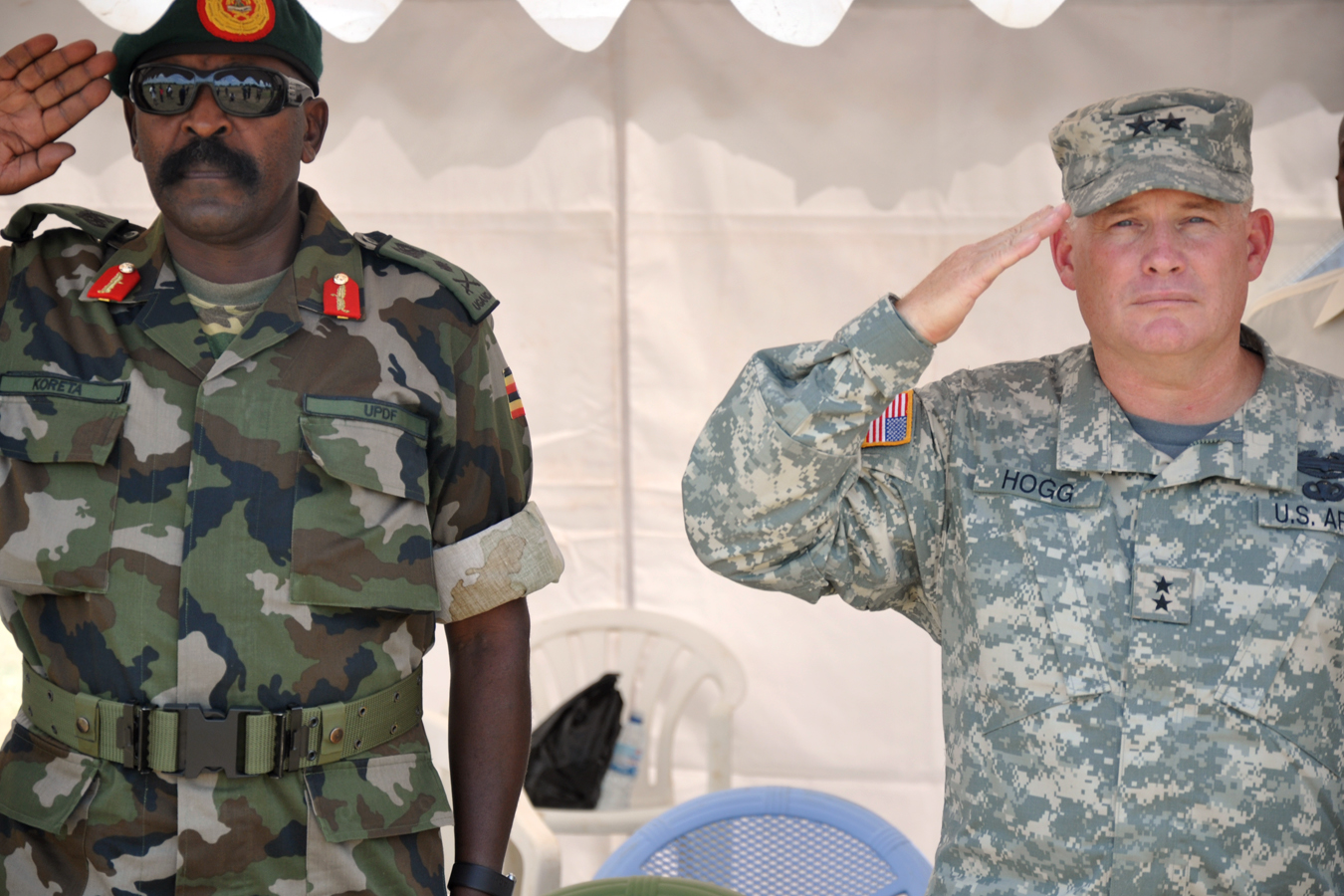
- Koreta (left)
- Born: 15 October 1955 (age 70); Mbarara, British Uganda
- Citizenship: Uganda
- Education: Kiira College Butiki (East African Certificate of Education); Old Kampala Secondary School (East African Advanced Certificate of Education); Uganda Junior Staff College (Senior Non-Commissioned Officers Course); Makambako Administration Officers College, Tanzania (Battalion Administrative Officer Course); University of Ibadan (MSc Strategic Studies)
- Occupation: Military officer
- Years active: Since 1977

Ivan Koreta (born 15 October 1955) is a Ugandan retired military officer, diplomat and legislator. He is a retired general in the Uganda People's Defence Forces (UPDF) and a former representative for the armed forces in the Parliament of Uganda, where he served as a member of the Public Accounts Committee and the Committee on Presidential Affairs.

Koreta has been a member of the armed forces since 1981. He most recently served as the deputy chief of defence forces, the second-highest position in the UPDF, from 2005 to 2013. He also served from 2006 until 2009 as the chairman of the General Court Martial, the second-highest military court in Uganda.

== Early life and education ==
Koreta was born in Mbarara, Ankole sub-region, on 15 October 1955 in a Pentecostal family of the Banyankole. He had his primary education at Nyamitanga Muslim Primary School, in his home town of Mbarara and attained his PLE certification in 1969. He then attended Kiira College Butiki for his O-Level education, attaining an East African Certificate of Education in 1973. He then transferred to Old Kampala Secondary School, for his A-Level schooling, graduating with the East African Advanced Certificate of Education in 1975. He is a member of the Pentecostal Church in Uganda.

== Military training and career ==
While still in his teens, Koreta attended military training in Mozambique as a member of the Front for National Salvation, a guerilla group led by Yoweri Museveni. He participated in the war that removed Idi Amin from power in 1979. When Museveni formed the National Resistance Army (NRA) in 1981, Koreta joined him. During the Ugandan Bush War, he became a battalion commander in the NRA. During the April 1986 battle to capture the Ugandan capital city Kampala, his 13th NRA Battalion was responsible for guarding the Kampala-Gulu highway at Matugga.

Since the NRA captured power and was subsequently transformed into the UPDF, Koreta has served in various roles, including the following:

- Commander of the First Division: 1986-1988 (at the rank of brigadier general)
- Deputy director of the Internal Security Organization: 1988–2001
- Promoted to rank of major general: 2001
- Promoted to rank of lieutenant general and appointed commandant of the Uganda Senior Command and Staff College at Kimaka, being the first military officer to serve in that capacity: 2004
- Appointed deputy commander of defence forces in Uganda: 2005
- Appointed chairman of the General Court Martial: 2006
- Appointed head of the Ugandan delegation on the Ceasefire and Transitional Security Arrangement Monitoring Mechanism (CTSAMM) team for South Sudan: 2015

== Other responsibilities ==
As a diplomat, Koreta led a Ugandan peace-keeping force to Liberia in 1994. In 2016, he was elected as a representative for the UPDF in the 10th Parliament of Uganda, where he served as a member of the Public Accounts Committee and the Committee on Presidential Affairs.

In February 2019 he was promoted from lieutenant general to four-star general, in a promotions exercise involving over 2,000 men and women of the UPDF.

== Retirement ==
In August 2021, he retired from the UPDF, as a four-star general, at age 65.

== See also ==
- UPDF
- Parliament of Uganda
