= Henry Tumukunde =

Ugandan politician and retired general (born 1959)

Lieutenant General Henry Tumukunde
- Born: 28 February 1959 (age 67); Rukungiri, British Protectorate of Uganda
- Citizenship: Uganda
- Education: Makerere University (LL.B.); Law Development Centre (Diploma in Legal Practice); Graduate Institute of Geneva (Executive Masters in Oil and Gas Management); Armed Forces Command and Staff College, Jaji (Senior Command Course)
- Occupations: Military Officer; Politician; Lawyer
- Years active: 1981 to present

Henry Tumukunde is a politician and retired senior military officer of the Uganda People's Defence Forces (UPDF). He ran as an independent candidate for president in the 2021 Ugandan general election.He currently serves as Member of Parliament for Rukungiri Municipality and the Minister of Gender, Labour and Social Development in the Ugandan Cabinet

He was the Minister of National Security in the Cabinet of Uganda, appointed to that position on 6 June 2016. On 4 March 2018, he was relieved of his duties in an unexpected cabinet reshuffle.

He is also an advocate of the High Court of Uganda. He has served as the Uganda Peoples Defence Forces (UPDF) Director of Planning, Chief of Personnel and Administration, Chief of Military Intelligence as well as serving as the commanding officer of the UPDF Fourth Division, based in Gulu in the Northern Region of Uganda. He has also previously served as the director general of the Internal Security Organisation (ISO). Tumukunde was also a Member of Parliament representing the Army in the Parliament of Uganda between 1995 and 2005.He currently serves as Member of Parliament for Rukungiri Municipality and the Minister of Gender, Labour and Social Development in the Ugandan Cabinet

== Early life and education ==
He was born on 28 February 1959 in Rukungiri District in the Western Region of Uganda. He attended Bishop Stuart College Demonstration School in Mbarara for his primary education and Kigezi College Butobere (Siniya) and Kibuli Secondary School for his O-Level and A-Level education, respectively. Tumukunde graduated from Makerere University with a Bachelor of Laws degree in 1981. He obtained a Diploma in Legal Practice awarded by the Law Development Centre in 2010. He also holds an Executive Masters in Oil and Gas Management, awarded by the Graduate Institute of International and Development Studies of Geneva in 2013.

== Joining the NRA Guerrillas ==
During his time at Makerere University, Tumukunde was involved in anti-government politics, which subsequently led to his joining of then rebels, the National Resistance Army, led by current Ugandan President Yoweri Museveni. Tumukunde was hounded by the government security services during his last year at the university and, on completion of his education, decided to join the Ugandan Bush War, along with two of his friends at the time, Major General Mugisha Muntu and Colonel Jet Mwebaze.

Obote's security services at the time caught wind of their impending departure for the bush and mounted an attack on the NRA's transit house, a shop in the country's capital city, Kampala. It is said that Tumukunde alongside Muntu posed as shopkeepers, surviving what would have been sure torture and death. In the early stages of the war, Tumukunde was a machine gunner and eventually went on to become one of the senior officers in the rebel army, indicated by his senior number RA 0111.

In 1984, during one of the bigger battles with the then Uganda army in Luweero District, Tumukunde was shot multiple times in his legs. The wounds were so serious that it was thought he would not survive. He was, however, smuggled out of the country to Nairobi and eventually to London, where he was operated on.

== Presidential aspirations ==
On 3 March 2020, Tumukunde declared that he will be challenging Yoweri Kaguta Museveni for the seat of presidency in 2021. In a press briefing, Tumukunde attributed his decision to the fact that the NRM party and Yoweri Kaguta Museveni were not ready to discuss a peaceful transition of power. On 7 June 2020, following the 2020 Malawian presidential election, Tumukunde called for all opposition parties in Uganda to unite behind a single presidential candidate in 2021. He ran as an independent candidate for president in the 2021 Ugandan general election.

== Postwar career ==
On capturing power, Tumukunde was promoted to the rank of major and appointed first secretary and military attache at the Ugandan Embassy in the United Kingdom. Subsequently, Tumukunde was sent on a Senior Command and Staff Course at the Armed Forces Command and Staff College, Jaji, in Kaduna, Nigeria, from where he emerged as one of the best students. On his return to Uganda he was appointed as the army's director of planning. Tumukunde served in this role for many years and was very instrumental in the setup of formal military structures in the UPDF, which had until then been a rebel army.

In 1994, Uganda held elections for the Constituent Assembly and Tumukunde sought to represent his home county, Rubabo in Rukungiri district. His main competitor was a government minister and senior figure Mondo Kagonyera. Tumukunde, who was in early thirties at the time, was thought to be the underdog in the race; however, Tumukunde was a very good mobiliser and won by a landslide margin. Tumukunde then joined the CA, which formulated the current 1995 Ugandan Constitution. Tumukunde was known to be a regular and astute contributor to the sessions and debates that preceded the formation of the Constitution.

Following the adoption of the constitution, Uganda held elections and Tumukunde subsequently became a Member of Parliament representing the Army as a special interest group. He went on to serve as an MP until 2005. In addition to this, Tumukunde was promoted to the rank of lieutenant colonel and appointed Chief of Personnel and Administration. He is credited with having introduced the promotional exams system (PROMEX) for officers in the army which remains in use to date.

In 1998, Tumukunde was again promoted to the rank of colonel and appointed chief of military intelligence and security. His tenure was arguably the most successful by any officer as it is during this time that Al-Qaeda's plan to bomb the American embassy in Kampala was thwarted. It was also a time when bombings were rampant within the capital Kampala, and once again Tumukunde formed several intelligence committees within the city and the problem was managed. Tumukunde also built an amicable rapport with the Muslim community, which many had accused of spearheading the attacks, so much so that key intelligence information was forwarded to him with ease. Arguably, it was during his term that the Ugandan intelligence apparatus was at its most efficient.

Tumukunde was then promoted to the rank of brigadier general and transferred to command the UPDF Fourth Division based in Gulu. At the time, the war with the LRA was ongoing and Tumukunde made significant headway during his time as Division Commanding Officer in diminishing the threat of the Lords Resistance Army. He later played a role in initiating the peace negotiations process with the rebels and also directed the army's efforts in containing the Ebola virus epidemic which had hit the Northern Uganda region at the time.

In 2000, Tumukunde was appointed as the director general of the Internal Security Organisation, Uganda's domestic intelligence agency. During his time at ISO, Tumukunde set up structures that returned the agency to being the country's foremost intelligence gathering body, just as he had done with CMI. The Internal Security Organisation became renowned for its efficient and effective approach towards intelligence and counter-terrorism.

== The fallout ==
Tumukunde's rise to the upper echelons due to his dedication to Uganda brought him into the sights of the very institutions he helped to consolidate.

At a political retreat in 2003, Tumukunde, in the presence of the President and his cabinet, argued against the impending removal of term limits that would give President Museveni the right to stand for re-election on an infinite basis. Tumukunde stated that this would be in direct contravention of the rights that they had fought to establish and that he was not willing to take part in what he considered to be grossly unconstitutional behaviour. Predictably, this put him at loggerheads with the establishment and more so the president.

== Arrests and detentions ==
Tumukunde was charged with the offences of ‘abuse of office’ and ‘spreading harmful propaganda’. The abuse of office charges were eventually dropped in a manner suggesting that they had been politically motivated in the first instance. What followed was, however, a surprise to many. Tumukunde was on 28 May 2005 forced to resign from Parliament and subsequently arrested on the orders of the president.

His home was surrounded by at least 50 soldiers commanded by generals Kale Kayihura and Joshua Masaba who arrested him. Tumukunde was taken to an officers' mess turned detention center, where he was incarcerated for nearly two years, during which time he had limited and tightly controlled contact with the outside world. His extrajudicial detention coupled with a series of controversial and uncertain court martial hearings seemed to backfire leading to pressure culminating in his release in 2007. His arrest followed his opposing views to the proposed "kisanja" project that suggested a revision to the Constitution of Uganda enabling one to serve an unlimited number of terms as president, removing the two-term maximum limit.

On 18 April 2013, the UPDF General Court Martial sat to bring an end to the process that had lasted eight years and summed up its deliberations. The charge of spreading harmful propaganda was dropped while the joint charge of military misconduct was upheld and Tumukunde was subsequently sentenced to a severe reprimand.

=== Post-presidential bid declaration arrest ===
On 12 March 2020, less than two weeks after announcing his presidential bid, General Tumukunde was arrested at his office in Kampala on allegations of treason.

On 19 November 2020, Tumukunde suspended his presidential campaign in response to the arrest of fellow opposition candidate Bobi Wine. Two days later, Tumukunde and Wine, along with fellow opposition presidential candidates Mugisha Muntu, Norbert Mao, and Patrick Amuriat Oboi, agreed to form an alliance.

== Promotion and retirement ==
On 1 September 2015, the Daily Monitor reported that Tumukunde had been promoted to the rank of lieutenant general and then retired with full honours from the Army after thirty four years of service. He effectively skipped the rank of major general.

== Appointment to Cabinet ==
On 6 June 2016, he was appointed to the Cabinet as the Minister of National Security. He was relieved of his cabinet responsibilities on the evening of Sunday, 4 March 2018, in a presidential tweet, in which General Kale Kayihura, the inspector general of police, was also fired.

== See also ==
- Uganda People's Defence Force
- Parliament of Uganda
- Rukungiri District
- Cabinet of Uganda
