= Jinja, Uganda =

City in Eastern Region, Uganda

Jinja Idindha (Soga)
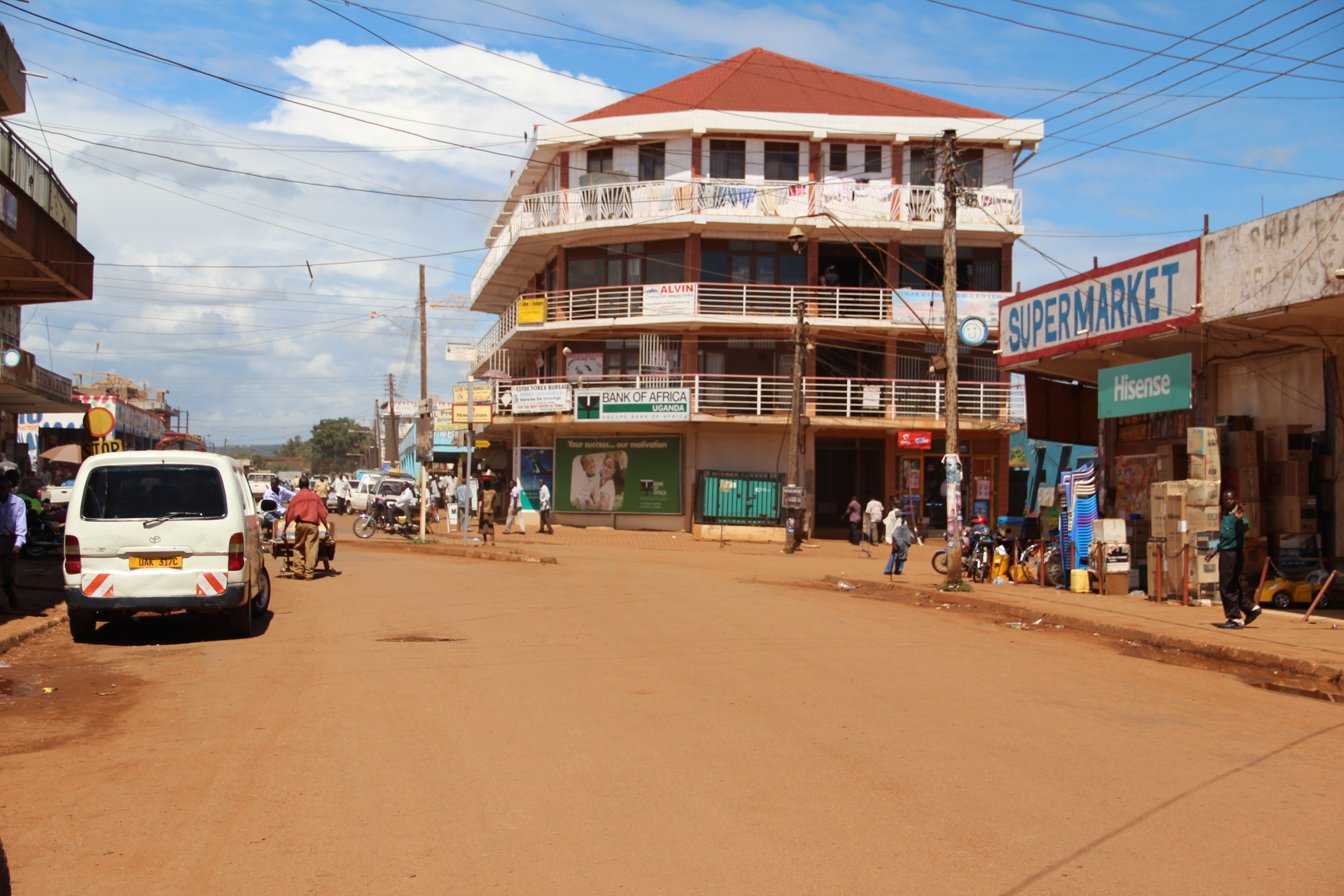

- Location in Uganda
- Coordinates: 00°25′24″N 33°12′14″E
- Country: Uganda
- Region: Eastern Region
- Sub-region: Busoga
- District: Jinja
- Established: 1906

Government
  - Mayor: (Kasolo Alton)
- Elevation: 1,204 m (3,950 ft)

Population (2020 Estimate)
  - Total: 300,000

Jinja is a city in the Eastern Region of Uganda, located on the north shore of Lake Victoria near the source of the Nile River.

== Location ==
Jinja is in Jinja District, Busoga sub-region, in the Eastern Region of Uganda. It is approximately 81 kilometres (50 mi) east of Kampala.

It sits on the northern shore of Lake Victoria, near the source of the White Nile, at an average elevation of 1,204 metres (3,950 ft) above sea level.

== History ==
The city was founded in 1901 by British settlers. It was planned under colonial rule in 1948 by Ernst May, German architect and urban planner. May also designed the urban planning scheme for Kampala, creating what he called "neighbourhood units". Estates were built for the ruling elite in many parts outside the centre city. This led to the area's 'slum clearance' which displaced more than 1,000 residents in the 1950s.

In 1954, the construction of the Owen Falls Dam submerged the Ripon Falls. Most of the "Flat Rocks" that gave the area its name disappeared under water as well. Both the Baganda on the western side and the Busoga on the eastern side of the Nile called the area "the stones" which is "ejjinja" in both languages. The name "Jinja" derives from this. A description of what the area looked like can be found in the notes of John Hanning Speke, the first European to lay eyes on the source of the Nile:

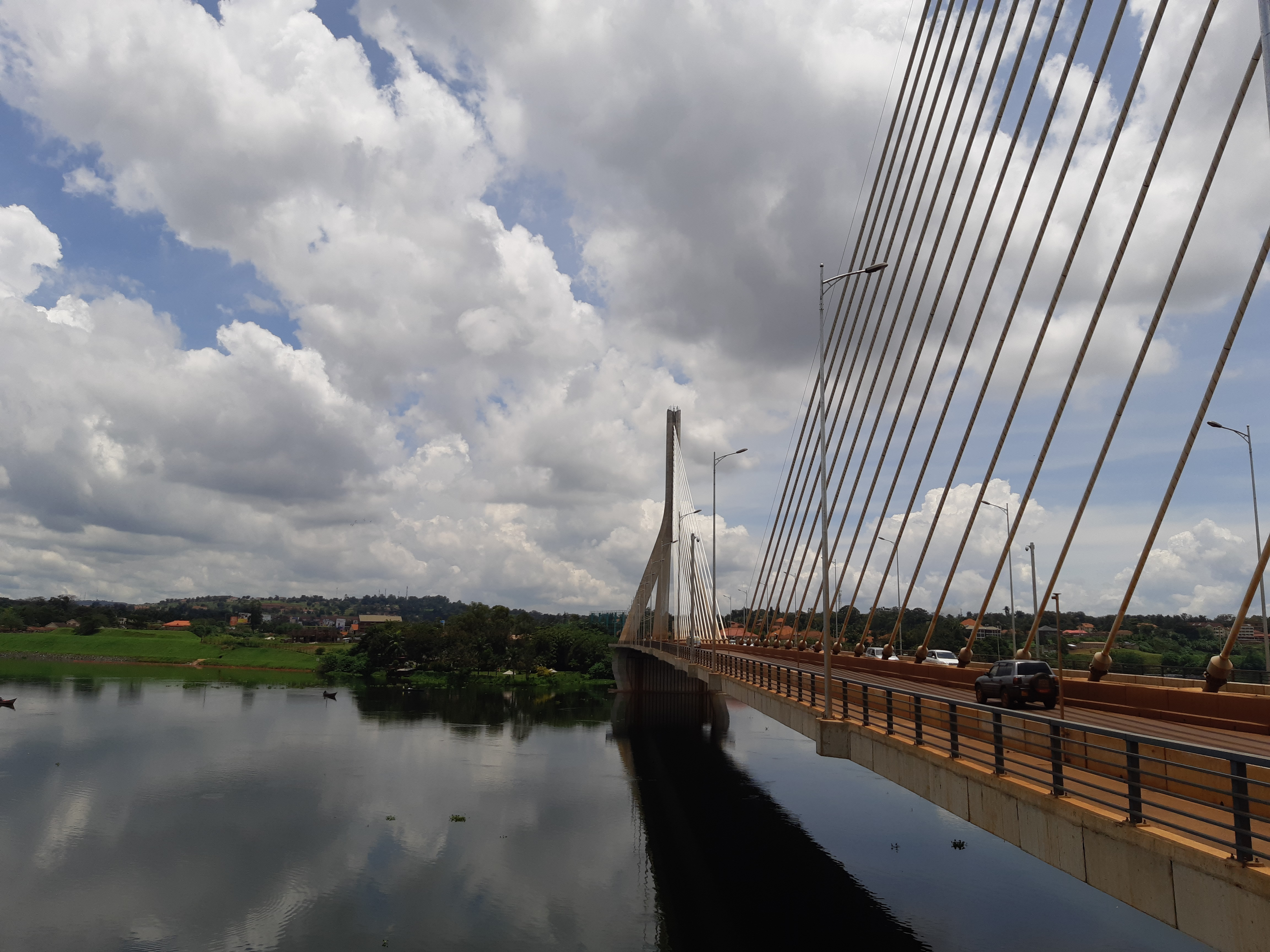
Source of the Nile Bridge, Jinja

Though beautiful, the scene was not exactly what I expected, for the broad surface of the lake was shut out from view by a spur of hill, and the falls, about twelve feet deep and four to five hundred feet broad, were broken by rocks; still it was a sight that attracted one to it for hours. The roar of the waters, the thousands of passenger fish leaping at the falls with all their might, the fishermen coming out in boats, and taking post on all the rocks with rod and hook, hippopotami and crocodiles lying sleepily on the water, the ferry at work above the falls, and cattle driven down to drink at the margin of the lake, made in all, with the pretty nature of the country—small grassy-topped hills, with trees in the intervening valleys and on the lower slopes—as interesting a picture as one could wish to see."

Jinja was one of the Ugandan cities affected by the Uganda–Tanzania War of 1978–1979. After the Fall of Kampala to the coalition of the Tanzania People's Defence Force (TPDF) and the Uganda National Liberation Army (UNLA), Ugandan President Idi Amin initially fled to Jinja, where he attempted to regroup the remnants of the Uganda Army (UA). According to journalist Nelson Bwire Kapo, Amin even proclaimed Jinja the new capital of Uganda, though he soon retreated to Arua, and from there went into exile.

Elements of the local Uganda Army garrison, notably the Eagle Colonel Gaddafi Battalion, remained in the city, reportedly engaging in drunken behavior, harassment, and killings of civilians. However, most soldiers eventually deserted and left Jinja. On 22 April 1979, the TPDF and their UNLA allies assaulted Jinja, occupying the city after encountering little resistance. The remaining UA troops mostly fled, and Jinja's civilian residents greeted the TPDF-UNLA force with cheers. The operation was accompanied by some looting in the city. Following the end of hostilities, Tanzanian officers reportedly used Jinja as a hub to transport stolen goods from Uganda to Mwanza, including cars, tons of coffee, large amounts of gasoline, and war materiel.

In October 1987, the Holy Spirit Movement attacked the Magamaga barracks near Jinja. The rebels were repulsed by the local National Resistance Army garrison.

== Demographics ==
The national census of 2002 estimated Jinja's population to be 71,213 of which 36,325 were males and 34,888 were females. In 2010, the Uganda Bureau of Statistics (UBOS) estimated the population at 82,800. In 2011, UBOS estimated the population at 89,700. In 2014, the national population census put the population at 72,931 However, the Municipality Authority contested the recent census of 2014, saying it under-counted Jinja's population. According to the 2014 national population census data, Jinja is the largest metropolitan area in the Jinja District and the 14th-largest metropolis in the country. According to Uganda Bureau of Statistics (UBOS) the estimated the population was 247074 for 2014, and the Uganda Bureau of Statistics (UBOS) estimated a population of 279184 in 2024.

The majority of the population are of Bantu origin. Lusoga is the main local language. Jinja has a large population of inhabitants who are defined as "working urban poor". The average annual household income is estimated at US $100.

== Economy ==
Jinja has the second largest economy in Uganda. In the past, factories chose Jinja as their base because of the nearby electric power station at the Owen Falls Dam. Since the early 2000s, the economy of Jinja has picked up steadily. The main economic activities take place in the central business district.

A new market for fresh produce was completed during the fourth quarter of 2014. The facility can accommodate up to 4,500 vendors and cost US$13.7 million to construct, with a loan from the African Development Bank from 2011 until 2014.

The biggest local employer is the Kakira Sugar Works (KSW), a member of the Madhvani Group of companies. KSW is one of the largest sugar factories in East Africa, employing over 7,500. The factory burns bagasse byproducts from sugar manufacturing to generate 50 megawatts of electricity for internal use and sale to the national grid. Sugar cane cutting median wages are about UGX:1,000 per day.

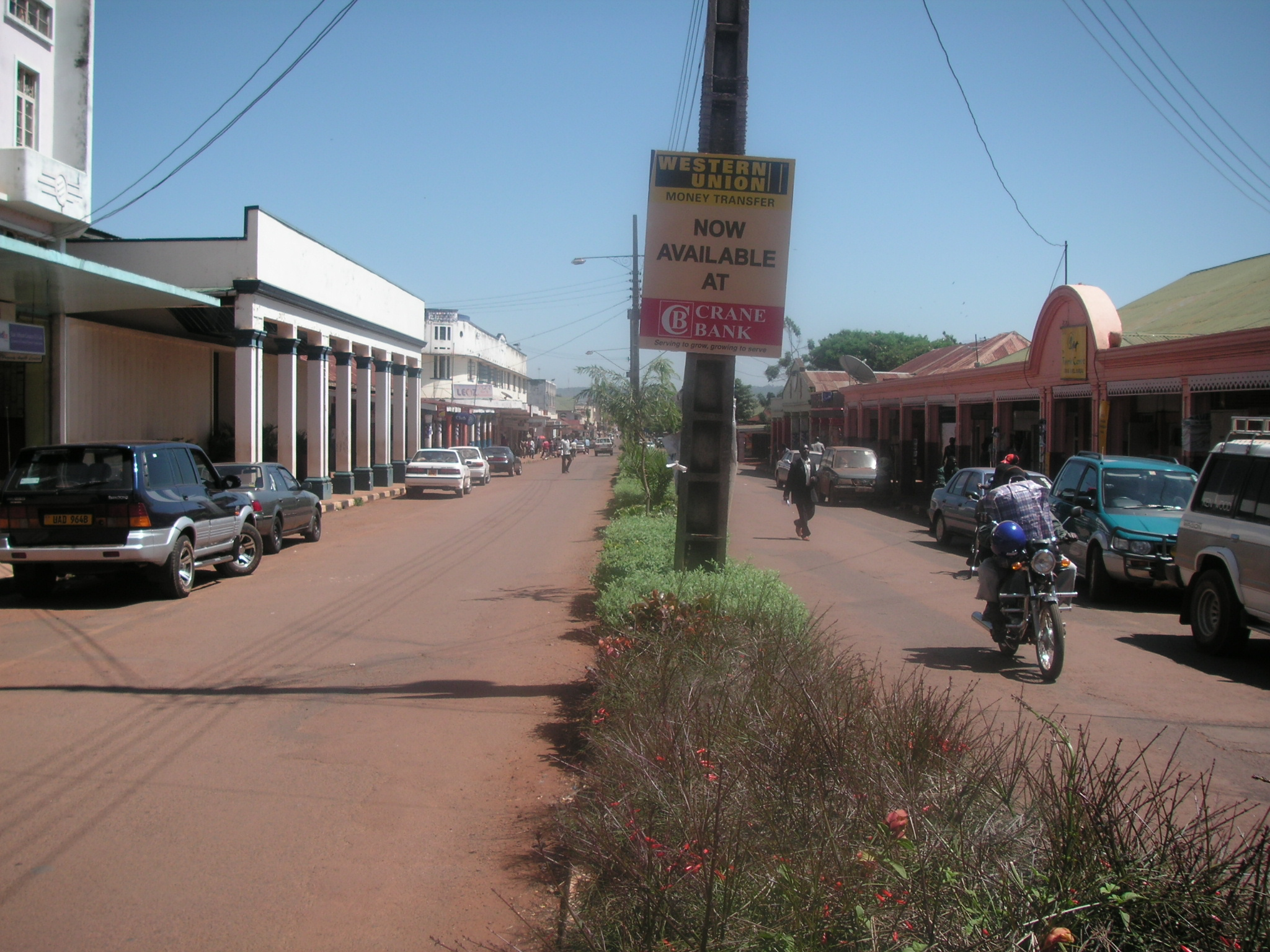
Jinja Town

The headquarters of Nile Breweries Limited are in Njeru, in Buyikwe district in central Uganda, near the Source of the Nile, from which the brewery has been drawing its water since 1956. Building of the brewery commenced in 1952 and was completed four years later. Bottles of Nile Beer, renamed Nile Special Lager, the company's flagship brand, were first consumed in 1956. In 2001, Nile Breweries Limited was fully acquired by South African Breweries.

MM Integrated Steel Uganda Limited is one of the leading manufacturers of steel in the region. It has completed a $47 million (Shs122 billion) plant to produce 50,000 tonnes of steel products a year and directly employs 1,800 people. The company has projected to invest US$600 million through 2018.

Bidco International Oil Refining Company maintains a palm oil factory in the city. The palm oil fruits come from Bidco's 6,500 hectares (16,000 acres) plantation on Bugala Island in the Ssese Islands Archipelago, Kalangala District, in Lake Victoria. The factory in the islands crushes the fruit, and the crude palm oil is transported to Jinja for refining into edible oil and other products.

Kiira Motors Corporation, also known as the Kiira EV Project, a locally based startup car company, expects to set up the first car manufacturing facility in Uganda, based in Jinja. The Kiira EV Project received 40 hectares (100 acres) of land at the Jinja Industrial and Business Park. Production is expected to start in 2018. The government of Uganda will provide funding to the initial production and setting up of a factory for the project.

Jinja city's strategic location at the source of River Nile with numerous power generating plants makes it ideal for industrialisation.

== Education ==
The city also has several educational establishments including the following:

=== Universities and colleges ===
- Eastern Campus of Makerere University
- Jinja Campus of the Makerere University Business School
- Jinja Campus of Busoga University
- Jinja Campus of Kampala University
- Nsaka University
- National Forensic Sciences University, Uganda

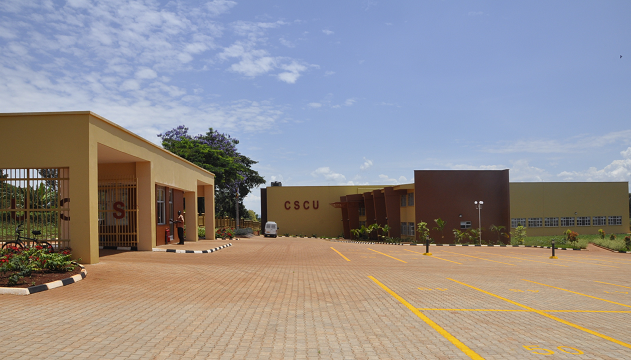
Civil Service College Uganda

=== Military colleges ===
- Uganda Senior Command and Staff College
- Uganda Junior Staff College
- National Defence College, Uganda

=== Secondary schools ===
- Busoga College
- Jinja College
- Wanyange Girls Secondary School
- Kiira College Butiki

=== Other ===
- The Queen of Apostles Philosophy Centre in Jinja provides philosophical education and basic formation for candidates wishing to join the Mill Hill Missionary Society.

== Defence ==
The Qaddafi Barracks, an institution of the Uganda People's Defence Force (UPDF), are in Jinja. They are the location of the Uganda Junior Staff College, one of the about a dozen military schools in Uganda. The town is also the site of the Uganda Senior Command and Staff College, another UPDF institution, located in the Kimaka neighbourhood about 3 miles (5 km) north of Jinja's central business district.

== Electricity generation ==
In 1993, construction began on a second power station at the source of the White Nile; an extension of the original Nalubaale Power Station. The extension was completed in 2003, named the Kiira Power Station, and is capable of producing 200 megawatts of hydroelectric power at maximum utilization.

== Transport ==
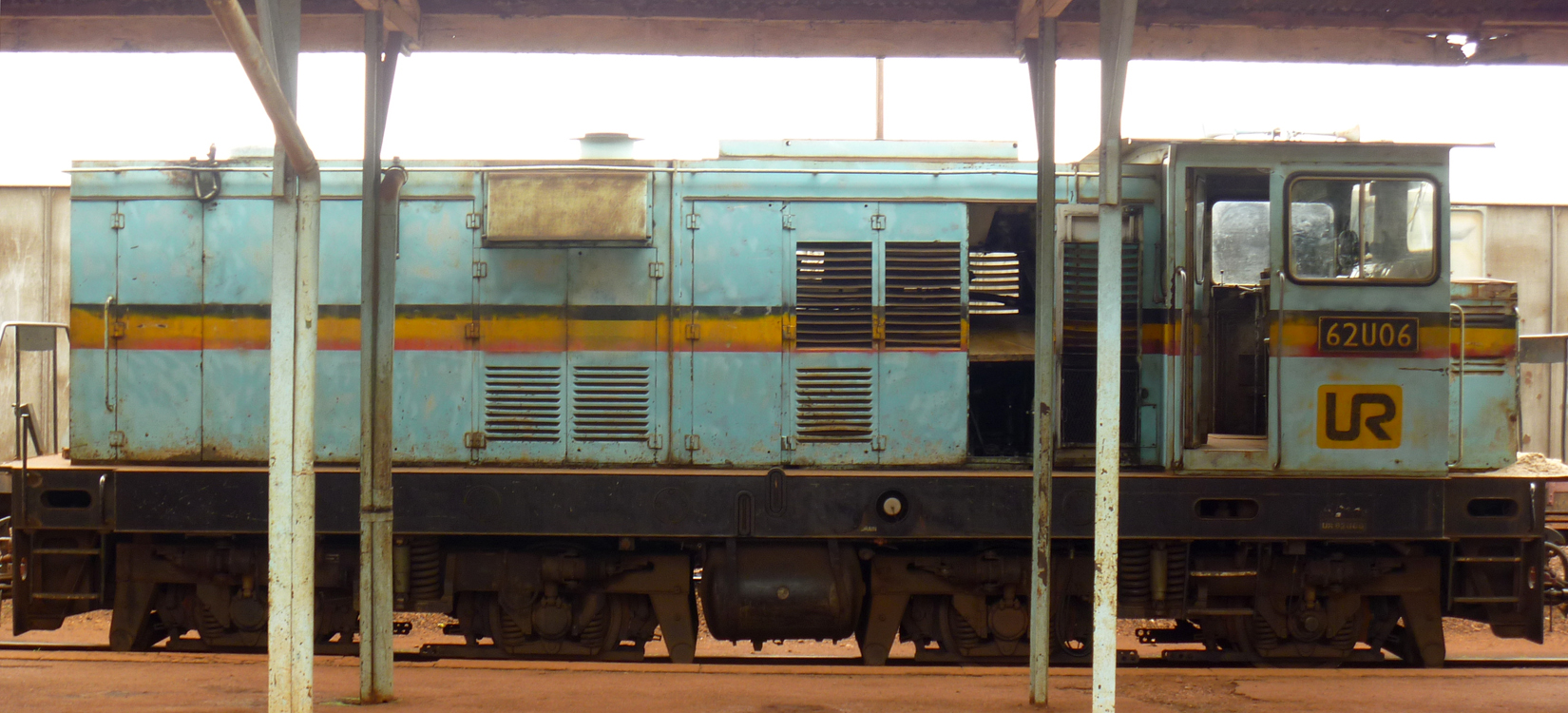
Jinja station with a Uganda Railways diesel locomotive.

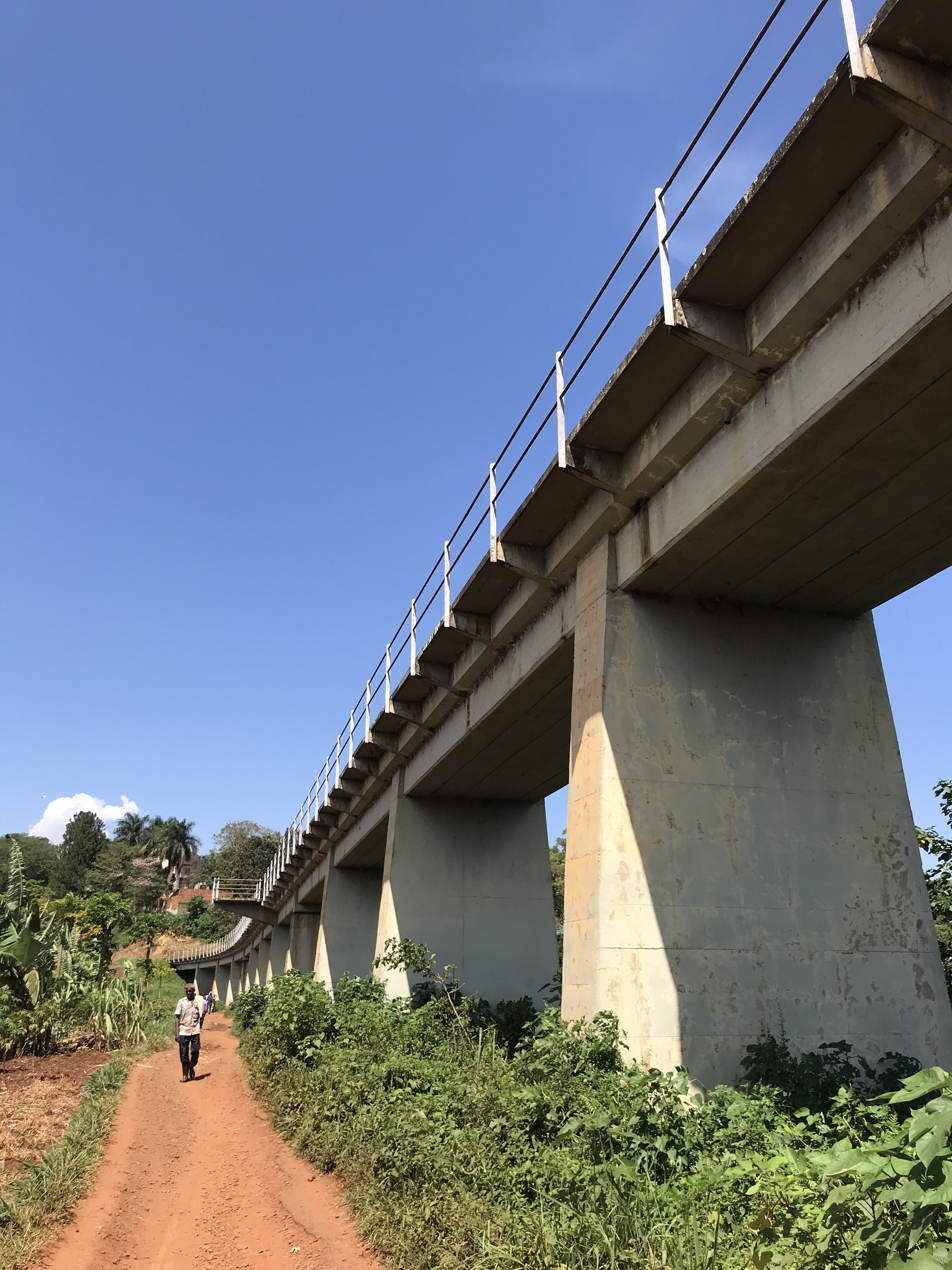
Man walking below the train bridge

Jinja is a major station on the Uganda Railway and is a port for Lake Victoria ferries.

Jinja Airport, a small civilian and military airport, is located at Kimaka, about 4 kilometres (2.5 mi) north of Jinja's central business district.

A bridge, known as the Source of the Nile Bridge, was built across the Nile, connecting the town of Njeru to Jinja. Construction started in 2013 and the completed structure was commissioned on 17 October 2018.

The Kampala–Jinja Highway connects Jinja with the capital.

== Local attractions ==
Local attractions include white-water rafting, the source of the Nile River, and bungee jumping. About 5 miles (8.0 km) north of Jinja is the Bujagali Power Station. The hydroelectric facility is providing 250 megawatts of electric power.

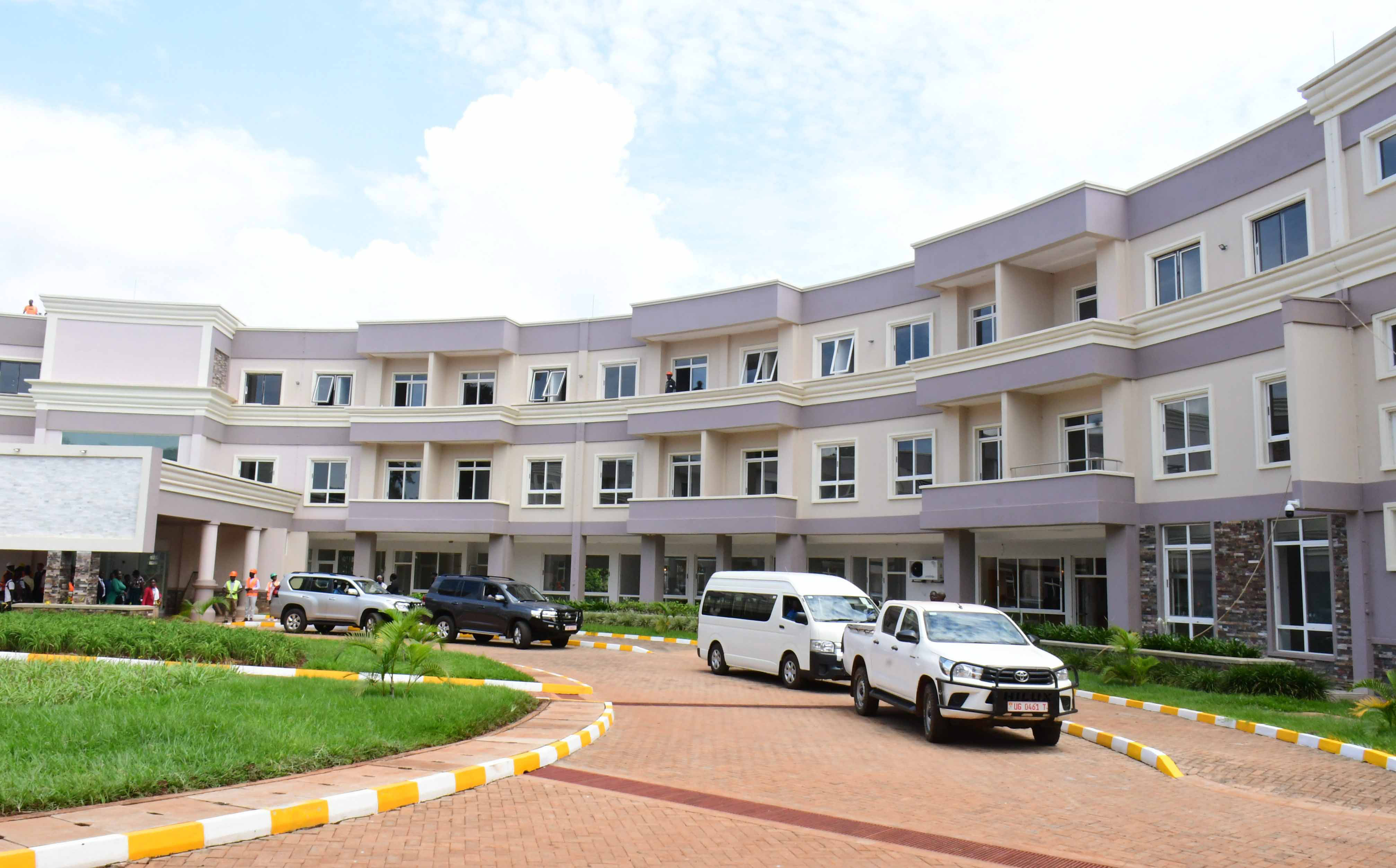
The Uganda Hotel and Tourism Training Institute (UHTTI) hotel projects in Jinja City.jpg

Since 2015, the city has hosted the Nyege Nyege Festival, at Discovery Beach in the suburb of Njeru in Buyikwe district approximately 20 minutes from the Jinja Central Business District.

== Places of worship ==
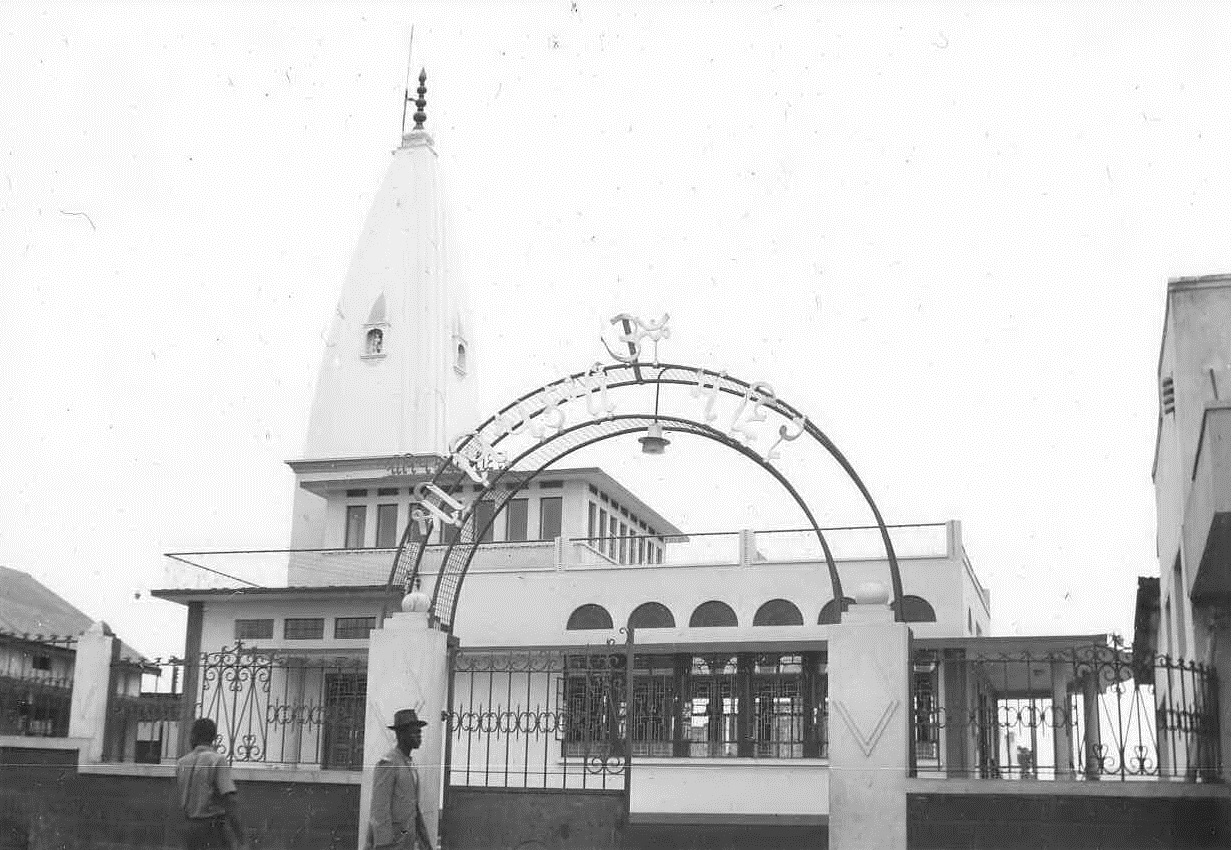
Vishvakarma (Hinduism) Temple in Jinja.

Among the places of worship, they are predominantly Christian churches and temples : Roman Catholic Diocese of Jinja (Catholic Church), Church of Uganda (Anglican Communion), Presbyterian Church in Uganda (World Communion of Reformed Churches), Baptist Union of Uganda (Baptist World Alliance), Assemblies of God. There are also Muslim mosques.

== Sport ==
Jinja has two major football teams Bul FC and Gaddafi FC, both of whom play in the Ugandan Super League.

== Notable people ==
- Mayur Madhvani (born 1949), businessman
- Tarique Ghaffur (born 1958), police officer
- Irene Mulyagonja (born 1963), lawyer and judge
- Saba Saba (born 1977), hip hop artist
- Zari Hassan (born 1980), socialite, musician and businesswoman
- Kenneth Waiswa (born 1998), cricketer
- Robinson Obuya (born 2000), cricketer

== Geographic data ==
Jinja hosts the regional offices of the Uganda Red Cross Society, a humanitarian organization.

== City status ==
On 1 July 2020, the government of Uganda awarded city status to several municipalities, including Jinja. As part of the qualifications to become a city, Jinja expanded to include the former Jinja Municipality, Bugembe Town Council, Mafubira sub-county and Budondo sub-county. The estimated population of the new city, as of October 2020, is about 300,000.

In October 2020, the city mayor, Titus Kisambira, signed a memorandum of understanding, as an initial step in the establishment of sister cityhood with the city of Shenyang, in Liaoning Province, in China.

== Administration ==
Jinja is made up of several administrative structures for effective administration and management of the city. It has two Divisions that's to say Jinja North Division and Jinja South Division. The divisions are further also divided into small administrative units which include the following as follow.

Jinja North Division: The sub-county under jinja north division include the follow as listed below with their respective parishes. Jinja north division subcounty has over 15 parishes.

- Budhumbuli East Ward
- Budhumbuli West Ward
- Buwagi Ward
- Buwekula Ward
- Buwenda TC Ward
- Ivunamba Ward
- Katende Ward
- Kibibi Ward
- Mafubira Ward
- Nakanyonyi Ward
- Namizi Ward
- Nawangoma Ward
- Wanyama ward
- Wanyange Ward

Jinja South Division: The sub counties of Jinja South division include the following as listed below with their respective parishes. Jinja South division has around 11 parishes.

- Central Jinja East Ward
- Central Jinja West Ward
- Lubaga Ward
- Kimaka ward
- Maggwa ward
- Masese Ward
- Mpumu Ward
- Nalufenya Ward
- Mpumudde Ward
- Old Boma Ward
- Walukuba east Ward
- Walukuba West Ward

== See also ==
- Jinja Hospital
- Jinja Airport
- Kiira Power Station
- List of birds in Jinja
- Nalubaale Power Station
- Bujagali Power Station
- Madhvani Group
- Njeru
- List of cities and towns in Uganda
- Districts of Uganda
- Busoga sub-region
- Busoga
- Eastern Region, Uganda
- Parliament of Uganda

== Notes ==
1. Great African Travellers, From Mungo Park to Livingstone and Stanley, The Project Gutenberg EBook of Great African Travellers, by W.H.G. Kingston (2007) (https://www.gutenberg.org/files/21391/21391-h/21391-h.htm).

== Bibliography ==
- Avirgan, Tony; Honey, Martha (1983). War in Uganda: The Legacy of Idi Amin. Dar es Salaam: Tanzania Publishing House. ISBN 978-9976-1-0056-3.
- Cooper, Tom; Fontanellaz, Adrien (2015). Wars and Insurgencies of Uganda 1971–1994. Solihull: Helion & Company Limited. ISBN 978-1-910294-55-0.
