= Kimaka =

- Map of Uganda showing the location of Kimaka.
- Coordinates: 00°27′01″N 33°11′30″E
- Country: Uganda
- Region: Eastern Uganda
- Sub-region: Busoga sub-region
- District: Jinja District
- Elevation: 1,190 m (3,900 ft)
- Time zone: UTC+3 (EAT)

Kimaka is a neighborhood in the city of Jinja, in the Eastern Region of Uganda.

== Location ==
Kimaka is bordered by to the west by the Nile River, (from Nalubaale Power Station to Bujagali Power Station), to the south by the Kampala-Jinja Highway (from Nalubaale Power Station to the first roundabout as one enters Jinja from Kampala), to the east by Qaddafi Barracks and to the north by the area north of the Jinja Airport. This location is about 3.6 kilometres (2.2 mi) from the central business district of Jinja. The coordinates of Kimaka are: 0°27'01.0"N, 33°11'30.0"E (Latitude: 0.450278; Longitude: 33.191667).

== Overview ==
Kimaka is divided into 111 districts across four regional zones, the Northern Region, Central Region, Eastern Region, and Western region. The Eastern Zone, east of the Jinja-Budondo Road, and the Western Zone, to the west of that road. The Eastern Zone is dominated by Jinja Airport and the Uganda Senior Command and Staff College. The Western Zone is primarily composed of middle class residential neighborhoods and, closer to the River Nile, by the three hydroelectric dams from south to north: Nalubaale, Kiira, and Bujagali. Kimaka Power Station, a 50 MW thermal power plant that uses heavy fuel oil, is located adjacent to Kiira Power Station.

== Landmarks ==
The landmarks in Kimaka or near its borders include:

- Jinja Airport, a military and civilian airport that serves Jinja
- Uganda Senior Command and Staff College, located adjacent to the airport
- Nalubaale Power Station located at the southwestern border of Kimaka
- Kiira Power Station located at the southwestern border of Kimaka, adjacent to Nalubaale Power Station
- Bujagali Power Station located approximately 5 kilometres (3.1 mi), downstream of Nalubaale Power Station.
- Victoria Nile - Forms the western border of Kimaka
- The Jinja-Budondo Road - Bisects Kimaka into the Eastern and Western Zones
- Kimaka Power Station - A thermal power station operated by Invespro, a private power company
- The Kampala-Jinja Highway - The highway forms the southern border of the neighbourhood

== See also ==
- Jinja District
- Njeru
- Military of Uganda
- List of power stations in Uganda
