= Field marshal (Uganda) =

Highest rank in the Uganda Army (1975–1979)

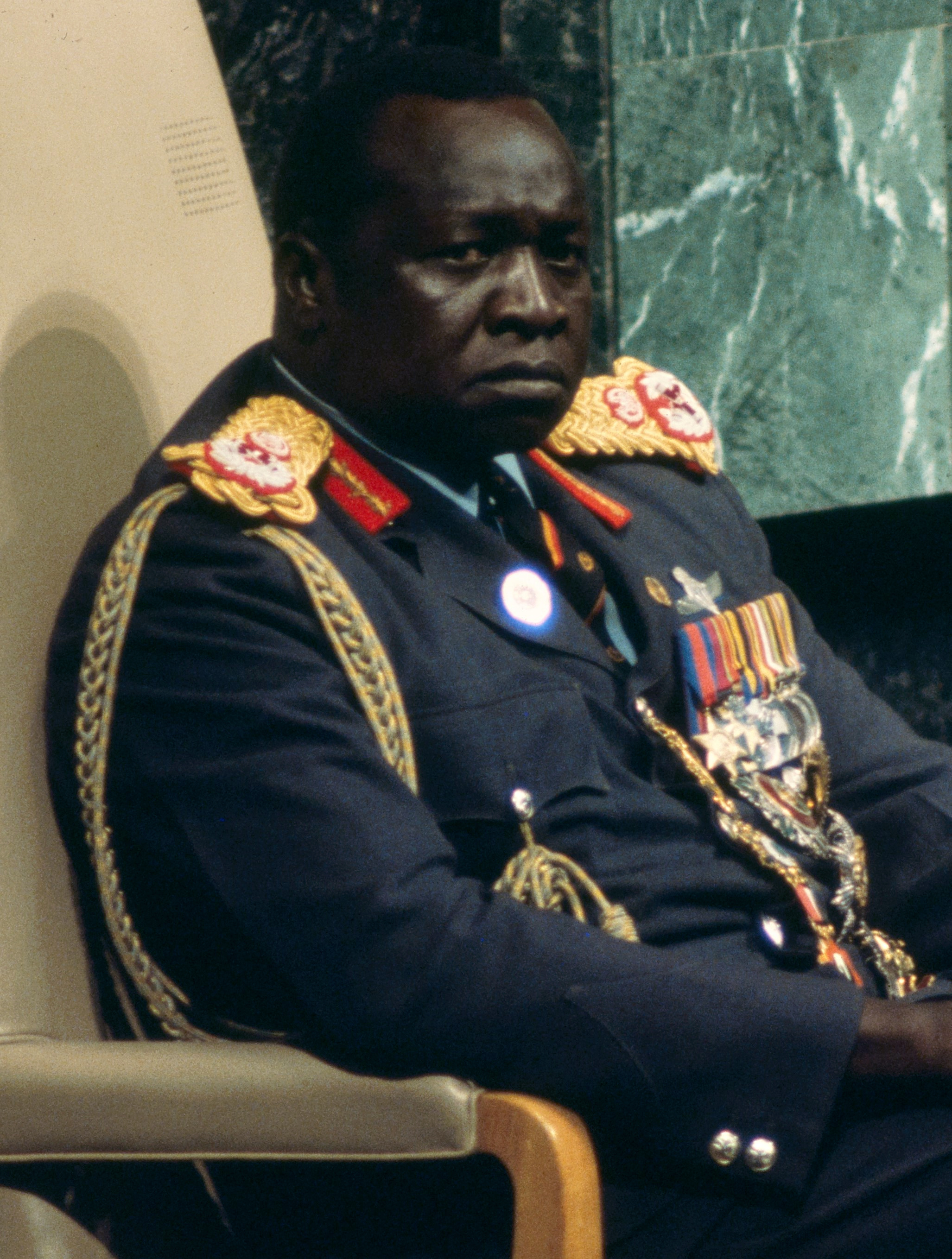
- Amin as field marshal, October 1975
- Country: Uganda (Second Republic)
- Service branch: Uganda Army
- Rank group: General officer
- Rank: Field marshal
- Formation: 17 July 1975
- Abolished: 3 June 1979
- Next lower rank: General

Field marshal was the highest rank in the military of Uganda, during the regime of Idi Amin.

== History of the rank ==
On 17 July 1975, Idi Amin, President of Uganda and the commander-in-chief of the country's military at the time, the Uganda Army (UA), awarded himself the rank of field marshal. Officially, the rank was given to Amin by the Defence Council (which he himself chaired). Amin was then decorated with the rank insignia by Maj. Gen. Mustafa Adrisi at a function held at the State House in the capital, Entebbe.

== Present status ==
Presently, the highest ranking individual in the current Ugandan military, the Uganda People's Defence Force (UPDF), is President Yoweri Museveni, who uses the rank of general. In 2021, there were calls by Defence Minister Charles Engola to promote Museveni to the rank of field marshal as well. The UPDF announced that Museveni will be awarded the rank in the next promotions.

== See also ==
- Military history of Uganda
- Uganda Army (1962–1971)
- Uganda Army (1971–1980)
- Military ranks of Uganda
