= Joint Anti-Terrorist Task Force of Uganda =

Ugandan security agency

Joint Anti-Terrorist Task Force (JATT)
Agency overview
- Formed: May 13, 1999
- Jurisdiction: Uganda
- Headquarters: Kampala, Uganda
- Employees: Classified
- Annual budget: Classified
- Parent agency: Government of Uganda

The Joint Anti-Terrorist Task Force (JATF) is a security agency of the Government of Uganda. The Museveni administration created the JATF through the Anti-Terrorism Act of 2002.

The Task Force's main focus is fighting the Lord's Resistance Army, a militant cult operating in northern Uganda which the United States government designated a terrorist organization in 2001. Along with the Internal Security Organization (ISO) and the Chieftaincy of Military Intelligence (CMI), from which the JATF draws many of its members, since its inception, the unit has thwarted several terrorism incidents and continue to operate behind curtains for most of its operations.

== See also ==
- Human rights in Uganda
- Uganda People's Defence Force
