= Uganda Ministry of Defence Headquarters =

Headquarters of Uganda's Ministry of Defence

- Interactive map of the Uganda Ministry of Defence Headquarters area

General information
- Type: Office
- Location: Mbuya, Kampala, Uganda
- Coordinates: 00°19′41″N 32°37′51″E
- Construction started: August 2024
- Completed: H2 2027 (Expected)
- Cost: US$25.5 million (USh94 billion)

Technical details
- Floor count: 5

The Uganda Ministry of Defence Headquarters, also Uganda Ministry of Defence Complex, is a twin-tower building complex under construction in Uganda, that is intended to serve as the headquarters of the Uganda Ministry of Defence and Veterans Affairs (MoDVA).

== Location ==
The building complex is located on top of Mbuya Hill, in the Nakawa Division of Kampala, Uganda's capital and largest city. The building complex lies within Mbuya UPDF Military Barracks. This is approximately 8 kilometres (5 mi), by road, northeast the central business district of Kampala.

== Overview ==
As of August 2024, the Uganda Ministry of Defence and Veteran Affairs maintained its headquarters in a modest building on Mbuya Hill. The Uganda People's Defence Forces (UPDF) also maintained headquarters in a nearby modest building.

On 26 August 2024 with USh20 billion (approx. US$5.5 million) availed by the Uganda Ministry of Finance, construction on the twin tower began. The new complex will accommodate the headquarters of both the MoDVA and the UPDF.

== Properties ==
The building complex comprises two adjacent towers, each 5 stories tall. Other improvements include a new 2 kilometres (1 mi) perimeter security fence, an expanded Chwa II Road, a new alternative security road and a new quarter guard (entrance to the barracks).

== Construction ==
The engineering, procurement and construction (EPC) contract was awarded to the UPDF Engineering Brigade. Construction started in August 2024, with completion expected in H2 2027.

== Funding ==
The construction budget is reported at US$25.5 million (USh94 billion). The government of Uganda is funding the construction costs for this infrastructure project.

== See also ==
- Kampala Capital City Authority
- List of tallest buildings in Kampala
- Uganda Ministry of Education Complex
- Nakawa Division
