= Vincent Ssempijja =

Ugandan politician

- Born: 28 November 1956 (age 69); Kalungu District, Uganda
- Citizenship: Uganda
- Education: Nkumba University (BA in Public Administration) (MA in Public Administration)
- Occupations: Administrator & Politician
- Years active: 1986 — present
- Known for: Politics

Vincent Bamulangaki Ssempijja is a politician, in Uganda. He has served as the Minister of Defence since June 2021 to 2024. He previously served as the Cabinet Minister of Agriculture, Animal Industry and Fisheries from 2016 to 2021. He previously served as State Minister for Agriculture, between 1 March 2015 and 6 June 2016. He also served as the elected Member of Parliament, representing "Kalungu County East", in Kalungu District up till 2021.

== Background and education ==
Ssempijja was born in Kalungu District, in Buganda, on 28 November 1956. He completed his O-Level studies in 1974, and his A-Level education in 1976. He holds the degree of Bachelor of Arts in Public Administration, obtained from Nkumba University in 2007. His degree of Master of Arts in Public Administration, was obtained in 2010, also from Nkumba University.

== Career ==
Prior to 2011, Ssempijja served as the District Chairman for Masaka District. This was before Kalungu District, Lwengo District and Bukomansimbi District were peeled off of the old Masaka District. In 2011, he was elected to the 9th Ugandan Parliament to represent "Kalungu County East". He ran as an Independent. In a cabinet reshuffle on 1 March 2015, President Yoweri Museveni, appointed him State Minister for Agriculture. On 6 June 2016, he was appointed Cabinet Minister of Agriculture, Animal Industry and Fisheries. In June 2021, he was appointed Minister of Defence.
