= Military ranks of Uganda =

Military insignia used by the Uganda People's Defence Force

The military ranks of Uganda are the military insignia used by the Uganda People's Defence Force. Uganda is a landlocked country and therefore does not have a navy. Being a former British protectorate, Uganda shares a rank structure similar to that of the United Kingdom.

== Commissioned officer ranks ==
The rank insignia of commissioned officers.

Rank group	General / flag officers				Senior officers			Junior officers
Ugandan Land Forces
Ugandan Land Forces	General	Lieutenant general	Major general	Brigadier general	Colonel	Lieutenant colonel	Major	Captain	Lieutenant	Second lieutenant
Ugandan Air Force
Ugandan Air Force	General	Lieutenant general	Major general	Brigadier general	Colonel	Lieutenant colonel	Major	Captain	Lieutenant	Second lieutenant
Rank group	General / flag officers				Senior officers			Junior officers

=== Student officer ranks ===
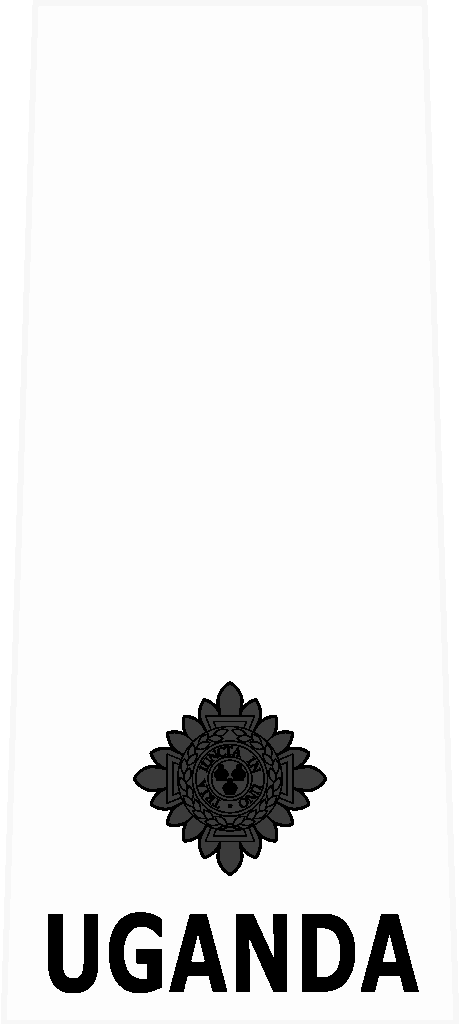
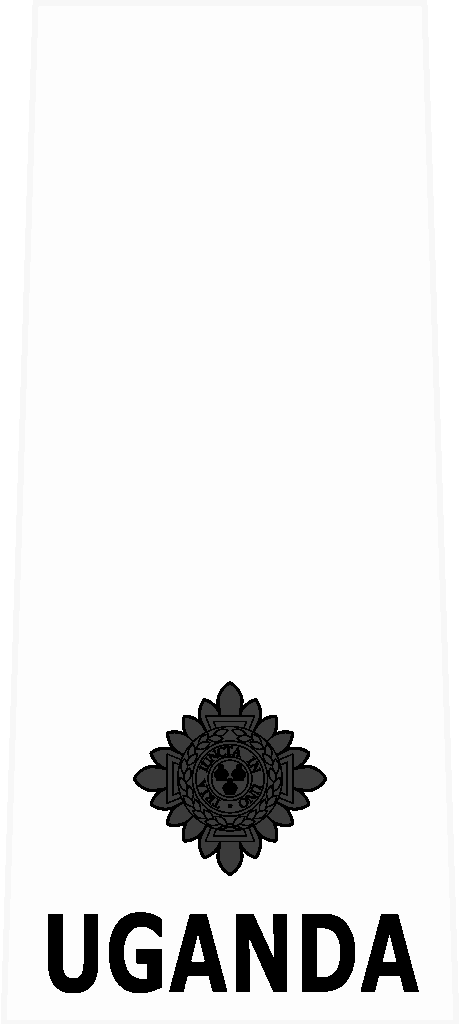
Rank group	Student officer
Ugandan Land Forces
Ugandan Land Forces	Officer cadet
Ugandan Air Force
Ugandan Air Force	Officer cadet

== Other ranks ==
The rank insignia of non-commissioned officers and enlisted personnel.

Rank group	Senior NCOs				Junior NCOs		Enlisted
Ugandan Land Forces							No insignia
Ugandan Land Forces	Warrant officer class 1	Warrant officer class 2	Staff sergeant	Sergeant	Corporal	Lance corporal	Private (or equivalent)
Ugandan Air Force							No insignia
Ugandan Air Force	Warrant officer class 1	Warrant officer class 2	Staff sergeant	Sergeant	Corporal	Lance corporal	Private (or equivalent)
Rank group	Senior NCOs				Junior NCOs		Enlisted

=== Senior appointments ===
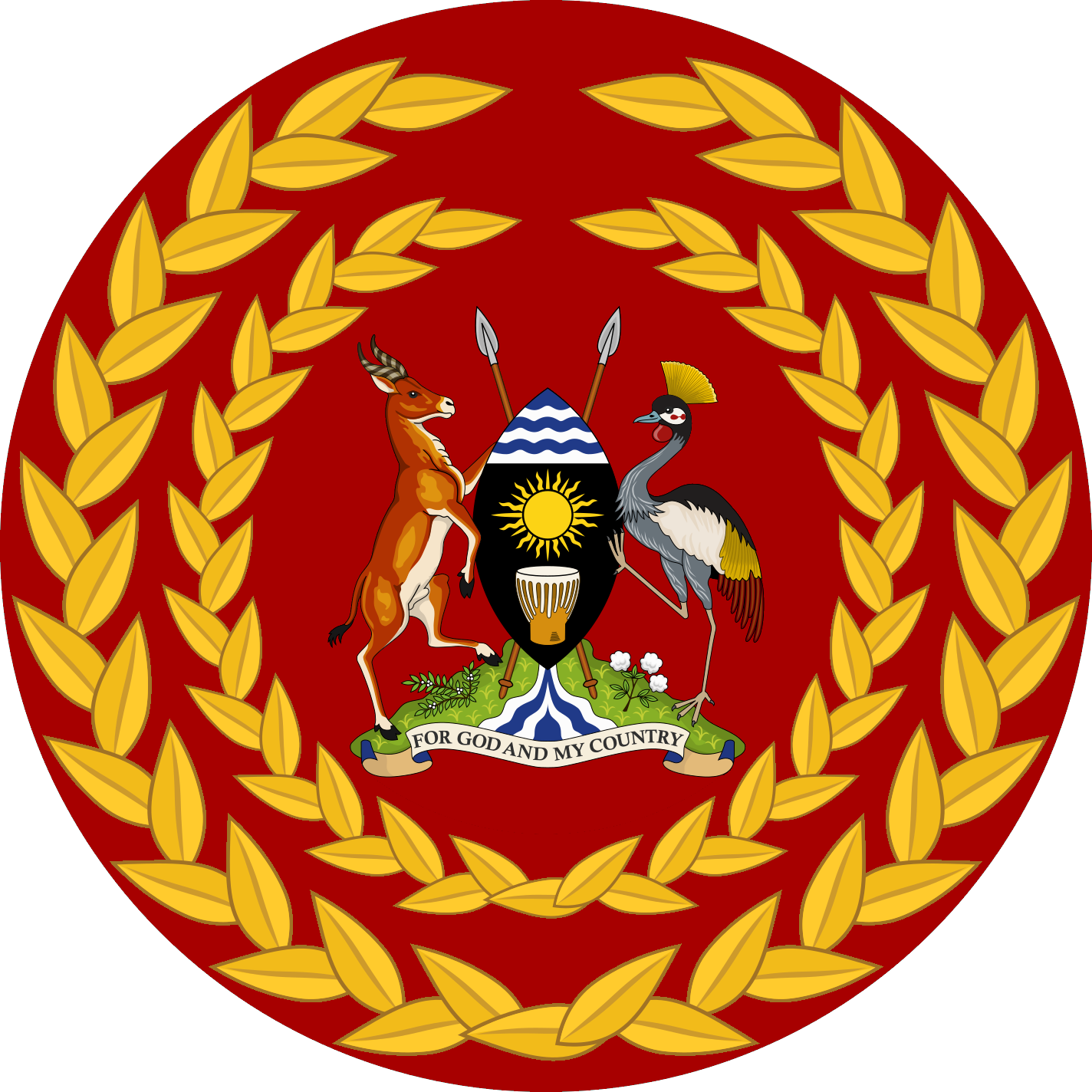
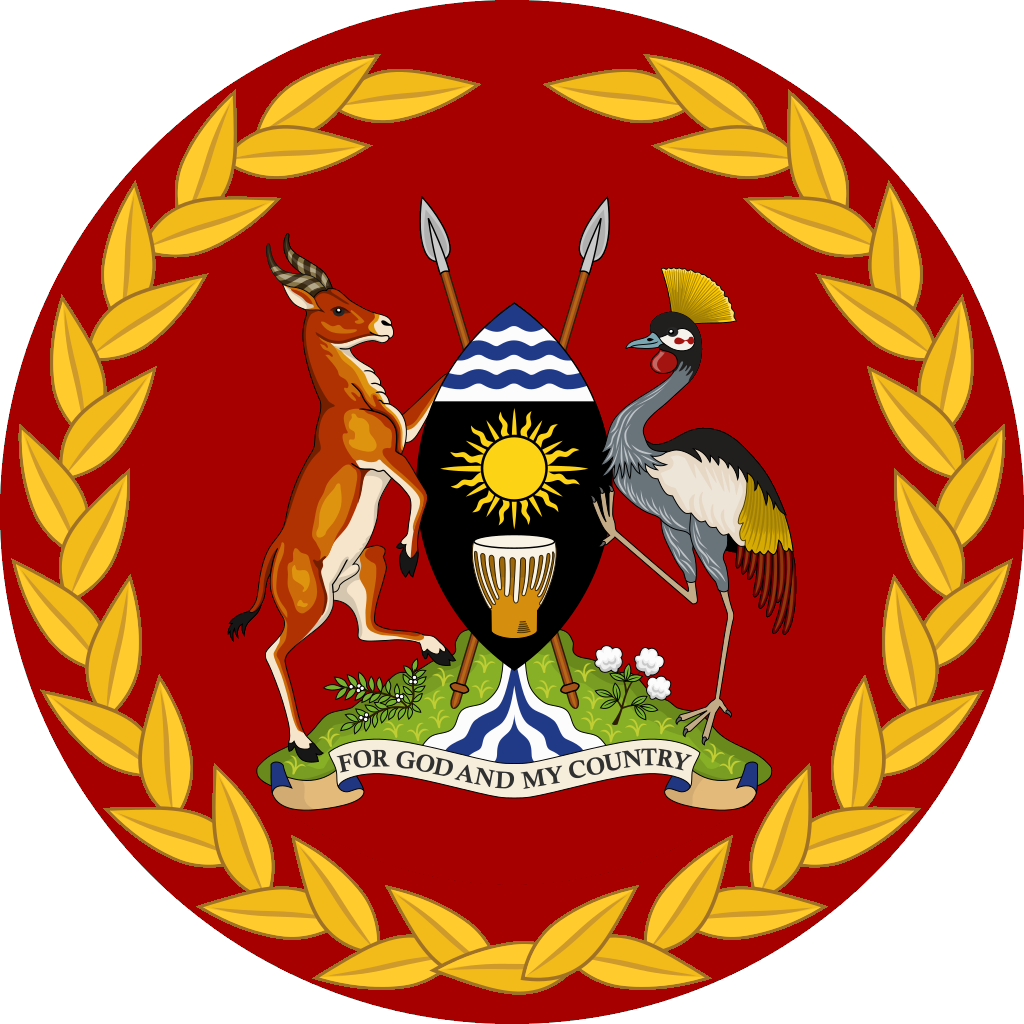
Rank group	Senior NCOs
Ugandan Land Forces
Ugandan Land Forces	Defence Force sergeant major	Service sergeant major

== Former insignia ==
=== Commissioned officer ranks ===
The rank insignia of commissioned officers.

Rank group	General officers
Ugandan Land Forces (1975–1979)
Ugandan Land Forces (1975–1979)	Field marshal

Rank group	General / flag officers				Senior officers			Junior officers
Ugandan Land Forces (–2019)
Ugandan Land Forces (–2019)	General	Lieutenant general	Major general	Brigadier	Colonel	Lieutenant colonel	Major	Captain	Lieutenant	Second lieutenant
Ugandan Air Force (–2019)
Ugandan Air Force (–2019)	General	Lieutenant general	Major general	Brigadier	Colonel	Lieutenant colonel	Major	Captain	Lieutenant	Second lieutenant
Rank group	General / flag officers				Senior officers			Junior officers
