= Uganda People's Defence Force =

Armed forces of Uganda

- Uganda People's Defence Force flag
- Founded: 1962; 64 years ago
- Current form: 1995
- Service branches: Ugandan Land Forces; Ugandan Air Force; Ugandan Special Forces Command; Ugandan Reserve Forces
- Headquarters: Mbuya Hill, Kampala, Uganda

Leadership
- Commander-in-Chief: Yoweri Kaguta Museveni
- Minister of Defence and Veteran Affairs: Jacob Oboth-Oboth
- Chief of Defence Forces: General Muhoozi Kainerugaba

Personnel
- Military age: 18 years of age
- Active personnel: 45,000 (2022)

Expenditure
- Budget: US$1.1 billion (2024)
- Percent of GDP: 1.8% (2024)

Industry
- Domestic suppliers: National Enterprise Corporation
- Foreign suppliers: France; European Union; Belgium; United Kingdom; United States; South Korea; Japan; Russia; India; South Africa; China; Brazil; Cuba; Mexico; Canada; Israel; North Korea

Related articles
- History: Military history of Uganda
- Ranks: Military ranks of Uganda

Parliamentary Seats
- Seats in the Parliament of Uganda: 10 / 529 (2%)

The Uganda People's Defence Force (UPDF), previously known as the National Resistance Army (NRA), is the armed forces of Uganda. From 2007 to 2011, the International Institute for Strategic Studies estimated the UPDF had a total strength of 40,000–45,000, consisting of land forces and an air wing. Recruitment to the forces is done annually.

After Uganda achieved independence on 9 October 1962, British officers retained most high-level military commands. Ugandans in the rank and file claimed this policy blocked promotions and kept their salaries disproportionately low. These complaints eventually destabilized the armed forces, already weakened by ethnic divisions. Each post-independence regime expanded the size of the army, usually by recruiting from among people of one region or ethnic group, and each government employed military force to subdue political unrest.

== History ==
The origins of the Ugandan armed forces can be traced to 1902, when the Uganda Battalion of the King's African Rifles was formed. Ugandan soldiers fought as part of the King's African Rifles during the First World War and Second World War. As Uganda moved toward independence, the army stepped up recruitment, and the government increased the use of the army to quell domestic unrest. The army became more closely involved in politics, setting a pattern that continued after independence. In January 1960, for example, troops were deployed to Bugisu and Bukedi districts in the east to quell political violence. In the process, the soldiers killed 12 people, injured several hundred, and arrested more than 1,000. A series of similar clashes occurred between troops and demonstrators, and in March 1962 the government recognized the army's growing domestic importance by transferring control of the military to the Ministry of Home Affairs.

=== First post-independence military, 1962–1971 ===
On 9 October 1962, Uganda became independent from the United Kingdom, with the 4th Battalion, King's African Rifles, based at Jinja, becoming the Uganda Rifles. The traditional leader of the Baganda, Edward Mutesa, became president of Uganda. Milton Obote, a northerner and longtime opponent of autonomy for the southern kingdoms including Buganda, was prime minister. Mutesa recognized the seriousness of the rank-and-file demands for Africanising the officer corps, but was more concerned about the potential northern domination of the military, a concern that reflected the power struggle between Mutesa and Obote. Mutesa used his political power to protect the interests of his Baganda constituency and refused to support demands for Africanisation of the officer ranks.

On 1 August 1962, the Uganda Rifles was renamed the "Uganda Army". The armed forces more than doubled, from 700 personnel to 1,500, and the government created the 2nd Battalion stationed at the northeastern town of Moroto on 14 November 1963. Omara-Otunnu wrote in 1987 that "a large number of men had been recruited into the Army to form this new battalion, and ... the new recruits were not given proper training" because the Army was already heavily committed to its various operations.

In January 1964, following a mutiny by Tanganyikan soldiers in protest over their own Africanisation crisis, unrest spread throughout the Uganda Army. On 22 January 1964, soldiers of the 1st Battalion in Jinja mutinied to press their demands for a pay raise and a Ugandan officer corps. They also detained their British officers, several non-commissioned officers, and Minister of Interior Felix Onama, who had arrived in Jinja to represent the government's views to the rank and file. Obote appealed for British military support, hoping to prevent the mutiny from spreading to other parts of the country. About 450 British soldiers from the 2nd Battalion, The Scots Guards and Staffordshire Regiment (elements of the 24th Infantry Brigade) responded. They surrounded the First Battalion barracks at Jinja, seized the armory, and quelled the mutiny. The government responded two days later by dismissing several hundred soldiers from the army, several of whom were subsequently detained.

Although the authorities later released many of the detained soldiers and reinstated some in the army, the mutiny marked a turning point in civil–military relations. The mutiny reinforced the army's political strength. Within weeks of the mutiny, the president's cabinet also approved a military pay raise retroactive to 1 January 1964, more than doubling the salaries of those in private to staff-sergeant ranks. Additionally, the government raised defense allocations by 400 percent. The number of Ugandan officers increased from 18 to 55. Two northerners, Shaban Opolot and Idi Amin, assumed command positions in the Uganda Army and later received promotions to Brigadier and commander in chief, and army chief of staff, respectively.

Following the 1964 mutiny, the government remained fearful of internal opposition. Obote moved the army headquarters approximately 87 kilometres (54 mi) from Jinja to Kampala. He also created a secret police force, the General Service Unit (GSU) to bolster security. Most GSU employees guarded government offices in and around Kampala; however, some employees have also served in overseas embassies and other locations throughout Uganda. When British training programs ended, Israel started training Uganda's army, air force, and GSU personnel. Several other countries also provided military assistance to Uganda.

Decalo writes:

using classic 'divide and rule' tactics, he [Obote] appointed different foreign military missions to each battalion, scrambled operational chains of command, played the police off against the army, encouraged personal infighting between his main military 'proteges' and removed from operational command of troops officers who appeared unreliable or too authoritative.

When Congolese aircraft bombed the West Nile villages of Paidha and Goli on 13 February 1965, Obote again increased military recruitment and doubled the army's size to more than 4,500. Units established included a third battalion at Mubende, a signals squadron at Jinja, and an antiaircraft detachment. On 1 July 1965, six units were formed: a brigade reconnaissance, an army ordnance depot (seemingly located at Magamaga), a brigade signals squadron training wing, a records office, a pay and pensions office, and a Uganda army workshop.

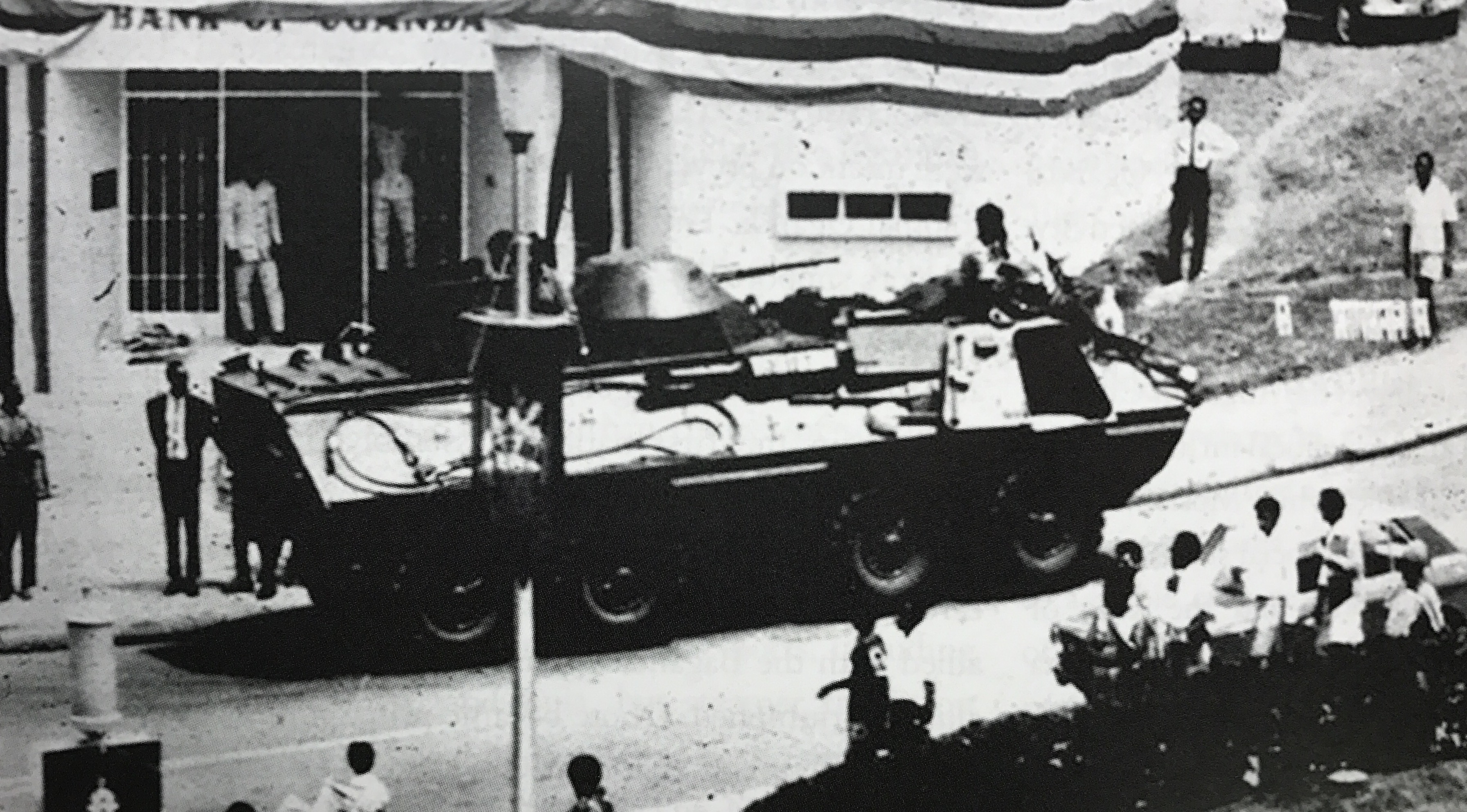
A Uganda Army OT-64 SKOT armoured personnel carrier during a military parade in Kampala in the late 1960s

Tensions rose in the power struggle over control of the government and the army and over the relationship between the army and the Baganda people. During Obote's absence on 4 February 1966, a motion opposing him was introduced to parliament by Grace Ibingira, which called to suspend Amin and investigate Obote and three others (including Amin) for supposedly accepting gold and ivory from Congolese rebels. On 22 February, Obote arrested Ibingira and four other ministers, essentially dismantling opposition to himself in the Ugandan People's Congress. Later, Amin was appointed Chief of the Army and Air Force Staff, while Brigadier Opolot was demoted to the Ministry of Defence as Chief of the Defence Staff. On 24 May 1966, Obote ousted Mutesa, assumed his office as president and commander in chief, suspended the 1962 constitution, and consolidated his control over the military by eliminating several rivals. In October 1966 Opolot was dismissed from the army and detained under the emergency regulations then in force.

At about the same time, Obote abrogated the constitution, revoked Buganda's autonomous status, and instructed the Army to attack the Kabaka's palace, forcing the Kabaka to flee. Elections were cancelled. Political loyalty rather than military skill became critical amongst both officers and men. Many educated southern officers were court-martialled or dismissed in 1966 and 1967, and ethnicity became the key factor in recruitment and promotions.

In 1970, the International Institute for Strategic Studies (IISS) assessed the Ugandan armed forces to consist of 6,700 personnel, constituting an army of 6,250 with two brigade groups, each of two battalions, plus an independent infantry battalion, with some Ferret armoured cars, and BTR-40 and BTR-152 armoured personnel carriers, plus an air arm of 450 with 12 Fouga Magister armed jet trainers, and seven MiG-15s and MiG-17s.

=== Uganda Army of Idi Amin, 1971–1979 ===
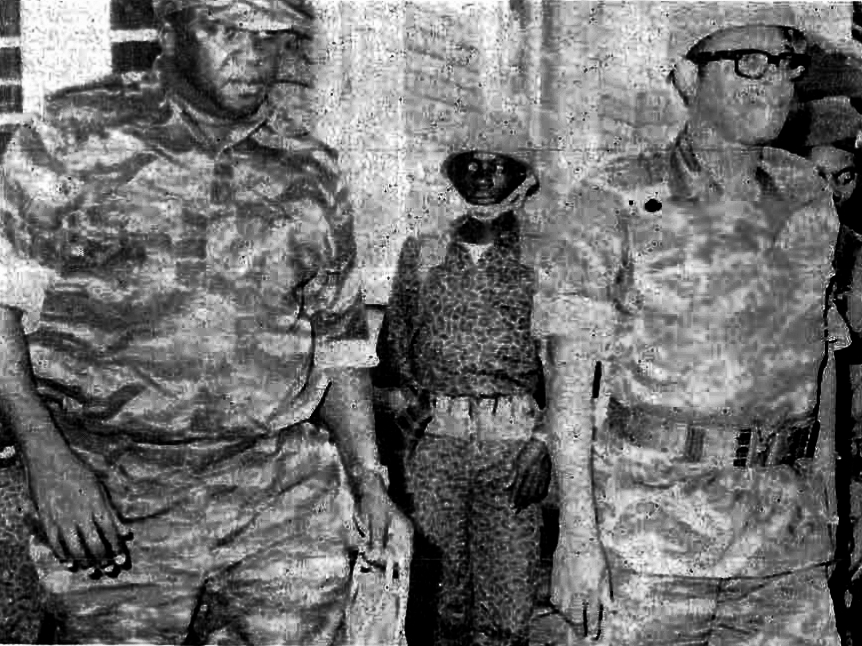
Idi Amin (left), dressed in military fatigues, visits the Zairian dictator Mobutu in 1977.

In January 1971, Amin and his followers within the army seized power in a coup d'état.

Shortly after the expulsion of Asians in 1972, Idi Amin launched a small invasion across the Tanzanian border into south-western Uganda. His small army contingent in 27 trucks set out to capture the southern Ugandan military post at Masaka but instead settled down to await a general uprising against Amin, which did not occur. A planned seizure of the airport at Entebbe by soldiers in an allegedly hijacked East African Airways passenger aircraft was aborted when Obote's pilot blew out the aircraft's tires, causing it to remain in Tanzania. Amin was able to mobilize his more reliable Malire Mechanised Regiment and expel the invaders.

In 1976, during Operation Entebbe, the Israeli military destroyed 12 MiG-21s and three MiG-17s based at Entebbe Airport to prevent pursuit.

In 1977, before the Uganda–Tanzania War, the Ugandan armed forces were reported by IISS as consisting of 20,000 land forces personnel, with two four-battalion brigades and five other battalions of various types, plus a training regiment. There were a total of 35 T-34, T-55, and M-4 Sherman medium tanks. SIPRI assessed decades later that ten T-34s had been supplied from Libya in 1975–76. An air arm was 1,000 strong with 21 MiG-21 and 10 MiG-17 combat aircraft. The IISS noted that the Uganda Army collapsed in the face of the Tanzanian onslaught and the serviceable aircraft were removed to Tanzania. Its remnants fled into exile in Zaire and Sudan, from where they launched an insurgency. Meanwhile, pro-Tanzanian rebel groups were reorganized to become Uganda's new regular military.

=== UNLA, 1979–1986 ===
After the Uganda–Tanzania War, fighters available to the new government included only the fewer than 1,000 troops who had fought alongside the Tanzanian People's Defence Force (TPDF) to expel Amin. The army was back to the size of the original army at independence in 1962. Titularly, Colonel Tito Okello served as army commander and Colonel David Oyite Ojok as chief of staff, leading the Uganda National Liberation Army (UNLA).

But in 1979, in an attempt to consolidate support for the future, leaders such as Yoweri Museveni and Major General (later Chief of Staff) Ojok began to enroll thousands of recruits into what were rapidly becoming their private armies. Museveni's 80 original soldiers grew to 8,000; Ojok's original 600 became 24,000. When then-President Godfrey Binaisa sought to curb the use of these militias, which were harassing and detaining political opponents, he was overthrown in a military coup on 10 May 1980. The coup was engineered by Ojok, Museveni, and others acting under the general direction of Paulo Muwanga, Obote's right-hand man and chair of the Military Commission. The TPDF was still providing necessary security while Uganda's police force—which had been decimated by Amin—was rebuilt, but President Julius Nyerere of Tanzania refused to help Binaisa retain power. Many Ugandans claimed that although Nyerere did not impose his own choice on Uganda, he indirectly facilitated the return to power of his old friend and ally, Obote. In any case, the Military Commission headed by Muwanga effectively governed Uganda during the six months leading up to the national elections of December 1980.

A Commonwealth Military Training Team - Uganda assisted the UNLA in the early 1980s.

After the Museveni government was formed in 1986, an NRA code of conduct, originally formulated in the bush in 1982, was made public. This was later formalized as Legal Notice No. 1 of 1986 (Amendment), and served as a basis for relations among soldiers and between the NRA and the public. After the MRM victory steps were taken to institutionalize the NRA, including the setting-up of a bureaucracy; uniforms; regimental colours; training programmes; ranks; and pay and privileges. A number of key Rwanda Patriotic Front personnel became part of the National Resistance Army that became Uganda's new national armed forces. Fred Rwigyema was appointed deputy minister of defense and deputy army commander-in-chief, second only to Museveni in the military chain of command for the nation. Paul Kagame was appointed acting chief of military intelligence. Other Tutsi refugees were highly placed: Peter Baingana was head of NRA medical services and Chris Bunyenyezi was the commander of the 306th Brigade. Tutsi refugees formed a disproportionate number of NRA officers for the simple reason that they had joined the rebellion early and thus had accumulated more experience.

=== Uganda Peoples' Defence Force (UPDF), 1995–present ===
The NRA had been successful in its war, and its senior military officers held key political positions in the NRM. It was reduced in size under pressure from donors, unwilling to fund either an outsize army or civil service. Between 1990 and 1996 the army was reduced from 100,000 to 40,000, and the civil service from 320,000 to 156,000. Yet the defence budget rose from $44 million in 1991 as far as $200 million in 2004. Somerville ascribes the budget rise to the rebellion in the north, Uganda's military intervention in the Congo, and "massive corruption" - 'ghost soldiers' who did not exist, whose (real) salaries were claimed by senior officers.

The National Resistance Army was renamed the Uganda People's Defence Force following the enactment of the 1995 Constitution of Uganda.

UPDF's primary focus was the conflict with the Lord's Resistance Army (LRA), a rebel group operating in the country's northern region. Since March 2002, UPDF has been granted permission to carry out operations against LRA bases across the border in South Sudan. These raids, collectively known as Operation Iron Fist, have resulted in the repatriation of many abducted children being held by the rebels as child soldiers or sex slaves. The LRA has fled Uganda and been pushed deep into the jungles of the Central African Republic and the Democratic Republic of the Congo (DRC) (principally Orientale Province).

The UPDF has also been the subject of controversy for having a minimum age for service of 13. Many international organizations have condemned this as being military use of children. This has created an image problem for the UPDF and may have impacted the international aid Uganda receives. Western nations have sent a limited level of military aid to Uganda. "Between 1990 and 2002, the army payroll had at least 18,000 ghost soldiers, according to a report by General David Tinyefuza."

The problem continued in 2003, when there was a severe problem of "ghost" soldiers within the UPDF. As of 2008, these personnel problems has been exacerbated by the surge of UPDF troops resigning to work with the Coalition Forces in Iraq. They mostly work as an additional guard force at control points and dining facilities, for example.

Prior to 2000, the United States armed forces trained together with the UPDF as part of the African Crisis Response Initiative. This cooperation was terminated in 2000 because of Uganda's incursion into the DRC. Following the June 2003 UPDF withdrawal of troops from the DRC, limited nonlethal military assistance has restarted. The UPDF participates in the African Contingency Operations Training and Assistance programme with the United States.

After several interventions in the Congo, the UPDF was involved in a further incursion there, from December 2008 stretching into February 2009, against the LRA in the Garamba area. UPDF special forces and artillery, supported by aircraft, were joined by the DRC's armed forces and elements of the Sudan People's Liberation Army. Called "Operation Lightning Thunder" by the UPDF, it was commanded by Brigadier Patrick Kankiriho, commander of the 3rd Division.

In February 2023, President Museveni warned the UPDF against brutality towards civilians, and corruption.

== Recent operations ==
=== African Union Mission in Somalia ===
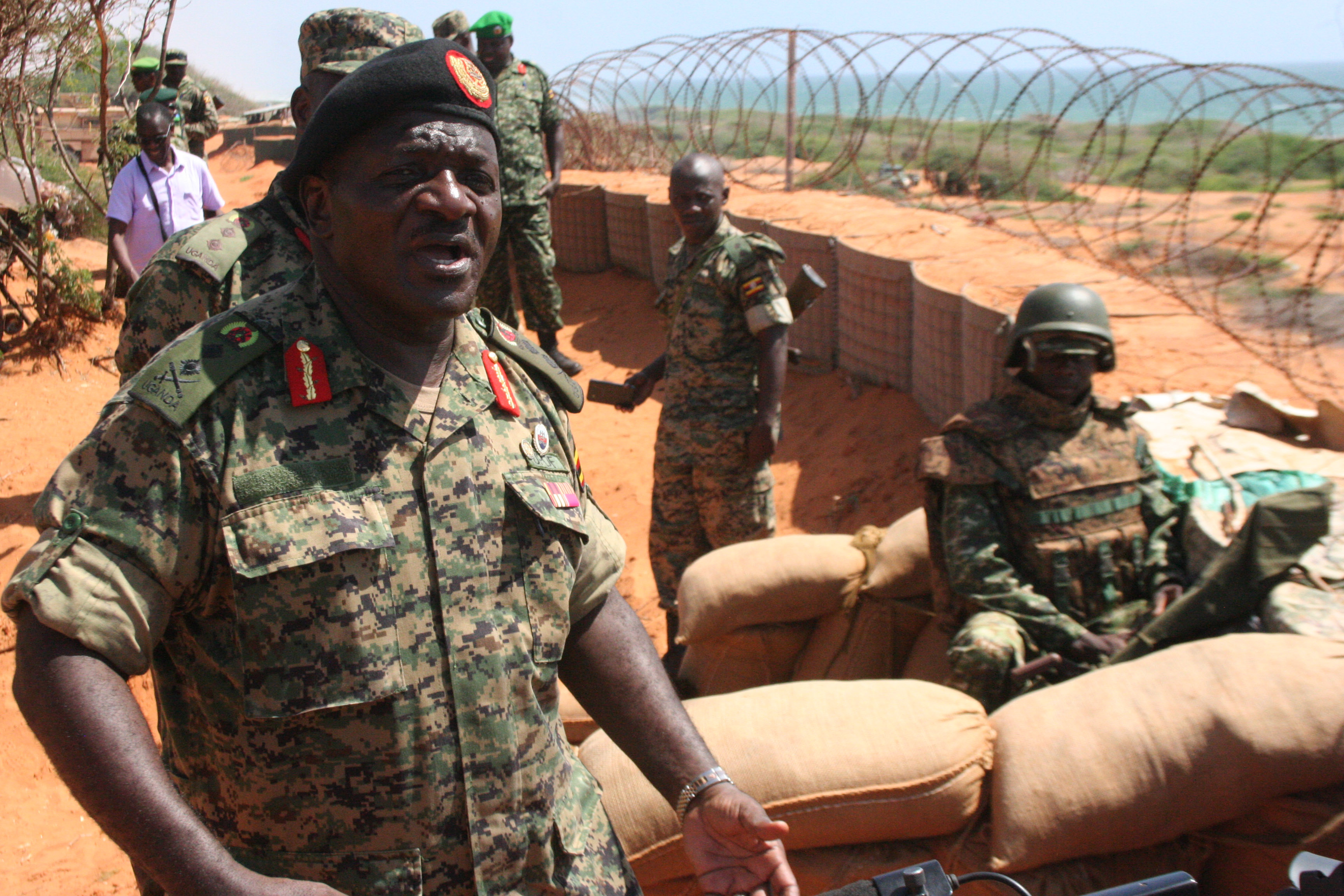
Ugandan Chief of Defence Forces General Katumba Wamala with Ugandan soldiers as part of AMISOM in 2017

The UPDF has more than 6,200 soldiers serving with the African Union Mission in Somalia (AMISOM). The AMISOM force commander is Kenyan Lieutenant General Jonathan Rono. The force commander in 2009, Ugandan Major General Nathan Mugisha, was wounded in a car bomb attack on 17 September 2009 that left nine soldiers dead, including Burundian Major General Juvenal Niyoyunguruza, the second in command.

The USA has provided extensive training for UPDF contingents headed for Somalia. During 2010, United States Army Reserve Civil Affairs operators from the 411th Civil Affairs Battalion (United States) taught Civil-military operations to UPDF personnel at Camp Kesenyi on the shores of Lake Victoria. In the first half of 2012, Force Recon Marines from Special Purpose Marine Air-Ground Task Force 12 (SPMAGTF-12) trained soldiers from the UPDF.

In addition, a significant amount of support to AMISOM has been provided by private companies. "Bancroft Global Development, headquartered on Washington's Embassy Row, employs about 40 South African and European trainers who work with [AMISOM's] Ugandan and Burundian troops." Bancroft director Michael Stock told The EastAfrican that these mentors are embedded with AMISOM units in Mogadishu and southern and central Somalia. They coach commanders on how to predict and defeat the tactics which foreign fighters bring from outside East Africa and teach to al-Shabaab.

On 12 August 2012, two Ugandan Mil Mi-24s flying from Entebbe across Kenya to Somalia crashed in rugged terrain in Kenya. They were found two days later, burned out, with no likely survivors from the ten Ugandan servicemen on board the two helicopters. Another aircraft from the same flight crashed on Mount Kenya, and all seven Ugandan servicemen on board were rescued a day later. The aircraft were supporting AMISOM in the ongoing Somali Civil War. An accompanying Mil Mi-17 transport helicopter landed without problems in the eastern Kenyan town of Garissa near the Somali border for a scheduled refuelling stop.

In August 2014, AMISOM launched Operation Indian Ocean against al-Shabaab in Lower Shabelle and other coastal areas of southcentral Somalia. On 1 September 2014, a U.S. drone strike carried out as part of the broader mission killed Al-Shabaab leader Moktar Ali Zubeyr. According to Pentagon spokesperson Admiral John Kirby, the Ugandan AMISOM forces had informed U.S. intelligence about where Godane and other Al-Shabaab leaders were meeting and provided information on a convoy of vehicles in which he was traveling.

Al-Shabaab subsequently threatened an attack in Uganda for the UPDF contingent's role within AMISOM and the strike on Godane. The Ugandan security services, with the assistance of the U.S. military and intelligence, then identified and foiled a major Al-Shabaab terrorist attack in the Ugandan capital Kampala. They recovered suicide vests, other explosives, and small arms and detained Al-Shabaab operatives.

On 10 August 2021 Ugandan AMISOM soldiers were ambushed by Al-Shabab near Golweyn in Lower Shabelle. A gunfight ensued in which one UPDF soldier died. But after the gunfight with the insurgents the Ugandan troops allegedly killed seven Somali civilians. AMISOM immediately launched an investigation that will report its findings on 6 September 2021.

=== African Union Regional Task Force ===
In November 2011, the Peace and Security Council of the African Union (AU) authorized a Regional Co-operation Initiative (RCI) for eliminating the Lord's Resistance Army (LRA). The LRA had been forced out of Uganda and was roaming remote areas of (what is now) South Sudan, the Democratic Republic of the Congo (DRC), and the Central African Republic (CAR). The RCI was planned to consist of three elements: a Joint Co-ordination Mechanism chaired by the AU Commissioner for Peace and Security and made up of the Ministers of Defence of the four affected countries (Uganda, South Sudan, the DRC, and the CAR); a Regional Task Force Headquarters; and, the Regional Task Force (RTF) of up to 5,000 troops from the four countries.

United States special forces were already assisting Ugandan forces in their operations against the LRA in the DRC and the CAR. In 2014, these forces were still assisting the RTF.

The RTF started to take form in September 2012. By February 2013, the RTF had 3,350 soldiers and had finished deploying to the three sectors envisioned, with bases at Dungu, Obo, and Nzara (South Sudan).

The RTF headquarters is at Yambio in South Sudan. The first Force Commander was Ugandan Colonel Dick Olum and the Deputy Force Commander was Colonel Gabriel Ayok Akuok.

RTF operations, however, were plagued with difficulties, including the fact that Ugandan forces were restricted from operating in the DRC.

In October 2014, RTF Commander Brigadier Sam Kavuma was deployed to Somalia and his place taken by Brigadier Lucky Kidega By March 2016, the Ugandan RTF Commander was Colonel Richard Otto.

During January 2016, UPDF 11 Battalion was based with the RTF in the CAR. In mid-2016, it was reported that Uganda would withdraw its contribution to the RTF by the end of the year.

=== South Sudan Civil War ===
December 2013: Uganda reportedly deploys troops to Juba to evacuate Ugandan nationals following outbreak of fighting.

13 January 2014: President Museveni speaks of battle 90 km south of Bor involving UPDF.

16 January 2014: Colonel Kayanja Muhanga announced as UPDF force commander in South Sudan.

January 2014: Ambush and battle reported at Tabakeka, a few kilometres outside Bor, with nine UPDF fatalities and 46 wounded.

22 January 2014: Updated casualty report says nine UPDF dead and a dozen wounded, including: Captain Celistine Egau, Sergeant Santos Ochen, Private Richard Oyaka and Private Arthur Mbagira.

9 February 2014: Colonel Kayanja Muhanga, Officer Commanding "Zulu Task Force", promoted to Brigadier.

21 October 2015: First re-deployment of troops out of South Sudan, from forward base in Bor, about 190 km north of Juba.

9 December 2015: Mention of c. 3000 men from South Sudan in seven battalions registering late for upcoming Ugandan election.

14-18 July 2016: Ugandan forces under Brigadier Kayanja Muhanga undertake Operation Okoa Wanaichi in South Sudan, "successfully evacuating up to 40,000 Ugandans and 100 other nationalities who were fleeing the fighting."

=== UN Guard Unit, Somalia ===
The UN Assistance Mission in Somalia (UNSOM) was established on 3 June 2013 by UN Security Council Resolution 2102 and works alongside AMISOM in Somalia. In 2014 it was decided the mission needed a guard unit to secure and protect UN personnel and their installations in Somalia. Uganda has provided this unit, initially of 410 personnel, since 2014. The United Nations Guard Unit, or UNGU, is based at Mogadishu Airport.

- UNGU I (Lt. Col. Wycliffe Keita) – May 2014 to mid-2015
- UNGU II (Lt. Col. Richard Walekura) – mid-2015 to August 2016
- UNGU III (Lt. Col. Keith Katungi) – August 2016 to July 2017
- UNGU IV (Lt. Col. Mike Hyeroba) – July 2017 to mid-2018
- UNGU V (Lt. Col. Stuart Agaba), 529 personnel – mid-2018 to July 2019
- UNGU VI (Lt. Col. Nathan Bainomugisha) - July 2019 to August 2020.
- UNGU VII (Lt. Col. Francis Odikiro), 600 personnel - deployed August 2020.
- UNGU VIII (Lt. Col. Peter Magungu, or Mabunga), 625 personnel - to February 2023.
- UNGU IX (Lt. Col. Peter Okwi Omeja )- February 2023 to present.

=== Uganda Military Training and Mentoring Team, Equatorial Guinea ===
During February 2017 Uganda deployed a UPDF team to Equatorial Guinea to assist in the training of that country's armed forces. The second contingent of 248 personnel was welcomed back in Uganda in January 2019 when a third team was dispatched. The foreign mission is known as the Uganda Military Training and Mentoring Team, abbreviated as UMTMT.

- UMTMT 1 – 100–150 personnel; deployed February 2017
- UMTMT 2 – 248 personnel; until January 2019
- UMTMT 3 – Deployed January 2019
- UMTMT 4
- UMTMT 5 (Col. James Kato Kalyebara) - completed 'post-mission ideological training course' during January 2022.

== Command and organisation ==
=== Training schools ===
The UPDF has the following training schools:

- Senior Command and Staff College, Kimaka (Brigadier General David Gonyi)
- Junior Staff College, Jinja (Brig Gen Chris Ogwal)
- Uganda Military Academy, Kabamba (Brig Gen Wycliffe Keita)
- Uganda Military Engineering College (University Military Science & Technology, Lugazi)
- College of Logistics and Engineering (COLE) (Magamaga - Mayuge District. 91 km East of Kampala)
- Oliver Tambo Leadership School, Kawaweta, (Col Justus Rukundo) Nakaseke District
- Armoured Warfare Training School, Karama Mubende (Brigadier Francis Chemonges)
- Singo Peace Support Training Centre (Colonel Moses Nabaasa)
- Kaweweta Recruits Training School (Brig Gen John Patrick Otongo)
- National Leadership Institute Kyankwanzi (Colonel Okei Rukogota)
- Bihanga Military Training School, Ibanda (Major General Paul Muhanguzi)
- Hima Training School, Kasese (Colonel Martin Nahurira)
- Anti-terrorism Centre (Brig Gen Ceaser Bahwezi)
- Uganda Rapid Deployment Capability, Jinja (Brigadier General Emmanuel Kazahura)
- Uganda Air Defence and Artillery School, Olilim, Katakwi District (Colonel Rogers D. Kitwara)
- Uganda Air Force Academy, Nakasongola, Nakasongola District
- Uganda Urban Warfare Training School, Singo, Nakaseke District

== Land Force ==
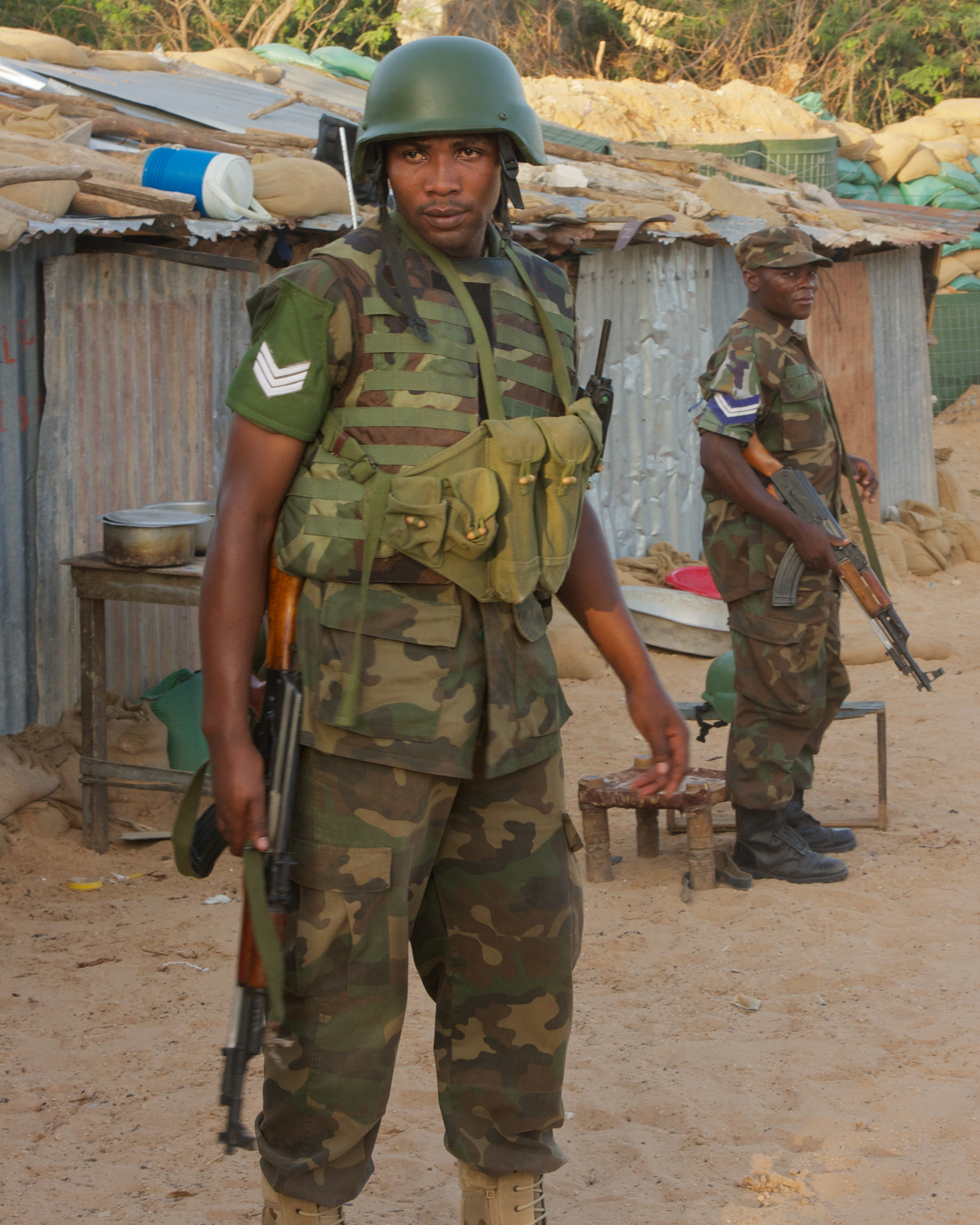
A Ugandan soldier in 2011

The organisation of the land force was reported in 2015 to be as follows:

- Five division headquarters
- One armoured brigade
- One motorised infantry brigade
- One tank battalion
- Presidential Guard brigade
- One engineer brigade
- One commando battalion
- 5 infantry divisions (total: 16 infantry brigades)
- One artillery brigade
- Two air defence battalions

=== Divisions ===
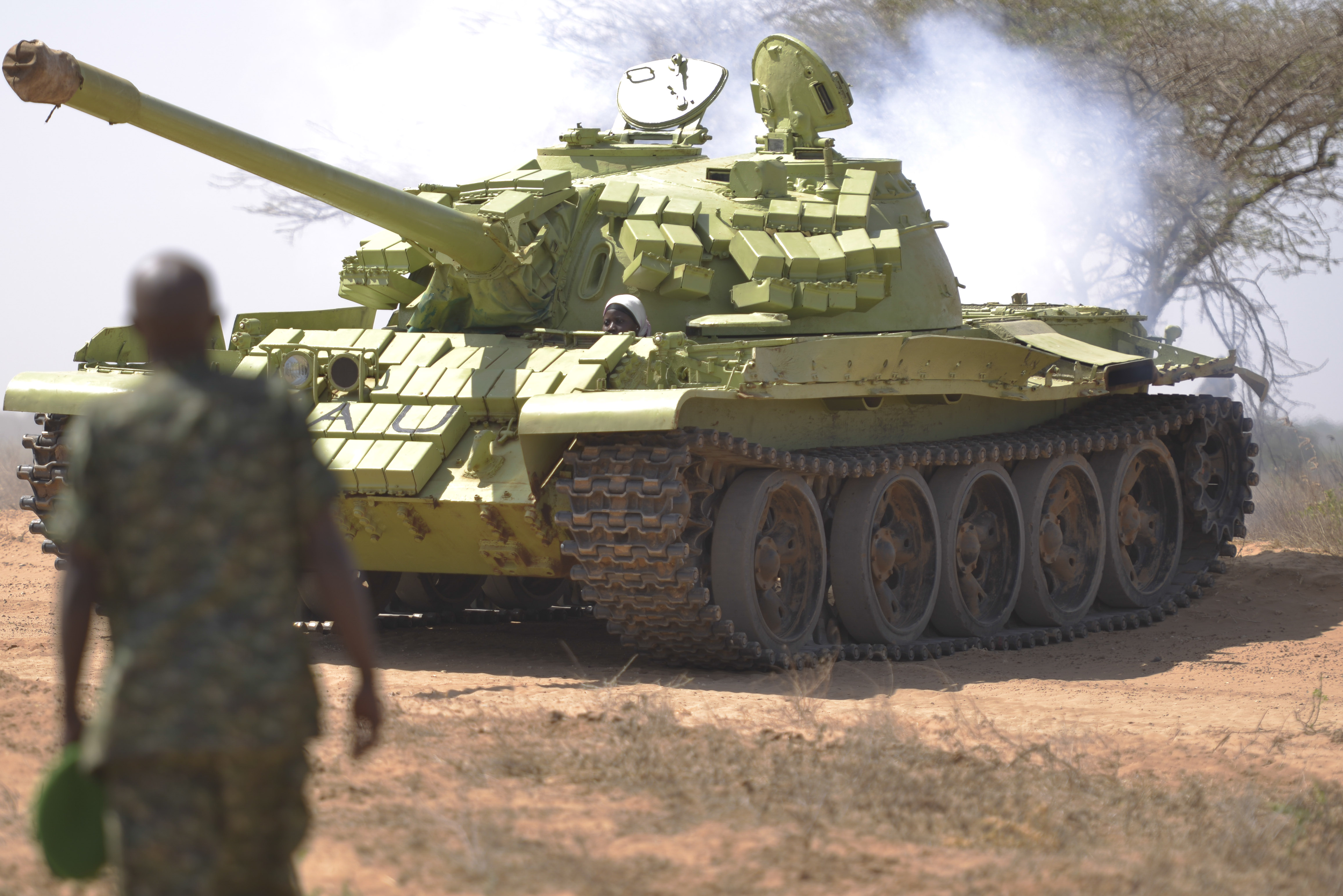
A Ugandan T-55 on deployment as part of AMISOM in 2014

The divisions are:

- First Division: Kakiri, Wakiso District.
- Second Division: Makenke Barracks, Mbarara (Brigadier Peter Elewelu). It is composed of three brigades and four auxiliary battalions, according to the website of the Ministry of Defence Uganda. This division, according to afdevinfo.com, includes the divisional headquarters at Mbarara; the 13th, 17th, 69th, 73rd, and 77th battalions; the Rwenzori Mountain Alpine Brigade; possibly another Alpine brigade; and the 3rd Tank Battalion. The division has been heavily involved with border operations since the Congo Civil War began in the 1990s. Brigadier Peter Elwelu took command in a ceremony on 17 July 2013. He had been appointed in June 2013.
- Third Division: Moroto (Brigadier Dick Olum). Before 2013, the Third Division headquarters was reported to be at Mbale.
- Fourth Division: Gulu District (Brigadier Kayanja Muhanga, until December 2016 when he took command of the Ugandan contingent with AMISOM in Somalia). James Kazini served with this division in 1996–99.
- Fifth Division: Lira (Brigadier Sam Kavuma). Created in August 2002. As of 2013, the division appears to include the 401 Brigade.
- Field Artillery Division: Masindi (Brigadier Sam Okiding, who was Ugandan Contingent Commander with AMISOM, 2015–16)
- Air Defence Division: Nakasongala (Brigadier Garvas Mugyenyi since May 2013)

=== Brigades ===
- Armoured Brigade: Kasijjagirwa Barracks, Masaka (Brigadier Joseph M. Ssemwanga)
- Motorised Infantry Brigade: Nakasongola (Brigadier Tumusiime Katsigazi). Formed in September 2002 and is composed of three motorized infantry battalions.
- 209 Brigade
- 301 Brigade
- 302 Brigade
- 303 Brigade
- 305 Brigade
- 307 Brigade, Mburamizi, Kihihi, Kanungu District. Formed in June 2001 in Ntungamo District, when it included the 69 Battalion.
- 401 Brigade, Lira/ Pader
- 403 Brigade, Kitgum, later Matany, Napak District, as a component of 3 Division
- 405 Brigade, Kotido
- 407 Brigade
- 409 Brigade, West Nile
- 503 Brigade, Gang-Dyang, Kitgum.
- 505 Brigade, Pajimu, Kitgum District, a component of 5 Division.
- 507 Alpine Brigade, Kasese.
- 509 Brigade, Pader.
- 601 Brigade

== Army equipment ==
=== Firearms ===
Small arms
Name	Image	Caliber	Type	Origin
Pistols
TT-33		7.62×25mm	Semi-automatic pistol	Soviet Union
PM		9×18mm	Semi-automatic pistol	Soviet Union
Browning Hi-Power		9×19mm	Semi-automatic pistol	Belgium
Submachine guns
Sten		9×19mm	Submachine gun	United Kingdom
Sterling		9×19mm	Submachine gun	United Kingdom
Škorpion		.32 ACP	Submachine gun	Czechoslovakia
Uzi		9×19mm	Submachine gun	Israel
Rifles
SKS		7.62×39mm	Semi-automatic rifle	Soviet Union
AKM		7.62×39mm	Assault rifle	Soviet Union
PM md. 63		7.62×39mm	Assault rifle	Socialist Republic of Romania
Type 56		7.62×39mm	Assault rifle	China
Type 81		7.62×39mm	Assault rifle	China
IMI Galil		5.56×45mm	Assault rifle	Israel
IWI Galil ACE		7.62×39mm	Assault rifle	Israel
M16		5.56×45 mm	Assault rifle	United States
M4		5.56×45mm	Carbine Assault rifle	United States
IWI Tavor		5.56×45mm	Bullpup Assault rifle	Israel
FN FAL		7.62×51mm	Battle rifle	Belgium
Heckler & Koch G3		7.62×51mm	Battle rifle	West Germany
Lee-Enfield		.303 British	Bolt-action rifle	British Empire
Sniper rifles
PSL		7.62×54mmR	Designated marksman rifle Sniper rifle	Socialist Republic of Romania
Machine guns
Bren		7.62×51mm	Light machine gun	United Kingdom
DP-27		7.62×54mmR	Light machine gun	Soviet Union
RPD		7.62×39mm	Squad automatic weapon	Soviet Union
RPK		7.62×39mm	Squad automatic weapon	Soviet Union
PKM		7.62×54mmR	General-purpose machine gun	Soviet Union
M60		7.62×51mm	General-purpose machine gun	United States
DShK		12.7×108mm	Heavy machine gun	Soviet Union
Rocket propelled grenade launchers
RPG-7		40mm	Rocket-propelled grenade	Soviet Union
RPG-2	RPG2 and PG2 TBiU 37	40mm	Rocket-propelled grenade	Soviet Union
Grenade launchers
QLZ-87		35×32mm	Automatic grenade launcher	China

=== Antitank weapons ===
Anti-tank weapons
Name	Image	Caliber	Type	Origin
9M14 Malyutka			Anti-tank weapon	Soviet Union
9M133 Kornet		1,000 Kornet-E in service.	Anti-tank weapon	Russia

=== Vehicles ===
==== Tanks ====
Tanks
Name	Image	Type	Origin	Quantity	Status
T-90S		Main battle tank	Russia	44	
T-72A/B1		Main battle tank	Soviet Union	50 (Note: 40 T-72A, 10 T-72B1)	
T-55		Medium tank	Soviet Union	140	
T-54		Medium tank	Soviet Union	140	
PT-76		Amphibious Light tank	Soviet Union	20	
Type 85-II-M		Main battle tank	China	5	

==== Armoured cars ====
Reconnaissance
Name	Image	Type	Origin	Quantity	Status
Eland-90		Armoured car	South Africa	40	
Alvis Saladin		Armored car	United Kingdom	36	

==== Infantry fighting vehicles ====
Name	Image	Type	Origin	Quantity	Status
BVP-2		Infantry fighting vehicle	Czechoslovakia (Note: Delivered from Czech Republic in 2003.)	41	
BMP-2		Infantry fighting vehicle	Soviet Union (Note: Delivered from Ukraine in 2003.)	31	

==== Armoured reconnaissance ====
Scout cars
Name	Image	Type	Origin	Quantity	Status
BRDM-2		Amphibious armored scout car	Soviet Union	100	
Daimler Ferret		Armored car Scout car	United Kingdom	15	

==== Armoured personnel carriers ====
Armored personnel carriers
Name	Image	Type	Origin	Quantity	Status
BTR-60		Amphibious Armored personnel carrier	Soviet Union	12	
OT-64 SKOT		Amphibious Armored personnel carrier	Polish People's Republic	4	
Mamba		Armored personnel carrier	South Africa	15	
RG-31 Nyala		Infantry mobility vehicle	South Africa	15	
Buffel		Infantry mobility vehicle	South Africa	20	

==== MRAPs ====
Mine-resistant ambush protected
Name	Image	Type	Origin	Quantity	Status
Casspir		MRAP	South Africa	42	INS (Note: For peacekeeping missions.)

==== Engineering vehicles ====
Engineering vehicles
Name	Image	Type	Origin	Quantity	Status
VT-55A		Armored recovery vehicle	Soviet Union; Czechoslovakia	Unknown	

==== Utility vehicles ====
Utility vehicles
Name	Image	Type	Origin	Quantity	Status
Humvee		Light utility vehicle	United States	Unknown	
Trucks
SAMIL		Utility truck	South Africa	450	
Tatra 813		Utility truck	Czechoslovakia	Unknown	
Tatra 815-7		Utility truck	Czech Republic	Unknown	

=== Artillery ===
Artillery
Name	Image	Type	Origin	Quantity	Status
Self-propelled artillery
ATMOS 2000		Self-propelled artillery	Israel	6	
Rocket artillery
BM-21 Grad		Multiple rocket launcher	Soviet Union	6	
RM-70		Multiple rocket launcher	Czechoslovakia	6	
Mortars
Type 53		Mortar	Soviet Union; China	Unknown	
Cardom		Mortar	Israel	18	
Field artillery
M-46		Field gun	Soviet Union (Note: Acquired from Bulgaria.)	8	
M-30		Howitzer	Soviet Union (Note: Acquired from Libya.)	18	

=== Air defense ===
Man-portable air-defense systems
Name	Image	Type	Origin	Quantity	Status
9K32 Strela-2		MANPADS	Soviet Union		

Towed anti-aircraft guns
Name	Image	Type	Origin	Quantity	Status
ZPU-4		Anti-aircraft gun	Soviet Union	Unknown	
ZU-23-2		Autocannon	Soviet Union	5	
61-K		Autocannon	Soviet Union	20	

Surface-to-air missile systems
Name	Image	Type	Origin	Quantity	Status
S-125 Neva		Surface-to-air missile	Soviet Union	4	
9K31 Strela-1		Surface-to-air missile	Soviet Union	Unknown	

Previous equipment included the M4 Sherman tank. SIPRI trade registers indicated transfer of at least 12 vehicles, and in 1999, another source listed 3 Shermans in service.

== Air Force ==
Uganda People's Defence Air Force roundel

The Uganda Army Air Force (UAAF) was established in 1964 with Israeli aid. Its first aircraft was consequently of Israeli origin, and its initial pilots trained in Israel. As Uganda's government forged closer links with the Eastern Bloc, the UAAF began to acquire more aircraft as well as support in training from the Soviet Union, Czechoslovakia, and Libya. Israeli aid initially continued as well.

By late 1978, the UAAF was commanded by Lieutenant Colonel Christopher Gore and consisted of several dozen CM.170R Magister, MiG-21bis, MiG-21MFs, MiG-21UMs, MiG-17Fs, and MiG-15UTIs. Some of the available aircraft were not combat-ready, however, and were abandoned during the Uganda–Tanzania War without seeing action. The lack of spare parts especially affected the MiG-15s and MiG-17s. The UAAF was split into three fighter squadrons. However the force was effectively wiped out during the 1978-1979 air campaign of the Uganda-Tanzania War.

There are conflicting reports on what aircraft the Ugandan Air Force has in service as of 2019–2020. Lieutenant General Charles Lutaaya, is the commander.

In 2011, Emmanuel Tumusiime-Mutebile, the central bank governor, caused large volatility in the Ugandan shilling when he told the Financial Times that President Museveni had ignored technical advice against using Uganda's small foreign exchange reserves to buy new Sukhoi Su-30 fighter aircraft.

=== Inventory ===
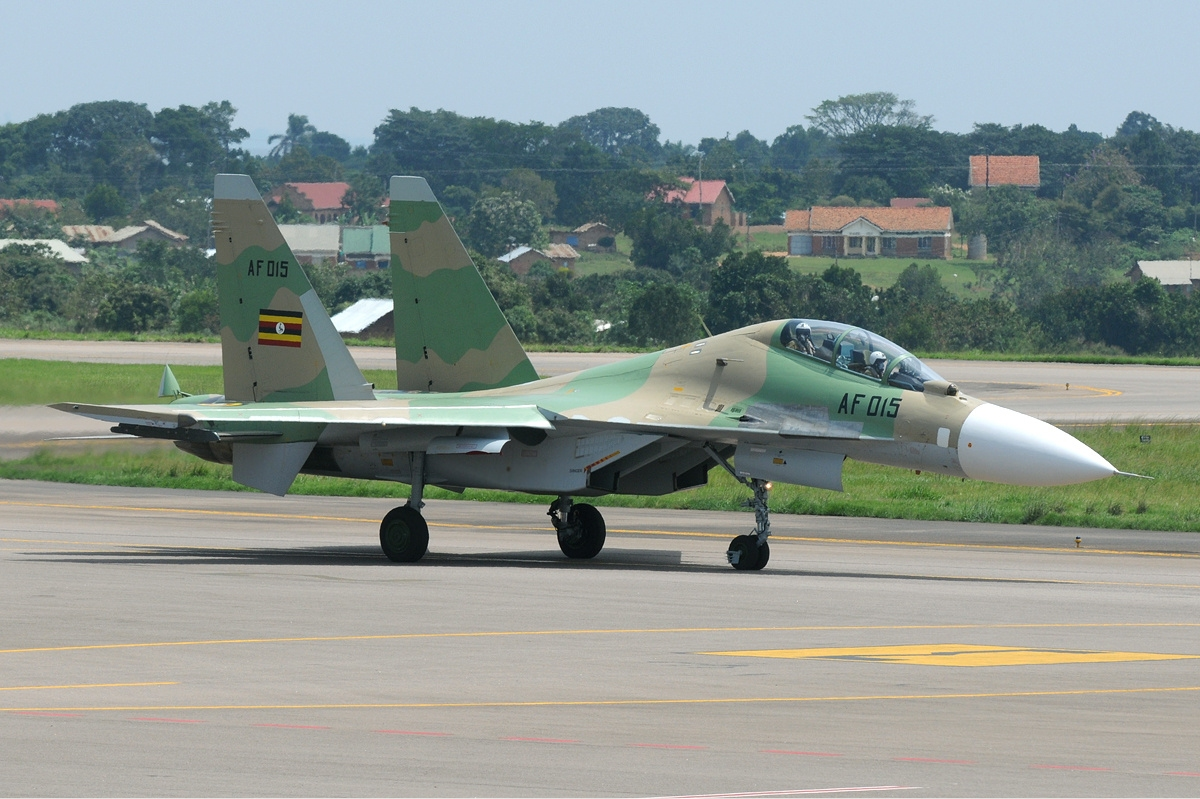
A Sukhoi Su-30MK2 taxiing

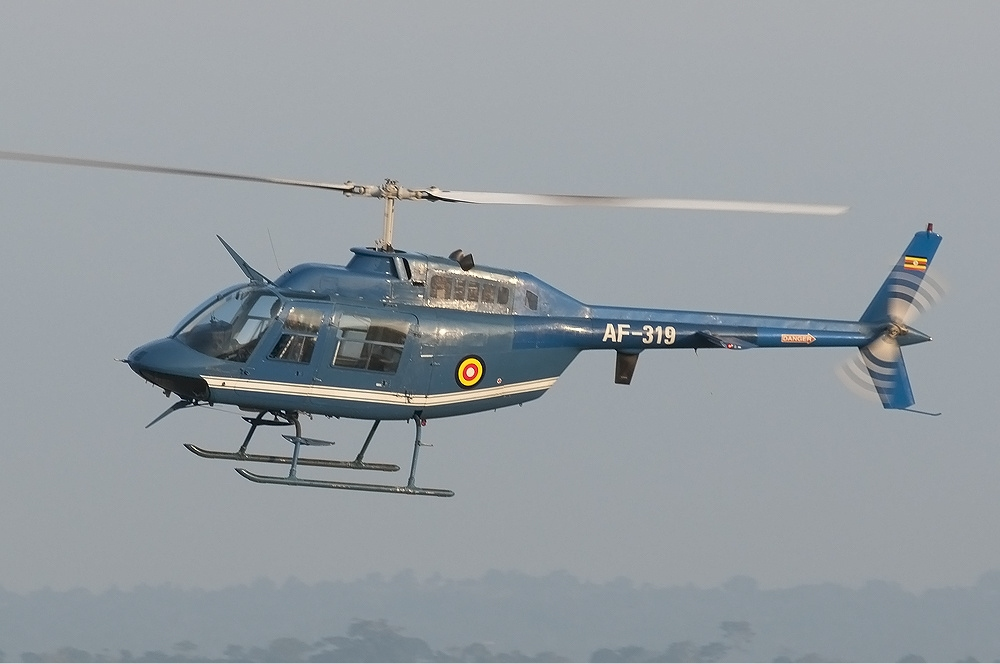
A Bell 206 helicopter landing

Aircraft	Origin	Type	Variant	In service	Notes
Combat Aircraft
MiG-21	Soviet Union	fighter	MiG-21bis	5	.
Sukhoi Su-30	Russia	multirole	Su-30MK2	5	
Transport
Cessna 208	United States	utility / transport		2	
Short Skyvan	United Kingdom	utility / transport		1	
Helicopters
Bell 206	United States	utility		5	
Bell UH-1	United States	utility	UH-1H	5	donated by the US
Mil Mi-17	Russia	utility		10	
Mil Mi-24	Russia	attack	Mi-35	5	
Mil Mi-28	Russia	attack		3+	
Trainer Aircraft
Aero L-39	Czech Republic	jet trainer	L-39ZO	8	
SIAI-Marchetti SF.260	Italy	basic trainer		4	

== See also ==
- Uganda Ministry of Defence and Veterans Affairs
- Uganda Ministry of Defence Headquarters
- Joint Anti-Terrorist Task Force of Uganda

== Bibliography ==
- "World Defence Almanac". Military Technology. XXXII (1). Bonn, Germany: Monch Publishing Group: 335. ISSN 0722-3226.
- Abbott, P. & Ruggeri, R., Modern African Wars (4): The Congo 1960–2002, Men-at-Arms Series 492, Osprey Publishing, London, 2014.
- Amii Omara-Otunnu, Politics and the Military in Uganda 1890-1985, St. Martin's Press, New York, 1987.
- Avirgan, Tony; Honey, Martha (1983). War in Uganda: The Legacy of Idi Amin. Dar es Salaam: Tanzania Publishing House. ISBN 978-9976-1-0056-3.
- Cooper, Tom, Africa@War Volume 14: Great Lakes Conflagration – The Second Congo War, 1998–2003, Helion & Co Ltd, England, and Thirty Degrees South Publishers Pty Ltd, Johannesburg, 2013.
- Cooper, Tom; Fontanellaz, Adrien (2015). Wars and Insurgencies of Uganda 1971–1994. Solihull: Helion & Company Limited. ISBN 978-1-910294-55-0.
- Oloya, Opiyo, Black Hawks Rising: The Story of AMISOM's Successful War Against Somali Insurgents 2007-2014, Helion & Co Ltd, Solihull, England, 2016. ISBN 978-1-910777-69-5
- Mudoola, Dan M. (1991). "Chapter 17: Institution-Building: The Case of the NRM and the military in Uganda 1986-89". In Hansen, Holger Bernt (ed.). Changing Uganda: The Dilemmas of Structural Adjustment and Revolutionary Change. James Currey. pp. 230–246.
- Prunier, Gérard, Africa's World War: Congo, The Rwandan Genocide and the Making of a Continental Catastrophe, Oxford University Press, London, 2009. ISBN 978-0-19-975420-5
- Seftel, Adam, ed. (2010) [1st pub. 1994]. Uganda: The Bloodstained Pearl of Africa and Its Struggle for Peace. From the Pages of Drum. Kampala: Fountain Publishers. ISBN 978-9970-02-036-2.
- International Institute for Strategic Studies (February 2016). The Military Balance 2016. Vol. 116. Routlegde. ISBN 9781857438352.
- International Institute for Strategic Studies (February 2023). The Military Balance 2023. Routledge, Chapman & Hall, Incorporated. ISBN 978-1-032-50895-5.
