= History of the Scots Guards (1946–present) =

The Scots Guards are a regiment of the British Army, renowned for their participation in ceremonial duties. These include events such as the beating retreat, the Changing of the Guard, the Queen's Birthday Parade, Remembrance Sunday, and state visits. The ceremonial uniforms of the Guards regiments differ minimally, distinguished by variations in tunic buttons, collar and shoulder badges, and the presence or absence of a plume on the bearskin. The Scots Guards' uniform features tunic buttons arranged in groups of three, the Order of the Thistle on the shoulder badge, a thistle emblem on the collar badge, and no plume on the bearskin.

During the latter half of the 20th century, the Scots Guards were deployed in conflicts linked to British colonial interests, including counterinsurgency operations in Malaya, Northern Ireland, Cyprus, and Uganda. In 1948, during the Malayan Emergency, the regiment was implicated in the Batang Kali massacre, in which 24 unarmed male civilians from a village near the Batang Kali River were executed. The victims were falsely alleged to be members of the Malayan National Liberation Army a communist insurgent group. The regiment was also involved in the fatal shooting of an unarmed 18-year-old civilian in the back during the McBride incident in Northern Ireland.

== World War II history ==
By 1946, both battalions had returned to the United Kingdom, with the 1st Battalion stationed in Germany and the 2nd Battalion in Trieste. In 1948, the 1st Battalion was redesignated as the Guards Training Battalion, a role it maintained until 1951.

== The Malayan Emergency ==
The 2nd Battalion of the Scots Guards, as part of the 2nd Guards Brigade, was deployed to Malaya in October 1948 to counter a communist-led anti-colonial uprising during the Malayan Emergency (1948–1960). The insurgents, known as the Malayan National Liberation Army (MNLA), were led by Chin Peng, a veteran anti-fascist and trade union activist. The MNLA emerged as a continuation of the Malayan Peoples' Anti-Japanese Army (MPAJA), a communist guerrilla force previously funded and trained by British forces during the Japanese occupation of Malaya in World War II.

== The Batang Kali Massacre ==
The Scots Guards were implicated in the killing of unarmed civilians and the destruction of homes during the Batang Kali massacre in Malaya in December 1948, an incident that occurred months after their deployment to counter the Malayan Emergency.

On 12 December 1948, the 2nd Battalion surrounded a rubber plantation near the Batang Kali River and detained approximately 50 villagers. Reports indicate that soldiers subjected villagers to aggressive interrogation tactics, including staged mock executions. After separating men from women and children, 24 unarmed men were killed; one survivor escaped by feigning death. The battalion subsequently burned the village, forcing the evacuation of remaining residents. Post-war investigations revealed evidence of mutilation among the victims.

The massacre has been likened to the My Lai massacre during the Vietnam War and described as "one of the most contentious episodes in British colonial history". British authorities allegedly introduced policies to shield personnel from prosecution, including legal measures retrospectively justifying lethal force against civilians.

Despite petitions from victims' families, British courts dismissed claims in 2012, citing the passage of time and jurisdictional limitations. However, they acknowledged the massacre occurred, based on survivor testimonies, regimental accounts, and declassified military records.

== The Cyprus Emergency and Suez Crisis ==
In late 1951, the 1st Battalion deployed to Cyprus as part of the 32nd Guards Brigade. In February 1952, it was redeployed to the Suez Canal Zone following the Egyptian government's abrogation of the Anglo-Egyptian treaty of 1936, which had granted Britain a military base in the region and was originally set to expire in 1956.

During its deployment in Egypt, the battalion conducted routine patrols and guard duties, which were often uneventful but occasionally involved clashes with Egyptian forces. These included sniper attacks and riots. The battalion remained stationed in the Suez Canal Zone until late 1954, when it withdrew alongside the 32nd Guards Brigade following a revised Anglo-Egyptian agreement. The treaty stipulated joint British-Egyptian technical oversight of the base and initiated a phased withdrawal of British forces, concluding with their full departure in June 1956. The battalion suffered one fatality during its deployment.

== Reorganisation, African colonialism, and Borneo ==
In 1952, following the accession of Queen Elizabeth II as the regiment's fifth Colonel-in-Chief (a role first held by King Edward VII in 1901), the Scots Guards formed a new alliance with the 3rd Battalion, The Royal Australian Regiment, which remained active as of 2004.

Between 1953 and 1960, the regiment rotated battalions through West Germany as part of the British Army of the Rhine. The 2nd Battalion deployed to Hubbelrath in July 1953, joining the 4th Guards Brigade, and returned to the UK in 1957. The 1st Battalion replaced it in Hubbelrath until 1960.

In February 1962, the 2nd Battalion deployed to Kenya, joining the 24th Infantry Brigade. During its deployment, the battalion supported civil authorities, including responding to the 1964 mutiny of the 1st Battalion, The Kenya Rifles, and dispatching a company to suppress the mutiny of the 1st Battalion, The Uganda Rifles in Uganda. The battalion returned to the UK later that year.

The regiment's alliance with Canada's Winnipeg Grenadiers, established in 1933, ended in 1964. The Winnipeg Grenadiers disbanded the following year.

In late 1964, the 1st Battalion deployed to newly formed Malaysia, stationed at Camp Terendak, Malacca, under the 28th Commonwealth Brigade. During the Indonesia–Malaysia confrontation (1963–1966), the battalion conducted two tours in Borneo in 1965, patrolling dense jungle to counter Indonesian incursions. This deployment mirrored the 2nd Battalion's counterinsurgency experiences during the Malayan Emergency (1948–1960). The battalion returned to the UK in 1966.

Meanwhile, the 2nd Battalion redeployed to West Germany in 1966, initially based in Iserlohn with the 4th Armoured Brigade before relocating to Münster the following year.

== Actions in Northern Ireland ==
In 1970, the 1st Battalion deployed to Sharjah (now part of the United Arab Emirates), returning to the UK later that year. Concurrently, the 2nd Battalion concluded its deployment in West Germany and commenced the first of multiple tours in Northern Ireland, a recurring operational focus for the regiment throughout the 1970s.

=== 1971–1974: Battalion reorganisation and early tours ===
- In 1971, the 2nd Battalion was placed in suspended animation due to defence budget reductions, retaining only two companies. It was reconstituted in 1972 following a change of government.
- The 1st Battalion undertook its inaugural deployment to Northern Ireland in 1971, conducting patrols and guard duties amid persistent threats from sniper attacks and bombings. The tour ended in December 1971 with five soldiers killed in action.
- In 1972, the 1st Battalion relocated to Münster, West Germany, with the 4th Armoured Brigade, while the reformed 2nd Battalion deployed to Northern Ireland, losing three soldiers to gunfire.
- The 1st Battalion returned to Northern Ireland from May to September 1973, followed by the 2nd Battalion later that year, which sustained one fatality from sniper fire.
- In 1974, two Scots Guards members were killed in an IRA bombing targeting pubs in Guildford, England, which also claimed the lives of two Women's Royal Army Corps personnel and a civilian, injuring dozens.

=== 1975–1981: Continued deployments ===
- The 1st Battalion completed a four-month Northern Ireland tour in 1975 without casualties, returning to Münster in August. The 2nd Battalion deployed to Belize for a five-month posting.
- In 1976, the 1st Battalion returned to the UK, while the 2nd Battalion redeployed to Münster. The latter conducted another Northern Ireland tour later that year, resuming counterinsurgency duties until January 1977.
- The 1st Battalion undertook brief Northern Ireland deployments in 1977 and 1978. During the latter tour, a 2nd Battalion soldier was killed while operating undercover with the 14th Intelligence Company.
- From March 1980 to late 1981, the 1st Battalion was stationed at Aldergrove, Northern Ireland, joined temporarily by the 2nd Battalion for a five-month tour in May 1980. The 1st Battalion subsequently transferred to Hong Kong for a two-year posting.

== Falklands War ==
Scots Guards in the Falklands War, 1982

On 2 April 1982, Argentine forces under the military dictatorship of General Leopoldo Galtieri, invaded the British overseas territory of the Falkland Islands. In response, the United Kingdom deployed a naval task force, including Royal Navy warships, Royal Fleet Auxiliaries, and requisitioned merchant vessels, to retake the islands. By 25 April, British forces had recaptured South Georgia, a disputed island near Antarctica. By 1 May, the Royal Navy's Carrier Battle Group entered the Total Exclusion Zone (TEZ), a 200-mile (370 km) maritime perimeter established around the Falklands. The 2nd Battalion, Scots Guards, part of the 5th Infantry Brigade (alongside the 1st Battalion, The Welsh Guards, and 1st/7th Duke of Edinburgh's Own Gurkha Rifles), embarked on the requisitioned liner Queen Elizabeth 2 on 12 May, departing Southampton for the South Atlantic.

On 21 May, 3 Commando Brigade (including two Parachute Regiment battalions) established a beachhead at San Carlos water during unopposed landings. The QE2 arrived near the Falklands in late May, but due to vulnerability to air attack, most of the 5th Brigade transferred to the P&O liner SS Canberra for the final approach. The Scots Guards disembarked at San Carlos via Landing Craft Utility (LCU), on 2 June, followed by deployment to Bluff Cove aboard HMS Intrepid on 5 June. On 8 June the 1st, Argentine Skyhawk aircraft struck RFA Sir Galahad and RFA Sir Tristram at Bluff Cove, killing 48 personnel (including 32 Welsh Guards) and injuring over 150, many with severe burns. Only 200 survived aboard Sir Galahad.

On 13 June, the Scots Guards were helicoptered to Goat Ridge, near their objective, Mount Tumbledown, defended by Argentina's elite 5th Marine Infantry Battalion. In the early hours of 14 June, the battalion launched a bayonet charge —one of the last in British Army history—against entrenched Argentine positions. After intense close-quarters combat, the summit was secured by 8:00 am. Casualties included 8 Scots Guards, 1 Royal Engineer, and 43 wounded; Argentine losses totalled 40 killed and 30 captured. See Battle of Mount Tumbledown. Argentine forces surrendered on 14 June, though hostilities officially ended on 20 June. Naval Party 8901 (survivors of the initial invasion) raised the Governor's flag over Government House on 15 June, ending 74 days of occupation. The Scots Guards departed the Falklands aboard MV Norland on 19 July, returning to the UK via RAF VC-10 aircraft.

=== Honours and awards ===
- Distinguished Service Order (DSO): Lieutenant-Colonel Michael Scott, (Commanding officer).
- Military Cross (MC): 2 recipients.
- Distinguished Conduct Medal (DCM): 2 recipients.
- Military Medal (MM): 2 recipients.
- Battle honours: "Tumbledown Mountain" and "Falkland Islands 1982".

== Activity in the 1980s and 1990s ==
=== 1980s deployments and exercises ===
In 1984, the 1st Battalion returned from Hong Kong, while the 2nd Battalion deployed to the Sovereign Base Area, Cyprus, remaining there until February 1986. In June 1984, the 1st Battalion participated in the Queen's Birthday Parade, marking the final occasion Queen Elizabeth II rode on horseback during the ceremony. The battalion later undertook an emergency tour of Northern Ireland from September 1986 to January 1987, during which it received new Colours from the Queen at Buckingham Palace. Meanwhile, the 2nd Battalion conducted a routine Northern Ireland deployment from October 1987 to February 1988.

In 1988, the 1st Battalion relocated to Hohne, West Germany, joining the 22nd Armoured Brigade, while the 2nd Battalion participated in a six-week mechanised infantry exercise at the British Army Training Unit Suffield (BATUS) in Canada. The 2nd Battalion was also presented with new Colours by the Queen at Hopetoun House, Edinburgh, later that year. The 1st Battalion undertook a four-month emergency deployment to East Tyrone, Northern Ireland, in 1989, while the 2nd Battalion returned to BATUS for further exercises.

=== 1990s operations ===
The 1st Battalion began the 1990s with a six-week BATUS exercise in Canada and transitioned from FV432 armoured personnel carriers to Warrior APCs. In March 1990, the 2nd Battalion deployed to Northern Ireland, suffering one fatality during its tour.

In November 1990, the Regimental Band of the Scots Guards, under Lieutenant Colonel Price, deployed to the Persian Gulf as part of Operation Granby (the UK's contribution to the Gulf War). The band served as medics at 33 Field Hospital in Kuwait and performed ceremonial duties. The 1st Battalion also deployed to the Gulf, earning the theatre honour "Gulf 1991".

In 1992, the 2nd Battalion provided the Royal Guard at Balmoral Castle and participated in the Edinburgh Military Tattoo. The regiment celebrated its 350th anniversary at Holyrood Palace. The 2nd Battalion was placed in suspended animation in November 1993 due to defence cuts, retaining only F Company for ceremonial duties.

The 1st Battalion conducted a six-month Northern Ireland tour in 1994, followed by exercises at BATUS in 1995 and another deployment to Northern Ireland in 1996. From 1998 to 2000, the battalion was stationed at Abercorn Barracks, Ballykinler, Northern Ireland.

=== The McBride shooting ===
Guardsmen Wright and Fisher who were convicted of the murder of a civilian during the 1992 tour of Northern Ireland.

During the 1st Battalion's 1992 deployment to Belfast, two soldiers—Guardsmen Mark Wright and James Fisher—shot and killed 18-year-old Peter McBride, an unarmed civilian, on 4 September. Despite being cleared during a search, McBride fled and was shot twice in the back. Frightened by the confrontation, McBride ran from the Guardsmen, who responded by shooting him in the back. Seriously wounded, McBride collapsed across a car and slid to the ground, where he was again shot in the back.

In 1995, Wright and Fisher were convicted of murder and sentenced to life imprisonment. Under the Good Friday Agreement (1998), both were released early and controversially reinstated into the Army, contravening Queen's Regulations requiring dismissal for custodial sentences. The decision drew widespread criticism, including from Belfast Lord Mayor Martin Morgan, and sparked ongoing protests from McBride's family.

== Dawn of a new millennium ==
=== Early 2000s deployments and ceremonial duties ===
In 2000, the 1st Battalion, Scots Guards deployed to Northern Ireland, followed by a six-week training exercise in Kenya. A contingent also operated in Sierra Leone, West Africa, as part of international stabilisation efforts. The battalion returned to Northern Ireland in 2001, with one company remaining for a six-month posting.

Following the death of Queen Elizabeth The Queen Mother in March 2002, the regiment played a prominent role in her funeral. On 5 April, 306 personnel participated in the procession to Westminster Hall, where her coffin lay in state until 9 April. Officers maintained a vigil throughout this period. Later that month, the 1st Battalion and F Company received new Colours from Queen Elizabeth II at Windsor Castle. The battalion also participated in the Queen's Birthday Parade, marking both the monarch's Golden Jubilee (50th reign anniversary) and the regiment's 360th anniversary. Additionally, the Scots Guards supported Operation Fresco during the 2002–2003 firefighters' strike, operating Green Goddess fire engines in Greater London.

=== Operational deployments and reforms ===
In 2003, the 1st Battalion relocated to Münster, Germany, under British Forces Germany (BFG) for a six-year posting. F Company concurrently conducted military exercises in Kazakhstan. The battalion deployed to Iraq in 2004 as part of the 4th Armoured Brigade, joining the Multi-National Division (South East), to provide security in southeastern Iraq until UK command transferred to the United States in 2009.

Under the 2004 British Army reforms, the Scots Guards retained a single battalion structure and were redesignated as an armoured infantry battalion. In 2009, the battalion moved from Münster to Catterick, North Yorkshire. In 2011, it resumed public duties for the first time in decades, trooping its Queen's Colour during the Queen's Birthday Parade. Elements of the battalion temporarily relocated to Pirbright for this purpose.

=== Modernisation and reorganisation ===
In 2021, the 1st Battalion shifted to Somme Barracks, Catterick Garrison, as part of the Army 2020 Refine restructuring. On 1 May 2022 (delayed from 1 April), A (The London Scottish) Company of the London Regiment was redesignated as G (Messines) Company, Scots Guards, forming part of the 1st Battalion London Guards.
