= Ministry of Defence and Veterans Affairs (Uganda) =

Government ministry of Uganda

Coordinates: 00°19′36″N 32°37′53″E

- Coat of Arms of Uganda

Ministry overview
- Type: Ministry
- Jurisdiction: Government of Uganda
- Headquarters: Chwa II Road, Mbuya; Kampala, Uganda
- Ministry executives: Jacob Markson Oboth, Minister of Defence and Veterans Affairs; Sarah Mateke Nyirabashitsi, State Mister of Defence and Veterans Affairs
- Website: Homepage

The Ministry of Defence and Veterans Affairs (MODVA) is a government ministry responsible for the national defence and security of Uganda. In this capacity, its role is to preserve, defend and protect the people, property, sovereignty and territorial integrity of Uganda, contributing to regional stability and supporting international peace initiatives.

== History ==
During the colonial days, the national defence forces were named King's African Rifles (KAR). Later the name changed to Uganda Rifles (UR) and then Uganda Army (UA). The force that fought the Uganda Bush War, from 8 February 1981 to 26 January 1986, was called the National Liberation Army. In 1995, when a new constitution was promulgated, the name was changed to Uganda People's Defence Forces (UPDF).

== Location ==
The headquarters of the ministry are located in the Mbuya Military Barracks, on Chwa II Road, in the Nakawa Division of the city of Kampala, Uganda's capital and largest city.

== Overview ==
The ministry oversees the UPDF. This ensures that the UPDF is ultimately answerable to the people of Uganda, while it remains professional, with focus on protecting its citizens, defending national sovereignty and contributing to regional stability.

=== Command ===
- Defence Minister: Vicent Bamulangaki Sempijja
- State Minister for Defence: Oboth Oboth Markson
- Chief of Defence Forces: Gen. Muhoozi Kainerugaba
- Deputy Chief of Defence Forces: Lt. Gen. Peter Elwelu
- Joint Chief of Staff: Maj. Gen. Leopold Kyanda
- Service Chiefs
  - Land Forces Commander: Maj. General Kayanja Muhanga (since October 2022)
  - Land Forces Chief of Staff: Bob Ogik (since December 2016)
  - Air Force Commander: Lt. General Charles Lwanga Lutaaya (since January 2017)
  - Special Forces Command Commander: brig gen peter onzi chandia (since December 2020)
  - Reserve Forces Commander: Lt. General Charles Otema (since January 2017)
  - UPDF Marine Forces Commander: Brig Gen Micheal Nyarwa
- Headquarters Staff
  - Chief of personnel & administration': Brig. Gen. Eugenie Ssebugwawo
  - Chief of military intelligence: Major General James Birungi
  - Chief of training and recruitment: Brigadier General Mathew Gureme
  - Chief of logistics and engineering: Brigadier Charles Bakahumura (since January 2017)
  - Chief of communications and information technology: Brigadier Michael Bossa (June 2016)
  - Chief of communications and information: Colonel Victor Twesigye
  - Chief political commissar: Major General Henry Masiko (since January 2017)
  - Chief controller of finance: Colonel Baguma Mugume
  - Chief of civil-military relations: Brigadier Gen. Rwashande
  - Chief of doctrine: Lt. General Pecos Kutesa
  - Chief of legal services: Brigadier Gen. Dr. Godard Busingye
  - Chief of production: Brigadier Jacob Musajjawaza
  - Chief of records: Colonel Arthur Musinguzi
  - Commander of military police: Maj. Gen. Don Naabasa
  - Director of medical services: Maj. Gen.Ambrose Musinguzi
  - General court martial: Brig. Gen Robert Freeman Mugabe
  - Chief of pensions and gratuity: Colonel Metland Bitumbika
  - Commissioner National Secretariat of Patriotism Corps: Brigadier General Patrick Mwesigye

=== Organisational structure ===
Administratively, the ministry is organised into three departments: the Department of Administration, Department of Finance, and Department of Logistics. The Permanent Secretary is the Chief Executive and Chief Accounting Officer for the entire ministry.

== Leadership ==
The ministry is headed by a cabinet minister. The Minister of Defence, since an April 2024, is Jacob Markson Oboth.

=== List of ministers ===
- Milton Obote (13 April 1962 – 23 May 1965)
- Felix Kenyi Onama (23 May 1965 – 2 February 1971)
- Idi Amin (2 February 1971 – 16 June 1971)
- Charles Oboth Ofumbi (16 June 1971 – 28 August 1973)
- Francis Nyangweso (28 August 1973 – 27 February 1974)
- Idi Amin (27 February 1974 – 12 July 1975)
- Mustafa Adrisi (12 July 1975 – 8 May 1978)
- Paulo Muwanga (December 1980 – July 1985)
- Crispus Kiyonga (1 June 2006 – 6 June 2016)
- Adolf Mwesige (6 June 2016 – 8 June 2021)
- Vincent Ssempijja (8 June 2021 – 4 April 2024)
- Jacob Markson Oboth (4 April 2024 – present)

== See also ==
- Uganda People's Defence Force
- Cabinet of Uganda
- Parliament of Uganda
- Uganda Ministry of Defence Headquarters
