= Battle of Birembo =

1985 battle of the Ugandan Bush War

Coordinates: 0.92°S 31.16°E

- Part of the Ugandan Bush War
- Battle of Birembo (Uganda)
Date	10 January 1985
Location	Birembo, Kakumiro District, Uganda
Result	National Resistance Movement victory

Belligerents
Uganda; North Korea	National Resistance Movement

Commanders and leaders
John Charles Ogole; Eric Odwar	Yoweri Museveni; Salim Saleh

Units involved
UNLA: Special Brigade; North Korean advisors	National Resistance Army: Mobile Brigade

Casualties and losses
Several killed	5+ killed, several missing
- Several civilians killed

The Battle of Birembo (10 January 1985) was fought between National Resistance Movement (NRM) rebels and the Ugandan government, supported by North Korean forces, during the late Ugandan Bush War. In the clash, the government forces were almost able to encircle a strong insurgent force which included the NRM chief commander, Yoweri Museveni, but ultimately could not prevent a successful rebel breakout.

The battle took place after the NRM's armed wing, the National Resistance Army (NRA), had successfully raided Kabamba and carried off important military supplies. The Ugandan government sent a strong force of Uganda National Liberation Army (UNLA) soldiers to pursue and destroy the NRA raiders. The UNLA force, led by John Charles Ogole, caught up with the rebels at Birembo. Aided by heavy artillery fire, the government troops launched a surprise attack and almost encircled the rebels. However, the NRA troops were able to break through and successfully retreated during the night. They continued to evaded their pursuers over the following days and reached rebel-held territories. Alongside other unsuccessful clashes, the Battle of Birembo undermined the morale of UNLA, contributing to the 1985 Ugandan coup d'état and the NRM/NRA's takeover in Uganda in 1986.

== Background ==
In April 1979 Tanzanian forces and the Uganda National Liberation Army (UNLA), a coalition of armed rebel groups united under the Uganda National Liberation Front (UNLF), invaded Uganda and deposed the President, Idi Amin. A new UNLF government was installed, but it was weak and exercised little control over the country. This was in part due to the UNLF's and its army's own internal divisions. One of the most important rivalries emerged between the supporters of Milton Obote and Yoweri Museveni. Over time power shifted to pro-Obote elements in the government and the army. Obote assumed power in 1980 through a disputed election, and ruled through repressive methods, including the incarceration and killing of dissidents. In February 1981 Museveni and a small band of rebels began attacking UNLA forces, entering the Ugandan Bush War. Shortly thereafter a new rebel coalition was organised as the National Resistance Movement (NRM). Museveni was made vice-chairman of the National Resistance Council, the group's political body, and Chairman of the High Command of the National Resistance Army (NRA), the Movement's armed organ.

The NRA mainly operated in the Luwero Triangle west of Uganda's capital Kampala. Knowing that his force was far smaller and not well equipped, Museveni envisioned that the NRA would wage a long-term "people's war" to gradually undermine Obote's government and build up support across Uganda, starting with the Luwero region where many civilians were already sympathetic to his cause. Over the next years, fighting between the NRA and UNLA ebbed and flowed, as the government would launch major counterinsurgency operations in the Luwero Triangle, disrupting NRA activities, only for the rebels to retake lost territory upon the end of the offensives.

== Prelude ==
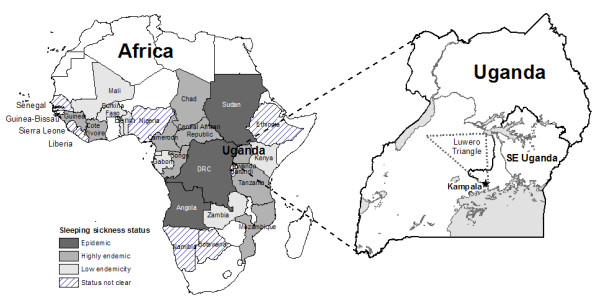
Map of Uganda, showcasing the approximate area of the Luwero Triangle.

In early 1984, the NRA won a number of victories over the security forces, most importantly raiding the cities of Masindi and Hoima. Emboldened, Museveni decided to launch another attack on Kabamba, site of a barracks and weapons depot. The NRA had already unsuccessfully attempted raids on the locality before, most notably in 1981. Unlike the previous attacks, the Third Battle of Kabamba on 1 January 1985 resulted in the capture of the depot by the NRA's Mobile Brigade under Salim Saleh. A UNLA force tried to pursue, but was fended off by the insurgents who subsequently withdrew with much loot.

The Mobile Brigade began to move toward the NRA's headquarters at Bulemezi County to reunite with the rest of the rebel army. On the way, the insurgent force had to cross Kikwaya sub-county, Kakumiro District. The local population was supportive, with one local, Kaloli Kamanyire, providing the rebels with food, intelligence, and even bribing UNLA soldiers to free captured rebels so that they could join Salim Saleh's retreating unit. The Mobile Brigade eventually stopped and rested for two days at the River Nguse, waiting for the arrival of another NRA column which had been personally commanded by Museveni. This group had been active in Bukomero to distract UNLA from the Kabamba raid.

Meanwhile, UNLA high command had decided that it had to react to the plundering of Kabamba, with Brigadier Smith Opon Acak reportedly being "furious" at the defeat. He ordered a major UNLA contingent to search and destroy the rebels. The pursuing force mainly consisted of the UNLA's Special Brigade, formed by well-trained veterans of the northern frontline of the Bush War, and was equipped with anti-aircraft guns, Katyusha rocket launchers, and 120mm mortars. In addition, the contingent was supported by North Korean soldiers who manned some of the artillery pieces including the Katyusha rocket launchers. At the time, North Korea was supportive of Obote's government and had sent over one hundred security, intelligence, and military advisors to Uganda. The UNLA pursuit contingent was headed by Lieutenant Colonel John Charles Ogole. Ogole was regarded as one of the UNLA's most talented and successful commanders, though historians Tom Cooper and Adrien Fontanellaz argued that he was not innovative regarding tactics. In addition to Ogole, Lieutenant Colonel Eric Odwar was also involved in the UNLA operation.

Based on reports by his intelligence, Ogole located the rebel force near the River Nguse, and also concluded that Museveni would be among them. Accordingly, he saw this as an opportunity to not just destroy a major rebel force, but also eliminate the NRM's leader. The NRA eventually became aware of the approach of Ogole's forces, but it was initially unclear whether they had located the Mobile Brigade or were just passing through the area. The insurgents sent smaller units led by Patrick Lumumba Ruyondo and Geoffrey Taban to monitor the UNLA force's movements and divert them to another area. Museveni's column linked up with the Mobile Brigade on 9 January. The NRA chairman considered the camp in the river's valley unsafe. Thus, the reunited NRA force relocated to Birembo in the early hours of 10 January. There, Museveni decided that the NRA forces should take up position at the local primary school. The rebel commanders believed that Birembo Primary School was a favorable and defensible position, as it was located on a hill. By the time Salim Saleh and the other officers became aware that Ogole's contingent was actually trying to encircle them at Birembo, many NRA fighters including Museveni himself were gathering food from the area's peasants.

== Battle ==
As the rebels were talking to locals or cooking, Ogole concentrated his forces on Kibojana Hill, overlooking Birembo. At 10 a.m. or 3 p.m. on 10 January, (Note: Most sources, including Yoweri Museveni, agree that the Battle of Birembo happened on 10 January 1985. However, in the first edition of his autobiography Museveni claimed that the battle took place on 8 January 1985. According to Cooper and Fontanellaz, the battle was fought on 12 January.) the government forces began to bombard Birembo. At this point, the NRA camp was "more or less surrounded". The situation was critical, and the NRA high command reportedly fell into a state of temporary chaos. (Note: Besides Yoweri Museveni, Salim Saleh, and Kizza Besigye, the rebel leadership at Birembo included David Sejusa, Joram Mugume, Steven Kashaka, Pecos Kuteesa, Julius Chihandae, Ronald Bata, Patrick Lumumba Ruyondo, and Geoffrey Kyabihende.) Yoweri Museveni and several of his bodyguards were in the open near the house of a farmer Erimegio Ssekyanzi, opposite the school, as the artillery fire began. Meanwhile, Salim Saleh and the other officers attempted to find a route to evacuate their forces from the position before they became completely encircled. The rebels scattered and took cover, but soon became scared at the intensity of the shelling. One bomb hit the NRA's ad-hoc field hospital, killing several wounded and almost hitting the rebels' chief combat medic, Kizza Besigye. Another shell fell close to Museveni, killing his lead bodyguard. Several civilians were also killed during the bombardment.

After 40 minutes of shelling, UNLA infantry teams assaulted the rebel positions. The government troops were repulsed by the NRA fighters, but the rebels' position remained precarious. The rebel leadership sent out small groups to probe the enemy lines, and it was eventually decided that the rebels would try to break out in staggered groups in the night: After initial advance teams cleared the way, the NRA high command would leave, gradually followed by other rebel teams. In this way, the leadership would be most likely be able to survive, with less essential fighters serving as rearguard. From 7 p.m., heavy rain disrupted the combat, and one hour later, the rebel force began withdrawing under the cover of darkness. Most of the NRA fighters were able to break out, and they were also able to carry their loot and weaponry to safety.

At least five rebels were killed at Birembo, and several went missing. The government force also lost several soldiers in the battle.

== Analysis ==
Journalist Gillian Nantume later described the Battle of Birembo as one of the Bush War's "longest and fiercest battles between the guerrillas and the UNLA" and a "turning point in the war". Despite the NRA's narrow escape, the clash was described by historian Timothy J. Stapleton as a defeat for the UNLA. Museveni would also argue that the battle had been decisive, as it had showcased to UNLA soldiers that the NRA's ability to fight was increasing, not declining, contributing to a deterioration of morale among government forces.

== Aftermath ==
After the NRA retreat, the UNLA soldiers occupied Birembo. They burnt some of the rebel dead, destroyed the homes of some locals, and looted property. The NRA continued to successfully evade the UNLA troops, ambushing smaller units of government troops and repulsing more attacks including a major one at Kirema. The UNLA forces subsequently ended their pursuit, allowing the NRA troops to successfully reach rebel-held territories and reorganize. Expoliting the successes at Kabamba, Birembo, and Kirema, the NRA expanded its operations from March 1985. The rebels opened a second front in the Rwenzori Mountains, using the opportunity to also relocate wounded fighters as well as supportive civilians to less dangerous areas.

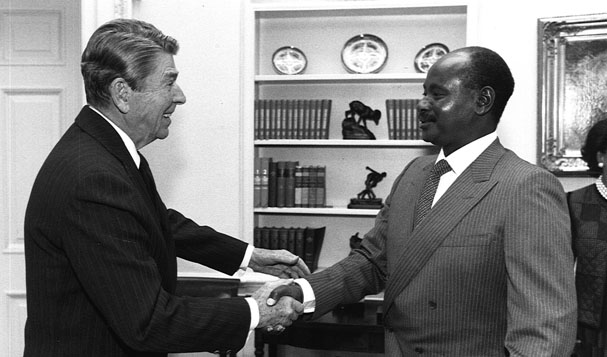
Yoweri Museveni with Ronald Reagan at the White House in October 1987

When the NRA inflicted another defeat on a major UNLA force in the Battle of Kembogo of June 1985, the government soldiers became increasingly frustrated at the Bush War's course and Obote's leadership. On 27 July, several officers of the UNLA launched a coup which overthrew President Obote. General Tito Okello assumed power in his place. The new regime was weak and unstable, and Okello made overtures to anti-Obote rebel groups to form a coalition government and end the fighting. The coup upset many Lango soldiers, which constituted the second-largest ethnic group in the UNLA and were loyal to Obote. The NRM was highly critical of the new government and accused the UNLA of committing atrocities. The UNLF, conscious of its weakening political position, nevertheless pursued negotiations with the NRM. The NRA took advantage of the disruption caused by the coup to further build up its strength.

In August 1985, the NRA launched a series of co-ordinated attacks that resulted in the capture of significant amounts of territory in central and western Uganda. In January 1986, the NRA captured Kampala, allowing the NRM to assume government power and Museveni to become Ugandan President.

A war memorial was later built in Birembo.
