= War in Uganda (1986–1994) =

Period of mass insurgency in Uganda between 1986 and 1994

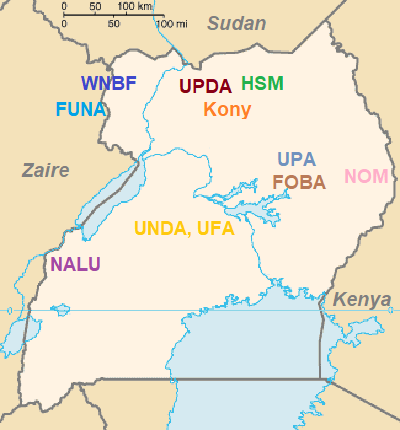
- Rebel groups during the 1986–1994 war.
Date	March 1986 – February 1994 (conflict enters new phase from 1994)
Location	Northern, eastern, central, and western Uganda
Result	Ugandan government mostly suppresses rebel activity: UPDA, HSM, UPA, FOBA and UNDA mostly or completely defeated; Some rebel groups, including the LRA, continue their insurgencies

Belligerents
Uganda (NRM government); NRA; Local Defence Units (LDU); Arrow Boys; Supported by: North Korea	UPDA; UPA; HSM (Auma); HSM (Lukoya); HSM (Ojuk); UUGM; HSM (Kony), UHSA, UPDCA, LA, LRA; FOBA; NALU; WNBF; FUNA; UNDA, UFA; NOM; Tablighi Jamaat militants (including UMFF); Supported by: Zaire (only western rebels); Kenya (Note: Kenya was accused by the Ugandan government of supporting Ugandan rebels. In addition, border clashes between the two countries took place in 1987 and 1989.); Sudan

Commanders and leaders
Yoweri Museveni; Fred Rwigyema; David Tinyefuza	Justine Odong Latek † (UPDA, UHSA, UPDCA); Eric Otema-Allimadi (UPDA); Peter Otai (UPA); Francis "Hitler" Eregu (UPA); Alice Auma (HSM); Severino Lukoya (POW) (HSM); Philip Ojuk (HSM); Otunu Lukonyomoi † (UUGM); Joseph Kony (HSM/UHSA/UPDCA/LA/LRA); Amon Bazira † (NALU); Juma Oris (WNBF); Sam Luwero (UNDA); Charles Barau (UFA)

Strength
20,000 (1986); 90,000 (1992)	UPDA: 15,000–Tens of thousands (1986) c. 3,000 (1988, NRA estimate); HSM (Auma): 7,000–10,000 (Jan. 1987); Kony's force: 1,000–Thousands (1988) c. 300 (mid-1993)

Casualties and losses
- High civilian losses

From 1986 to 1994, a variety of rebel groups waged a civil war against the Ugandan government of President Yoweri Museveni. Most of the fighting took place in the country's north and east, although the western and central regions were also affected. The most important insurgent factions were the Uganda People's Democratic Army (UPDA), the Uganda People's Army (UPA), Alice Auma's Holy Spirit Movement (HSM), and Joseph Kony's army (which later became the Lord's Resistance Army). Several smaller rebel factions and splinter groups of the larger movements waged their own campaigns; the rebels often clashed with each other. All belligerents, including the government, targeted civilians and committed human rights violations. In course of fighting that involved tens of thousands of troops, the Ugandan government was able to gradually defeat or contain most rebel factions. The operations in the north and east caused great destruction and resulted in high civilian casualties.

By 1994, the HSM and UPDA had disintegrated, the UPA had been reduced to small splinter groups, and Joseph Kony and his forces were at least weakened. However, the situation in the entire region drastically shifted in that year, as outside powers intervened and began to fund insurgencies to topple Museveni. In turn, Uganda was drawn into cross-border conflicts in Zaire and Sudan. These developments resulted in a resurgence of insurgent activity in northern Uganda. Several groups which emerged during the 1986–1994 conflict, including Kony's Lord's Resistance Army, continue their insurgencies to the present day.

== Background ==
After its independence in 1962, Uganda had fallen under a succession of authoritarian regimes, suffered from economic crises, and experienced several military conflicts. In 1979, Ugandan President Idi Amin was overthrown during the Uganda–Tanzania War, followed by the return to power by ex-President Milton Obote. Parts of Amin's Uganda Army and various anti-Obote groups consequently launched rebellions, resulting in the highly destructive Ugandan Bush War. Obote was toppled by elements of his army, the UNLA, in 1985, resulting in the formation of a regime led by Tito Okello. Although the new military leadership succeeded in convincing some rebel groups to join a coalition government, one rebel group was strongly opposed to compromise. Led by Yoweri Museveni, the National Resistance Movement (NRM) and its armed wing, the National Resistance Army (NRA), intended to achieve a full military victory and exploited the chaos after Obote's overthrow to seize large swaths of southwestern Uganda. The NRA included a large number of ethnic Tutsi who belonged to Rwandan refugee families. As a result of international pressure, the NRM signed to the "Nairobi Agreement", a peace treaty negotiated under the oversight of Kenyan President Daniel arap Moi on 17 December 1985.

The NRA quickly reneged on its promise, breaking the truce with Okello's government by launching several successful offensive operations. President Moi regarded the NRM's failure to uphold the treaty a personal insult, and consequently developed a deep resentment toward the NRM in general and Museveni in particular. After defeating the UNLA and its allies in a series of major battles, the NRA conquered Uganda's capital Kampala, in January 1986. Museveni was declared the country's new president and the NRA became the new national army. Okello's coalition government subsequently collapsed. Regardless, the UNLA continued its resistance in eastern and northern Uganda. UNLA officers appealed to civilians in the north to take up arms and join their cause, claiming that the NRA would kill everyone. If volunteers failed to emerge, civilians were simply rounded up and forcibly conscripted. The NRA had defeated the remaining UNLA units by March 1986, whereupon the latter fully disintegrated. Many UNLA fighters did not surrender, however, but hid their weaponry. A number of senior UNLA officers also retreated into Sudan, taking weaponry and recruits with them to continue the war.

In addition, many people in northern and eastern Uganda distrusted the NRA. The UNLA and allied forces, mostly ethnic Acholi and Langi from the north, had committed many war crimes in the south during the Bush War. Northerners feared that the NRA might want to take brutal revenge on the north's population. The NRM and NRA actually increased such worries through their statements, traditions, and propaganda. The NRM/NRA leadership had occasionally used racist rhetoric in regards to their northern opponents during the Bush War. Many southerners, including NRM/NRA members, regarded the northerners as primitive and even considered them non-Ugandan foreigners. Despite official condemnations by Museveni's newly formed government, the NRM takeover resulted in cases of mistreatment and murders of northerners in the south. In turn, many Acholi felt bitter about Museveni having reneged on the Nairobi Agreement and overthrowing Tito Okello who had been the country's first President of Acholi ethnicity.

== History ==
=== Growing unrest ===
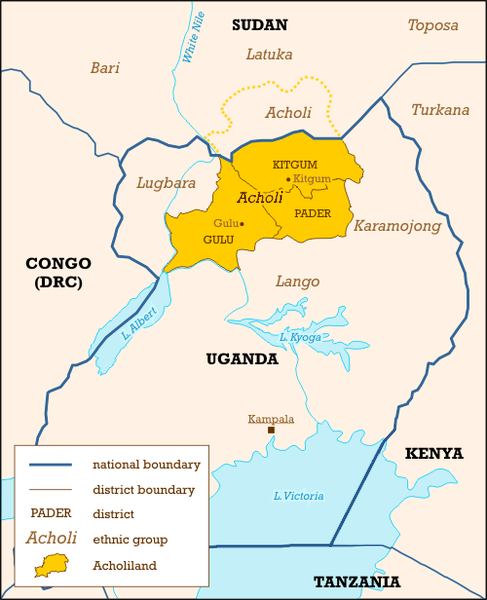
Acholiland, one of the areas most affected by warfare from 1986

In the months before and after the capture of Kampala, the NRA greatly expanded in size by recruiting thousands of new troops as well as defected troops formerly loyal to UNLA and other militant factions. In some cases, entire units were simply renamed and then integrated into the NRA, even keeping their commanders. For much of the Bush War, the NRA had maintained relatively high standards in discipline, training, and indoctrination, but the mass expansion resulted in it becoming a much more heterogeneous force. This gravely impacted the NRA as it began to secure territory captured from the UNLA in Uganda's east and north.

After UNLA had fully collapsed in March 1986, the NRA began counter-insurgency operations to eliminate groups which had refused to lay down arms. At first, the NRA encountered little opposition in former UNLA centers such as Acholiland and Teso. Many locals were surprised that the NRA soldiers behaved relatively well, and many ex-UNLA troops felt secure enough to return to their homes. The NRA also encountered little resistance in the West Nile region of northwestern Uganda. Tired of the constant war, the local elders convinced most local militants to peacefully surrender and cooperate with Museveni's government. One West Nile armed group, the UNRF (I), had even agreed to a favorable deal with the NRM, integrating its fighters into the NRA.

However, the situation began to quickly deteriorate in the north for several reasons: Acholiland and Teso had been heavily dependent on the UNLA, as the regions were poor and the soldiers' wages had supported the regions' economies. As most UNLA soldiers lost their jobs, the regions experienced economic chaos. In addition, the NRM government decided to disband many local militias which had guarded communities against cattle-raiders, mostly Karamojong groups. The NRM feared that the self-defense groups might turn into rebels. Without the militias' aid, the NRA proved unable to keep raiding in check, resulting in northern and eastern pastoral communities being devastated. Many demobilized UNLA veterans were also no longer willing to work as peasants and integrate into the civilian life, instead turning to banditry and worsening the economic unrest. The NRM attempted to co-opt local leadership in the north and east through a decentralised system of local administration, using "resistance councils" (RC). However, local elites factually lost their old power in the new NRM-dominated government. This prompted many to retreat into rural areas, where they spread their beliefs and grievances.

One of the earliest insurgencies emerged in Teso during this time. As early as January 1986, local leaders prepared for an uprising. Led by Nelson Omwero and Charles Korokoto, they organized a rebel group known as "Force Obote Back Army" or "Force Obote Back Again" (FOBA). However, FOBA quickly began to lose popular support and to splinter after beginning its uprising.

Faced with worsening security conditions due to latent militant attacks and banditry, the NRA garrisons in Gulu, Kitgum, and Teso districts became increasingly repressive. One NRA unit, the 35th Battalion, particularly tarnished the NRA's reputation through excessive behavior such as arbitrary arrests and torture of civilians. The 35th Battalion was one of the units mostly formed from non-NRA fighters, in this case ex-UFM rebels. Besides the undisciplined troops, the ethnic Tutsi troops in the NRA – who had suffered from discrimination and pogroms in the past – also proved prone to excessive violence. The increasingly brutal behavior of the NRA widened the existing rift between the NRM government and the northerners. When the government ordered all ex-UNLA soldiers to report and hand over their weapons to the NRA in May 1986, the locals consequently believed that this was a ploy to massacre all ex-UNLA forces. The tone of the radio announcement of the disarmament order was "widely" perceived as threatening, causing further unrest. The NRA then launched a gun-collection campaign in Acholiland, but many undisciplined NRA soldiers used the opportunity to harass and steal from the locals, claiming to take back everything "stolen" from southern Uganda during the Bush War. The scale of the abuses was unprecedented in the area, even compared to the situation under previous regimes. The latter had often mistreated the local elites and townspeople, but left the poor and rural mostly alone. A growing number of ex-UNLA soldiers were also arrested on suspicions of weapon ownership or anti-government activities. Most ex-combatants consequently opted to flee into the bush rather than following the order, providing recruits for emerging rebel groups. Ex-Brigadier Justine Odong Latek organized a meeting of ex-UNLA soldiers at Koch-Goma, and began to plan an uprising. In July 1986, around three-quarters of the police force were discharged, fuelling fears that the NRM government might want to punish all those who had worked for the old security forces.

=== Escalation in the north ===
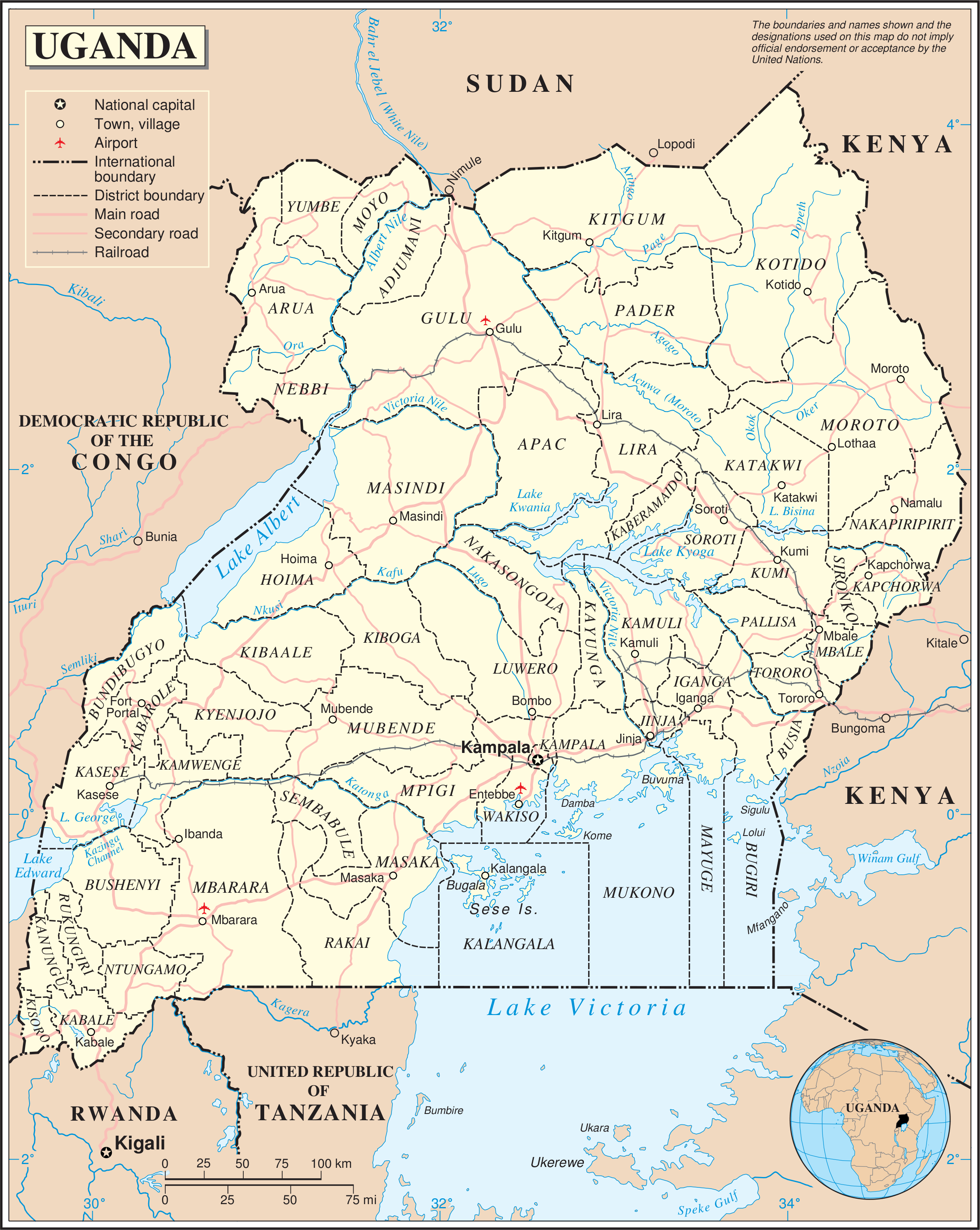
Districts of Uganda

In May 1986, exiled ex-UNLA members led by Brigadier Odong Latek organized a rebel group at Nimule, Sudan. It was named "Uganda People's Democratic Army" (UPDA), while its political wing was termed the "Uganda People's Democratic Movement" (UPDM). The political wing was led by Eric Otema-Allimadi, former Prime Minister in the Obote government. The group initially stayed in southern Sudan, tolerated by the Sudanese government. It is disputed whether the group received actual support from the Sudanese leadership. According to journalist Caroline Lamwaka, the UPDA was not directly supported by the Sudanese government, but was able to buy guns and bullets from Sudanese sources, including the Sudanese Armed Forces. The UPDA was organized into eight brigades, each headed by an ex-UNLA officer of Acholi ethnicity; each brigade was assigned an area in northern Uganda. The eight officers then began to collect troops inside and outside Uganda. It soon began to clash with another insurgent group, the Sudan People's Liberation Army (SPLA). This motivated the UPDA to return to Uganda.

The UPDA launched its first offensive into Uganda on 16 August 1986, starting with various uprisings and ambushes in Kitgum District. At the time, the group was tens of thousands strong, but critically short on weaponry and ammunition. The group won a number of early victories, most notably capturing the town of Pece. However, an assault of 3,000 to 4,000 UPDA militants on the border town of Bibia failed to defeat the NRA garrison. The rebels retreated after suffering about 200 casualties. Another UPDA column continued its advance, intending to take Gulu to open a way for an eventual assault on Kampala. The insurgents encountered resistance at Namokora, held by the infamous 35th Battalion, and were beaten back on 28 August. The UPDA renewed its attack on 14 September, overwhelming the defenders and forcing the 35th Battalion to hastily retreat to Kitgum. However, the rebels proved unable to capitalize on this success, as the NRA continued to hold the remaining northern towns. The UPDA was thus forced to operate as rural insurgency, initially relying on support of the local Acholi population. However, the UPDA proved to be undisciplined, and just as prone to violence and looting as the NRA. It gradually lost civilian support and cohesion; its fighting ability gradually whittled away during the following months. Meanwhile, NRA units including the 35th Battalion continued brutal counter-insurgency operations to contain the uprising. The government troops resorted to burning houses, looting food, raping and killing civilians to terrorize them into submission.

A separate rebellion broke out in Acholiland on 6 August 1986, when a female spirit medium named Alice Auma declared that the spirit "Lakwena" had ordered her to wage war against the NRM government and witchcraft. At this point, Auma had already been active as healer in Opit since May 1985, and had gained some regional recognition. At the beginning, her father Severino Lukoya had also played a role in the nascent Holy Spirit Movement (HSM). After he had attempted to take a hegemonic role, Auma sent him away from Opit and cemented her central role. Her actual rebellion began when Auma encountered a group of UPDA rebels who, according to different tellings of the events, either attacked or kidnapped her. She then awed the rebels through a display of her powers – her father claimed that she performed a miracle – and they asked her for help in the war against the NRA. Auma consequently organized the "Holy Spirit Mobile Force" (HSMF) as the HSM's armed wing with 80 ex-UNLA and ex-UPDA combatants who believed in her messianic teachings. Auma proved to be a charismatic leader; historian Richard J. Reid described her as "self-proclaimed prophetess". Initially, she encountered strong scepticism from potential armed followers who were doubtful that a woman could lead them in combat. In such situations, "Lakwena" possessed Auma and declared that she had been intentionally chosen as rebel leader because women were oppressed in Africa.

Auma was able to organize a highly centralized rebel group by stating that the HSM was led and supported by spirits. Overall, Auma claimed that 140,000 spirits had been sent by God to aid and protect her army; these spirits had jobs, ranging from military to civilian duties. In combat, the spirits were supposed to shield HSM fighters from bullets, and if a HSM fighter was killed, they would rejoin the community by becoming another spirit. Researcher Heike Behrend described this as a form of "ancestor cult". Besides the regular spirits, there were special spirits who formed the HSM's high command – they had different personalities, and possessed Auma when the need arose. "Lakwena" ("messenger" or "apostle" in Acholi) was the spirit of a pious Italian who had drowned in the Nile; he acted as chief commander. His deputy was the aggressive female Arabian spirit "Miriam". In addition, there were many spirit sub-commanders heading various sections of the HSM. For example, the Chinese or North Korean spirit "Ching Poh" was responsible for weapons as well as transportation. (Note: Other spirit commanders included: The impolite and loud American spirit "Wrong Element" leading the HSM's medical training facility and its intelligence service; the wise Zairean spirit "Franko" who was responsible for supplies; the female Ugandan spirit "Nyaker" who acted as nurse and exorcist; "Jeremiah" who was a healer of especially dangerous sicknesses; and the Arabian warrior spirits "Shaban", "Ali Shila", "Medina", "Mohammed", and "Kassim".) As the spirit commanders acted through Auma, she was able to keep firm control over her army. The belief in supernatural support provided the Holy Spirit Movement with cohesion and an attractive ideology which integrated Christianity with local heterodox belief systems. In addition, Auma implemented draconian discipline and a strict code of conduct, organizing a military police and logistics groups to enforce these and keep the HSM well-organized. The HSM generally used human wave attacks which were successful when encountering less trained enemies, but often failed catastrophically against well-armed enemies. In addition, the HSM also terrorized civilians through looting and killings despite its official policies.

Auma's group was not the only spiritual militant group in the north. Others also emerged around this time. One was led by another self-proclaimed healer, Joseph Kony. (Note: Kony's early life and how he started his own movement remain obscure. According to some accounts, he originally fought as part of the UPDA or Auma's HSM before experiencing a spirit possession and becoming a healer on his own. He claimed to be possessed by the spirit of Juma Oris (who was still alive at the time), and by "Lakwena".) He and Auma came into contact after she started her insurgency, and formed an alliance. However, this union broke apart after Auma humiliated Kony. The latter consequently became her rival and left with his loyalists as well as a few HSM dissidents. He initially also called his force the "Holy Spirit Movement", but later repeatedly renamed it to "United Holy Salvation Army", "People's Democratic Christian Army", and "United Democratic Christian Army". Kony's group mostly operated in Gulu District. In addition, there existed a "Holy Spirit Movement" led by Philip Ojuk at Anaka in Kitgum District, and the "United Uganda Godly Movement" (UUGM) of Otunu Lukonyomoi. The other spiritual groups initially remained much weaker than Auma's, with Kony's group being described as an "armed gang" instead of an actual rebel faction.

=== The HSM's crusade and emergence of the UPA ===
The Holy Spirit Movement's approximate area of operation (shaded blue), and its later march into the south (blue arrows) in 1987

The HSM began its operations with an unsuccessful attack on Gulu on 19 October 1986. The group consequently moved to Kitgum, where it linked up with the UPDA's 70th Brigade. After relocating to the Kitgum area, the HSM launched its next attack against a NRA position at Camp Kilak on 22 November 1986. The assault failed, but prompted a government counter-attack against on Auma's camp on 26 November. However, the HSM defeated the attacking NRA troops, greatly boosting Auma's reputation. Several UPDA units consequently defected to her. The HSM next attacked and overran Pajule on 25 December. The rebels then renewed their attempts at capturing Camp Kilak. After heavy fighting and despite substantial losses, the HSM took the position on 14 January 1987. At this point, the HSM was about 7,000 to 10,000 fighters strong and increased its efforts to mobilize civilian support. NRA commander Fred Rwigyema responded to the loss of Camp Kilak by launching a counter-attack using the NRA Mobile Brigade and other units. This operation resulted in a major defeat of the HSM on 18 January, when about 350 rebels were killed in battle, including Lieutenant Colonel Eric Odwar. In the counter-insurgency operations against the HSM, the Tutsi NRA soldiers committed so many massacres that President Museveni sent special military judges to "curb his own army" in the north. One of these judges was future Rwandan President Paul Kagame.

Despite the defeat inflicted by Rwigyema, the HSM quickly recovered and launched new attacks, this time aimed at Puranga. The rebels captured the town on 16 February. The HSM consequently expanded into Lira District, recruiting new fighters, but failed to capture the city of Lira. The HSM's main force subsequently returned to its shrine at Opit. Meanwhile, several self-defense groups in the Teso region united to oppose the NRA. They formed the "Uganda People's Army" (UPA) and appointing Peter Otai as overall leader and Francis "Hitler" Eregu as military chief commander. Other notable UPA leaders included Musa Ecweru and Nathan Okurut. The UPA organized into four main columns, while raising local militias as support units. Its forces were often poorly armed, resorting to knives and machetes (pangas). The UPA used the NRA's inability to stop cattle raiding to mobilize local support, and even spread claims about the NRA aiding the raiders. However, the UPA's uprising actually worsened the local conditions, as cattle raiders exploited the fighting between the UPA and the NRA to increase their attacks. Some NRA units actually took part in the cattle raiding, but other claims about government complicity were false. At least one UPA group had recognized that cattle raiding was a useful propaganda tool. Accordingly, one rebel commander organized his fighters to carry out raids and then blame them on the NRA.

The UPA quickly began to seize territory and developed into a major opponent to the government. It began to besiege the town of Soroti. From an early point, UPA's official leadership-in-exile under Otai lost effective control of their forces, with many UPA and FOBA fighters operating purely for local reasons, often as de facto bandits. The uprisings of UPA and FOBA are collectively known as the "Teso Insurgency".

In the north, however, the UPDA struggled to keep its rebellion going. Although its troops had encircled Gulu, causing shortages of various goods and food, the group had lost its rear bases. Sudan had expelled all UPDA forces from its soil after their invasion of Uganda, while the group had been unable to get international backers. It also had to defend its captured territories, while suffering from heavy losses and a growing number of desertions. The UPDA was "bled of its men and equipment" by the HSM, while several groups of UPDA fighters defected to Joseph Kony's faction between February and April 1987.

=== Collapse of the HSM ===
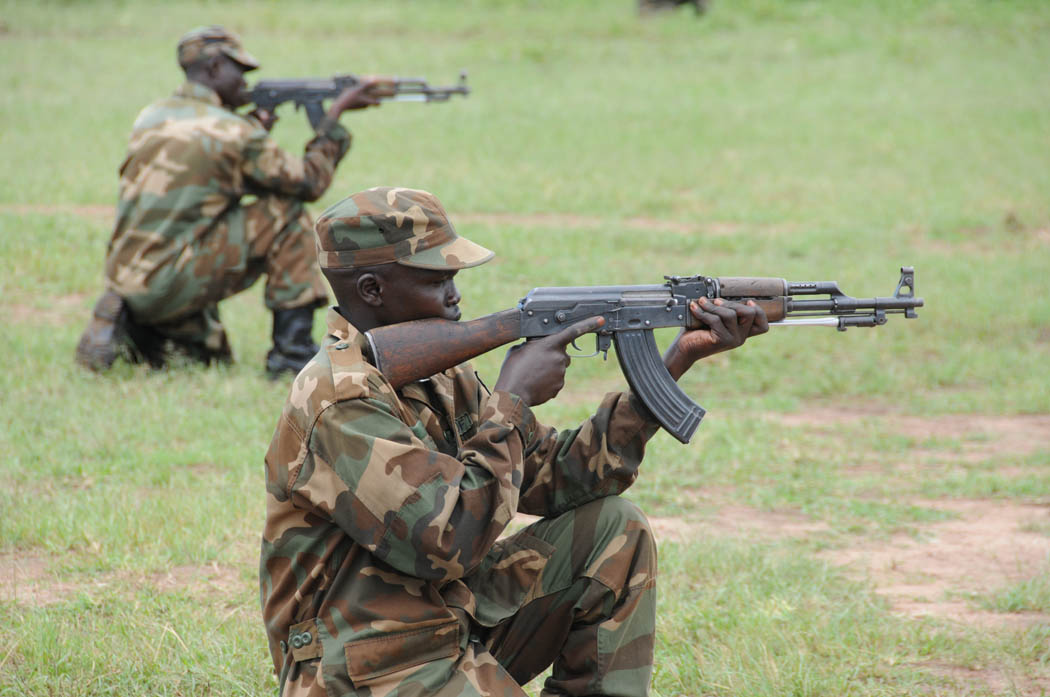
Soldiers of the Uganda People's Defence Force, the NRA's successor organization, in 2012.

Around April 1987, Auma negotiated with the UPDA and UPA to unite their forces against the NRM government. The other rebel groups refused to submit to the HSM, resulting in a collapse of the negotiations and the escalation of tensions between the factions. UPDA loyalists disparagingly regarded the HSM as "witchcraft organisation". UPDA troops began harassing isolated HSM fighters, and Auma responded by launching operations which destroyed two UPDA units near Gula and Kitgum. Captured UPDA fighters who refused to join the HSM were executed. The UPDA was significantly weakened by these clashes with the HSM. As the rebels fought each other, the NRA used the opportunity to attack Auma's base and shrine at Opit on 29 June. The HSM was surprised at this operation, and its defences were disorganized. After just one hour of combat, the HSM had to abandon Opit. An attempt to retake Opit failed on 4 July, followed by the HSM moving into Soroti District. There, Auma opened negotiations with the UPA besiegers of Soroti, but hostilities quickly rose. The talks degenerated into fighting, whereupon the HSM moved to Mbale District. From this point on, the NRA increasingly isolated and gradually destroyed the HSM through containment tactics. Although the HSM remained mobile and still scored occasional victories, it moved into areas where the local population was hostile and supply became more difficult.

Having advanced into Tororo District, the HSM was encircled and subjected to heavy mortar fire by the NRA on 30 September 1987. The insurgent group lost around 35% of their troops during this battle, including 500 defectors. Auma was able to break out of the encirclement on 1 October, and decided to march against the city of Jinja. Jinja was located in Busoga, however, its population was extremely hostile to the HSM and actively supported the NRA's attempts to defeat the rebels. On 25 October, Auma ordered her forces to attack the Magamaga barracks near Jinja. The NRA garrison allowed the rebels to enter a kill zone before opening fire. The battle was a major defeat for the HSM, losing at least 100 dead and 60 captured. Isolated and demotivated, the HSM disintegrated and its last cohesive group was surrounded by the NRA on 28 October. The HSM scattered, and Auma escaped with a few followers to Kenya. Most of the remaining HSM fighters retreated back into northern Uganda, with many dying of sickness or killed by hostile locals on the way. Several joined other insurgent factions. Others surrendered to the government, joining the NRA or returning to civilian life. Auma's HSM was finished as fighting force.

=== Insurgencies in western and central Uganda ===
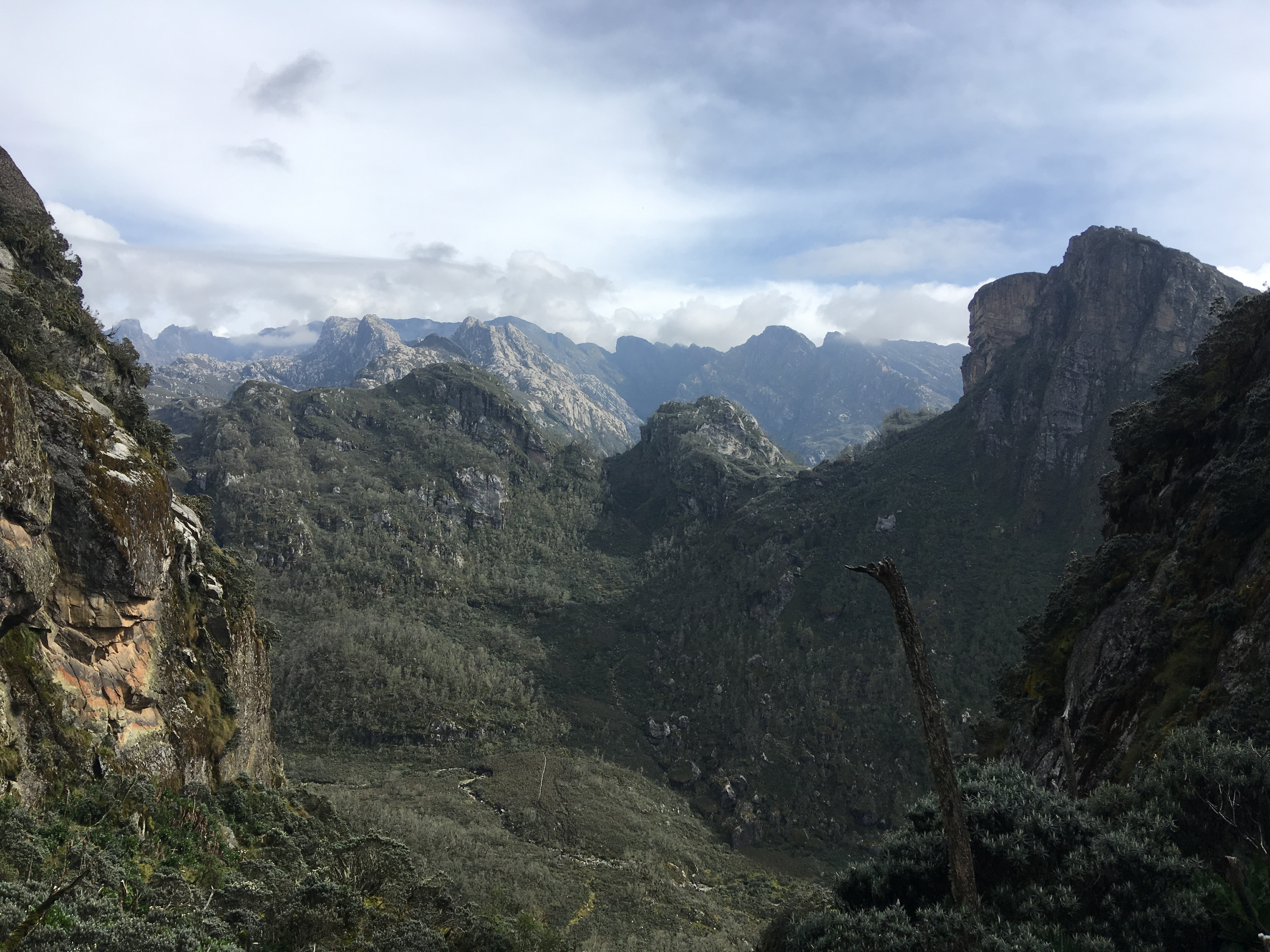
The Rwenzori Mountains at the Zaire–Uganda border harbored various rebel groups.

While the main uprisings of 1986/87 were located in Acholiland and the Teso region, smaller insurgencies also affected the West Nile region of the northwest, the western border areas, and central Uganda. The western rebels were based in Zaire (present-day DR Congo) and reportedly supported by the government of Zairean dictator Mobutu Sese Seko. These groups did not become a major threat, however, and the NRM government mostly limited itself to strengthening border defences and filing periodic protests with the Zairean government. Uganda also supported the "Partie de Liberation Congolaise" (PLC), an anti-Mobutu rebel group based in the Rwenzori Mountains.

The anti-NRM rebels in the west included the National Army for the Liberation of Uganda (NALU) led by ex-official Amon Bazira. It was formed by ex-members of the secessionist Rwenzururu movement and was active from around 1987. Bazira managed to convince both Mobutu as well as President Moi of Kenya to support his group. This aid allowed NALU to grow into an "irritant" to Museveni's government, although the group lacked the popular support which the old Rwenzururu movement had enjoyed. The West Nile Bank Front (WNBF) led by Juma Oris was active for a short period in 1988, before being dormant until the mid-1990s. West Nile native and ex-President Idi Amin unsuccessfully attempted to organize a rebel invasion into Uganda from Zaire in 1989, but was arrested by Zairean security forces and subsequently returned to his exile in Saudi Arabia. In 1990, rebels who were reportedly associated with FUNA launched raids from Zaire into West Nile. In the same year, Sudanese Armed Forces soldiers and rebels of the "Idi Amin group" attacked a NRA company in northwestern Uganda, forcing it to retreat after three assaults. Museveni consequently met with the Sudanese chargé d'affaires Al-Sharaf Ahmad and military attaché Brigadier Moses Abd al-Rahim, demanding consequences including the removal of Ugandan rebels from Sudanese soil. The Sudanese military attaché responded that the attack had been a mistake a local commander, and did not reflect hostility from the Sudanese government which wanted to maintain good relations with Uganda.

By 1988, the "Uganda Federal Army" (UFA) became active. Its first action was a bombing in Kampala in January 1988 that killed Libyan diplomat Ayyad Abeid Matus. The group claimed to fight communism and Libyan influence in Uganda. In December of that year the UFA's leader, Captain Charles Barau, threatened that his forces would try to kill all Libyans in Uganda if they did not leave the country within 30 days. UFA was later identified as military wing of the Uganda National Democratic Alliance (UNDA), although the latter was reportedly founded under the leadership of Sam Luwero in 1989. The UNDA waged an insurgency in central Uganda. In addition, a faction of Tablighi Jamaat, a Sunni Islamic missionary movement, became increasingly radical and militant. Tablighi Jamaat militants led by Jamil Mukulu twice raided the Old Kampala Mosque in 1991, attempting to seize the offices of the Uganda Muslim Supreme Council (UMSC). Four policemen were killed in the second attack, resulting in mass arrests of Tablighi Jamaat members.

=== Kenyan-Ugandan border conflict and NOM insurgency ===
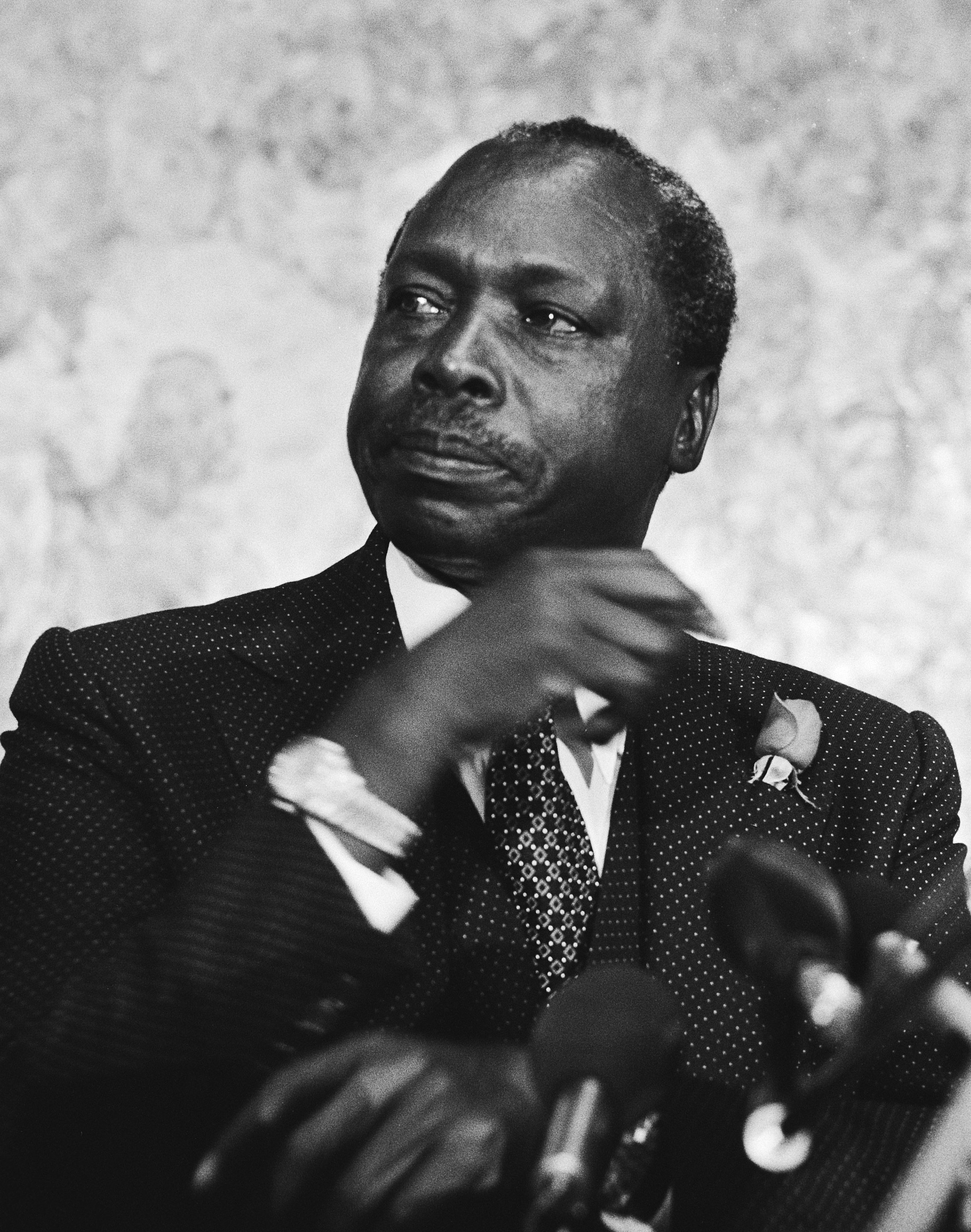
The Ugandan government accused Kenya under President Daniel arap Moi (pictured 1979) of supporting Ugandan rebels.

The eastern border region was another area affected by insurgencies. After the NRM had taken power in Uganda, relations with Kenya had worsened due to Kenyan President Moi's distrust of Museveni. He suspected that the left-leaning NRM might be supporting the Mwakenya Movement, a socialist Kenyan insurgent force. It was known that the NRM allowed Mwakenya fighters to travel freely through Uganda. Kenya consequently started to fund and arm UPA insurgents. In October 1987, tensions escalated into a firefight between the NRA and the Kenya Army at the border town of Busia. In response, Museveni publicly accused Kenya of supporting anti-NRM rebels. He deployed troops to the border, officially to stop guerrillas from crossing into Uganda; Moi responded by stating that any attempts by the NRA to violate the Kenyan border would be met with force. The Kenya Times, regarded as being close to Moi, accused the NRM of supporting Kenyan rebels, spying, kidnappings of Kenyans, and cattle rustling. On 15 December 1987, at least 26 NRA soldiers were killed during an incursion into Kenya, causing the tensions to almost escalate into open war. Although the situation was defused as a result of talks organized by Mengistu Haile Mariam of Ethiopia and Ali Hassan Mwinyi of Tanzania, tensions continued.

The "Ninth of October Movement" (NOM), led by Dan Opito, emerged around 1988. In February 1989, NOM began launching attacks into eastern and northeastern Uganda from Kenyan soil. It clashed with the NRA at Usuku. The group was suspected of links to ex-President Milton Obote. In March 1989, the Ugandan air force bombed the Kenyan town of Lokichogio. Although war was once again avoided, relations between Uganda and Kenya were not normalized until a meeting between Moi and Museveni in August 1990. Regardless, the NOM continued its insurgency at the border.

=== Decline of the UPDA and UPA, rise of Joseph Kony ===
While the HSM was advancing into the southeast, the UPDA continued its operations in Acholiland. Weakened by the inter-rebel fighting and the NRA's increasingly effective counter-insurgency operations, the UPDA declined substantially from late 1987. The NRM government offered amnesties to the rebels, while forcibly moving 33,000 civilians from the countryside into camps around Gulu. As a result, the UPDA found it difficult to replenish its numbers, while many of its fighters surrendered to the government. In November 1987, the UPDA allied with Kony's faction to launch an offensive to capture Gulu city. However, disputes erupted and Kony betrayed his allies, attacking their headquarters at Pawel Owor while the UPDA prepared its assault. The UPDA was consequently forced to abandon its offensive plans. In January 1988, Kony successfully attacked the UPDA's 115th Brigade, and convinced many of its troops including Captain Mark Lapyem to join his movement. At this point, rebel surrenders to the government had grown greatly in numbers, and the security situation in many northern areas had markedly improved. The area around Gulu became safe enough for schools to be reopened and local elections to be held, while many refugees returned from the bush. Cooperation between the NRA and the locals improved, partially due to the establishment of so-called "Local Defence Units" (LDU) who were recruited from the northerners and thus considered to be more effective in dealing with local threats. The UPDA and NRA also began to occasionally fight together against Kony's force, as UPDA units viewed the various spiritualist factions as worse enemies as a result of the constant rebel infighting.

From March 1988, the UPDA's military command agreed to talks with NRM representatives, led by Salim Saleh. The rebels' political wing (the UPDM) was excluded from the negotiations. Large sections of the UPDA concluded that their insurgency had become too costly, as they suffered from Kony's attacks while lacking sufficient supplies; the UPDA troops also felt abandoned by the UPDM due to their failure to provide support, and had lost confidence in Odong Latek's leadership. The NRA was also becoming more willing to make a deal with the UPDA as it was also exhausted by the constant war and still faced multiple other insurgencies. On 3 June 1988, the UPDA and the government signed a peace agreement which resulted in the integration of UPDA soldiers and officers into the NRA. As a result, 10,000 UPDA militants reportedly laid down their weapons.

In contrast, fighting in Teso continued as both sides initially became more ruthless, using torture, rape and murder to intimidate civilians. Atrocities became commonplace such as when the NRA's 106th Battalion locked 120 suspected UPA supporters into a rail wagon at Okungolo, leaving 69 to die from thirst and heat within a day. The NRA began to relocate 120,000 villagers into camps to deprive the insurgents of support; these camps were badly maintained, resulting in the spread of sicknesses and high civilian losses. Regardless, these tactics succeeded in gradually weakening the UPA. In February 1988, about 7,000 UPA rebels surrendered at Lira and Apac, mostly ending the regional uprising. By 1991, the majority of the UPA had accepted the government's amnesty offers, although a few groups continued to fight.

Meanwhile, the HSM remnants and the other spiritualist factions were reconsolidating. Many ex-followers of Auma still believed in "Lakwena". Many linked up with the movements of Ojuk and Kony, greatly increasing their military strength. Others turned to the prophetess' father Severino Lukoya. He declared that he would continue his daughter's mission, taking control of the HSM's center at Opit. As medical support in Kitgum had completely collapsed, Lukoya emphasized healing instead of warfare, and amassed about 2,000 supporters. Unlike his daughter, he put more focus on eschatological ideas and the Last Judgment, believing that the time of God's "New World" was approaching. His movement was also less centralized. Despite these differences, Lukoya put great importance in portraying himself as Auma's successor which included enlisting the support of the same spirit commanders, most of whom reappeared in his movement. There were some exceptions, as the Chinese/North Korean spirit "Ching Po" reportedly refused to join him. Lukoya also enlisted new spirits, most of whom were individuals of importance to the Acholi or HSM who had died during the last years, such as the ghost of UNLA chief commander David Oyite-Ojok. Lukoya's faction continued to use the name "Holy Spirit Movement", but was also known as the "Lord's Army".

In February 1988, a HSM splinter group (Note: Minister Lawrence Semogerere was unable to identify whether Ochuli's group was loyal to a larger HSM splinter. It was a few hundred strong, and possessed only few guns. One member of the faction, "Brigadier Kasabong" appeared to be of western Ugandan origin. Ugandan intelligence and local civilians indicated that Ochuli's group might have been part of Lukoya's movement.) led by "Chief" James Ochuli ambushed a convoy of government ministers near Kitgum, kidnapping Minister Lawrence Semogerere. The insurgents promptly declared Semogerere their own minister. Soon after, Ochuli's force unsuccessfully attacked Kitgum. Afterwards, Semogerere was sent south to organize an uprising in Buganda, but was able to trick his captors and flee. In early March 1988, Lukoya's armed forces repeatedly attempted to capture Kitgum, but failed and reportedly lost 433 fighters. In contrast, Kony's army enjoyed its first major victories. Despite being mostly armed with spears, the group overran a NRA-LDU position at Koch-Goma on 23 February 1988. Even more significant was a victory in April of that year, when Kony's rebels overran a NRA position at Bibia. Kony also began to kidnap civilians for ransom and to replenish his force. In course of early to mid 1988, Kony attempted to unify the spiritualist groups into "The Lord's Army". He convinced the UUGM of Otunu Lukonyomoi and Philip Ojuk's HSM to join him. Lukonyomoi occasionally clashed with Kony over his group's treatment of civilians, leading to some tensions within the movement. In May, his force was bolstered by 39 UPDA cadres who disagreed with their group's decision to surrender to the government. Most sources state that this group, led by ex-UPDA leader Odong Latek, joined Kony's army willingly. However, one former confidant of Kony later argued that Latek and his men had been rounded up and basically conscripted by Kony. Either way, the UPDA veterans proved crucial in turning Kony's force into a more professional rebel group. He consequently began to rely more on proper guerrilla tactics and kidnappings instead of previous mass assaults. Regardless, Kony continued to believe that the apocalypse was imminent; in this way, he rationalized that his forces had to force civilians to join their movement to save them for the coming "New World". Spirits also continued to play a major role in his group, and he even allowed other spirit mediums to join his force. However, the spirits of his force were more often Christian figures from the Bible than in the old HSM; Kony generally became increasingly opposed to pagan elements and emphasized the Christian nature of his rebellion.

In August 1988, Lukoya decided to spread his movement into Gulu District which Kony considered his territory. He consequently sent his fighters to arrest Lukoya, declared the rule of the "Lakwenas" over, and destroyed Lukoya's altar. His remaining forces joined Kony. (Note: Lukoya escaped from Kony's custody in May 1989, and lived as an ascetic at Alero for a few months until he was captured by the NRA.) October to December 1988 saw some of the most intense fighting during the war. The NRA forcibly removed about 100,000 people from Gulu and its surroundings; hundreds were executed without due process, homes were burned, and goods plundered. Lukonyomoi was killed in a NRA attack during this time, whereupon several rebels deserted Kony. His group was substantially weakened for a time. Although Kony's army continued to fight, aided by the "almost impenetrable terrain" of northern Acholiland, the rebels were isolated by the NRA to the south and the hostile SPLA rebels in Sudan to the north. In November 1989, Odong Latek was killed when the NRA stormed a rebel camp at Pawic in Palabek County, Lamwo District.

=== Operation North and reduction of rebel activity ===
When the Gulf War broke out in August 1990, Kony regarded this as a sign for the impending, worldwide apocalypse. Kony's forces increased their attacks, operating in small groups that terrorized other rebel factions and kidnapped growing numbers of schoolchildren, students, women, and men. These civilians were conscripted as porters or distributed as rewards to fighters. Kony's fighters also began to mutilate people, cutting off noses and lips of suspected government supporters. Regardless, Kony's army still enjoyed substantial support or at least toleration in Gulu District, as the group mostly left civilians alone who did not cooperate with the NRA. In turn, many government troops behaved worse towards locals than Kony's troops, raping, murdering, and plundering.

The NRA responded to the escalation of Kony's activity by stepping up its counter-insurgency campaign. It launched "Operation North" to wipe out the northern insurgents. Led by Major General David Tinyefuza, the NRA closed off the districts of Apac, Gulu, Lira, and Kitgum in early April 1991. The government troops then started search-and-destroy operations, while setting up local militias as support forces. These badly armed troops became known as the "Arrow Boys". The NRA operated ruthlessly, committing several atrocities against the population. Regardless, the combined NRA-Arrow Boys operations succeeded in greatly weakening the rebels, with the government claiming that 3,000 of Kony's fighters had been "eliminated" in Kitgum in May 1991. Overconfident, the NRA decided to end Operation North in July 1991, and left the Arrow Boys to mop up Kony's remaining troops. However, his rebel force (renamed to "Lord's Resistance Army" / LRA) proved to be still capable of offensive actions. It counter-attacked, devastating pro-government communities and factually wiping out the Arrow Boys by early 1992. In addition, the SPLA rebels were weakened from late 1991, allowing the Sudanese National Islamic Front government to partially restore its authority in the Sudanese–Ugandan border area. The Sudanese government consequently began to set up contacts with the LRA. Kony moved to Juba in Sudan, while the LRA symbolically adopted some Islamic elements. It was consequently promised military support by the Sudanese government.

However, the LRA had been weakened enough to open negotiations with the government. As a result, the activity of the LRA was greatly reduced between 1992 and 1993. By mid-1993, only about 300 LRA fighters were left. Meanwhile, other insurgent factions also diminished. FOBA ceased operations by 1990. NALU's members began to surrender by 1992 due to battlefield losses. In mid-1993, the group collapsed after Ugandan agents killed Bazira in Nairobi. The UPA was regarded as defeated by 1992, although a few holdouts remained active. NOM reportedly took part in "disturbances" at Busia around April 1991, but was otherwise not very active in the early 1990s. UNDA stopped fighting in 1993. In that year, several Tablighi Jamaat radicals including Jamil Mukulu were released from prison, whereupon they organized the Ugandan Muslim Freedom Fighters (UMFF) and started a small-scale insurgency in Buseruka, western Uganda.

After a period of talks, an agreement between the government and the LRA seemed possible. Minister for the Pacification of the North Betty Oyella Bigombe met with Kony in January 1994. These talks were promising, and a ceasefire was agreed upon. However, the talks were unpopular in the NRM; as a result, the next series of talks archived no progress. On 6 February 1994, President Museveni stopped the peace process by announcing an ultimatum for the LRA to surrender within six days. Fighting consequently resumed, marking the start of a new phase in the Ugandan conflict.

== Aftermath ==
In 1994, the Uganda government and rebels increasingly involved themselves in conflicts in Zaire, Sudan, and Rwanda. As warfare spread across borders in central Africa, rebel groups exploited the chaos to gain international supporters and spread their influence. The western Ugandan rebels grew dramatically in strength from 1994, as Sudan began to support them. Most importantly, the LRA's rebellion intensified and expanded in scope once again. With Sudanese support, the LRA grew to over two thousand well-armed fighters by March 1994, allowing it to raid all of northern Uganda, displacing hundreds of thousands. The Sudanese government also set up new rebel groups and organized the merger of insurgent factions; most notably, remnants of NALU, UMFF, UMLA, and others formed the Allied Democratic Forces (ADF) that consequently waged a decades-long insurgency. With Sudanese aid, new rebellions broke out in the West Nile region which persisted until the early 2000s. In turn, Uganda invaded Zaire and Sudan as part of the First Congo War and the Second Sudanese Civil War, partially in an attempt to destroy the rear bases of Ugandan rebels.

Besides the north and the west, other areas of Uganda also became affected by new or revived insurgencies. Around 1995, NOM and the remaining UPA holdouts also joined forces, attacking government targets around Tororo and along the Kenyan border. In 1995, a new "Uganda National Democratic Alliance" (UNDA) was organized under the leadership of ex-NRA Major Herbert Kikomeko Itongwa.

The Ugandan government eventually succeeded in pacifying most of the country, and drove the ADF and LRA into exile. However, both groups remain active in the Congo, South Sudan, and the Central African Republic.

== See also ==
- List of wars involving Uganda
