= Northern Uganda campaign (January–March 1986) =

1986 battle of the Ugandan Bush War

Northern Ugandan campaign
- Part of the Ugandan Bush War
| Date | January–March 1986 |
| Location | Northern, eastern, and central Uganda |
| Result | National Resistance Movement (NRM) victory |

Belligerents
| Uganda (NRM government) Karamojong groups Langi rebels | Uganda National Liberation Army (UNLA) and allies |

Commanders and leaders
| David Tinyefuza; Peter Kerim; Samson Mande | Bazilio Olara-Okello; Eric Odwar; Stevenson Ojukwu; John Kilama; Kenneth Kilama; Joseph Obonyo; Walter Ochora |

Units involved
| National Resistance Army: 11th Battalion; 13th Battalion; 19th Battalion; Karamojong militias UNLA defectors and rebels | UNLA: Eastern Brigade; Southern Brigade; Air wing; West Nile militias: FUNA; UNRF; Acholi militias |

Strength
| Thousands | Thousands |

Casualties and losses
| Unknown | Heavy |

In the last phase of the Ugandan Bush War from January to March 1986, the National Resistance Army (NRA) conducted a military campaign to conquer northern Uganda beyond the Nile, an area still held by the Uganda National Liberation Army (UNLA) and allied militias that had previously been loyal to the recently deposed government of Ugandan President Tito Okello. After heavy fighting, the NRA emerged victorious, capturing all of the country. The UNLA and its allies largely disbanded their forces or surrendered, though a substantial number also fled into exile to continue resistance. The conquest of northern Uganda by the NRA marked the formal end of the Ugandan Bush War, though another civil war erupted a few months later.

== Background ==
In April 1979 Tanzanian forces and the Uganda National Liberation Army (UNLA), a coalition of armed rebel groups united under the Uganda National Liberation Front (UNLF), deposed the President of Uganda, Idi Amin. A new UNLF government was installed, but it was weak and exercised little control over the country. Eventually, Milton Obote assumed power in 1980 through a disputed election, and ruled through repressive methods, including the incarceration and killing of dissidents. In response, a number of opposition groups rebelled, with the developing conflict becoming known as the "Ugandan Bush War". Over time, Yoweri Museveni's National Resistance Movement (NRM) and its armed wing, National Resistance Army (NRA), emerged as the most important insurgent group in southern Uganda. As the civil war dragged on for years, parts of the UNLA became increasingly dissatisfied with Obote and his policies, including favoring ethnic Langi soldiers in the military over Acholi troops.

On 27 July, several Acholi officers of the UNLA launched a coup which overthrew President Obote. General Tito Okello assumed power in his place. The new regime was weak and unstable, and Okello made overtures to anti-Obote rebel groups to form a coalition government and end the fighting. These efforts yielded some results, with several groups –such as the Former Uganda National Army (FUNA) and Uganda National Rescue Front (UNRF)– signing agreements with the new government and allying with the UNLA. Conversely, the coup deeply damaged the UNLA's cohesion and discipline, with the military starting to devolve into infighting factions. Museveni took advantage of the disruption caused by the coup to strengthen his forces.

In August 1985, the NRA launched a series of coordinated attacks that resulted in the capture of significant amounts of territory in central and western Uganda. In course of these operations, the NRA greatly expanded by recruiting new troops in captured territories and absorbing defected government soldiers. In a few months, it enlisted around 9,000 fighters, growing to about 10,000 troops overall by December 1985. That month, a peace agreement was signed by Okello's government and the NRA, but the deal broke down almost immediately as both parties violated the agreed truce. By January 1986, the UNLA was starting to collapse as the rebels gained ground from the south and southwest. Okello's regime effectively ended when Kampala was captured by the NRA on 26 January 1986. The NRM formed a new government, and the NRA became the new regular army of Uganda. Tito Okello fled the capital via helicopter. Despite this massive defeat, the UNLA attempted to rally once more, and intended to defend its remaining holdings in northern Uganda.

== Prelude ==
The UNLA holdouts in the north largely consisted of Acholi troops and were led by Bazilio Olara-Okello. Thousands of UNLA troops had fled north, where they still enjoyed substantial support. The willingness of northerners to aid the UNLA's resistance attempts were fuelled by the widespread belief that the NRM/A was planning to take revenge on the north for the war crimes committed during the Bush War. These fears were seemingly confirmed when southerners killed and abused northern civilians –particularly Langi and Acholi– in a number of incidents after the Battle of Kampala. Some victims fled from Kampala back to the north, spreading tales of the attacks. Conversely, abuses were mostly committed by mobs or non-NRA troops, though NRA soldiers did often steal from northerners in Kampala. Meanwhile, President Museveni repeatedly made speeches on radio declaring that the NRM/A was committed to lawful behavior, had no intention to take revenge on northerners, and would investigate as well as limit abuses by the NRA. However, these promises were often distrusted, and attacks on northerners remained frequent in NRA-controlled territories. As a result, ethnic tensions continued to rise across the country. When the UNLA high command thus convened a meeting with elders and community leaders from Gulu and Kitgum, the civilian representatives gave their support to efforts of defending the north from the NRA. In contrast, the remaining UNLA soldiers –including many officers– declared their former leader, Tito Okello, a traitor, coward, and murderer who had appeased the NRA and then failed to contain it, resulting in their current predicament. When Okello arrived at Gulu on his flight from Kampala, Colonel Joseph Obonyo even proposed to execute the former president, but Bazilio Olara-Okello intervened and set Okello free. The latter promptly fled for Sudan, where he told journalists that he no longer controlled the "5,000 [UNLA] troops holding out in northern Uganda".

Bazilio Olara-Okello subsequently ordered a mass mobilization in Gulu and Kitgum. Everyone who could fight, including women and girls, was armed and provided with an ad hoc training. Most of the draftees were between 18 and 27 years old, had attended secondary schools, and volunteered due to the belief that the NRA planning an Acholi genocide. Many of the new recruits also belonged to families with connections to the old security forces. (Note: In contrast to these eyewitness accounts, researcher Adam Branch claimed that the UNLA remnants failed to rally the Acholi population to their cause.) The UNLA supplied the draftees with guns and machetes. The UNLA forces thus prepared to make a stand along the Nile crossings, such as at Karuma, and some northern locations such as Lira. Lieutenant Colonel Eric Odwar, head of the UNLA's Southern Brigade, was ordered to oversee the defenses' central axis at the Kampala–Gulu route, while Lieutenant Colonel Stevenson Ojukwu and Lieutenant Colonel John Kilama led the eastern UNLA troops at the Lira-Soroti-Mbale route. Olara-Okello publicly declared that he would make a "last stand" at Gulu, vowing to fight to the end.

== Campaign ==
=== Initial actions and assassination attempt on Museveni ===
In the immediate aftermath of the capture of Kampala, the NRA organized into three columns to conquer the rest of Uganda. An eastern section was ordered to advance to Jinja, Tororo, Mbale, Soroti, Lira, and finally Gulu, while a central force would directly march toward Gulu from Kampala. Finally, a western column under David Tinyefuza and Peter Kerim was supposed to move along the axis of Hoima, Masindi, and Karuma. The NRA's operations were aided by the internal chaos of the UNLA, as many soldiers suffered from low morale due to the loss of the capital and focused on fleeing with their families as well as loot instead of organizing resistance. Tororo was largely plundered by fleeing troops. Public support for the remaining UNLA loyalists began to suffer even in the north due to their widespread looting. At Jinja, UNLA troops reportedly also engaged in internal clashes, as loyalists opened fire on soldiers who wanted to surrender to the NRA. UNLA units of Langi ethnicity also rebelled, attacking Acholi soldiers across the northeast. They were joined by armed Karamojong who organized militias and hunted retreating Acholi forces. The Langi were motivated by a desire for revenge for their disempowerment after Okello had seized power in 1985. The Karamojong were a nomadic people that maintained a strong sense of independence; as a result of their traditional cattle raiding and opposition activities, the UNLA had repeatedly launched brutal punitive campaigns against Karamojong groups during the Bush War. Ambushes by Langi and Karamojong forces were reported around Moroto and Soroti. Aided by these circumstances, the NRA's eastern force quickly seized Jinja and Tororo around late January and early February, as the local UNLA defenders largely fled or defected.

At this point, the UNLA high command organized a last counteroffensive, with Lieutenant Colonel Kenneth Kilama's Eastern Brigade attempting to retake Tororo. This operation was partially motivated by the fact that eastern escape route of the UNLA had been blocked by Karamojong militias which had set up positions at the Awoja Bridge near Soroti. The eastern UNLA troops thus rallied, deciding to "return and fight back to Kampala". The counteroffensive and the NRA forces met each other at the River Manafwa, where a "bloody" and "fierce" battle took place, centered at the Manafwa Bridge on the Mbale-Tororo highway. UNLA troops also took up defensive positions in the swamps around the river such as at the Tororo-Busia road; there, they indiscriminately shot at and killed fleeing civilians. The counteroffensive was eventually repelled, and the NRA's 11th Battalion managed to break through the UNLA defenses to cross the River Manafwa. Regardless, these clashes caused a minor delay in the NRA's preparations to assault the UNLA's remaining territories in the north.

Meanwhile, the UNLA high command also opted for a "desperate move": It ordered one of its remaining helicopter gunships to bomb the Ugandan parliament building when Yoweri Museveni was sworn in as president on 29 January. The operation aimed at killing the NRM/A leader and his lieutenants, and was personally planned by Bazilio Olara-Okello as well as Col. Obonyo, head of the Gulu Air Base. The UNLA commanders hoped that killing Museveni would throw his forces into chaos, turning the tide in the war. The mission was entrusted to Flight Captain Stephen Ojiambo and his co-pilot Lieutenant Andama who left Gulu in a Bell Textron military helicopter armed with a heavy machine gun and 38 missiles. However, the helicopter crew concluded that their mission was senseless as the war was lost; furthermore, the planned attack would likely result in high civilian losses due to the large crowd gathered at the parliament building. They thus aborted the attack, instead landing at Nakasongola Air Base and subsequently surrendered to the NRA at a nearby police post. (Note: Ojiambo later joined the newly organized Uganda Air Force, rising to major and dying in the 2000s. Andama also joined the new air force, but was killed in a helicopter crash at Layibi in the 1990s.)

=== NRA conquest of the north ===
Meanwhile, the NRA resumed its offensive operations. East of Tororo, the NRA initially encountered little firm resistance as the local population had traditionally supported Obote's old government and were thus hostile toward the UNLA. Soon after Tororo had been secured, the NRA took the border towns of Malaba and Busia, restoring the traffic and trade route from Kenya to Kampala. It then moved northward, where it drove the UNLA garrison from Mbale with a short artillery barrage around 1 February. The NRA soldiers reportedly found the town heavily looted, as the UNLA troops had killed 50 civilians, engaged in rape, and stolen much before fleeing. Part of the local UNLA garrison reportedly retreated with a train pulling several wagonloads of coffee and weapons toward Gulu. According to United Press International, "analysts said [the capture of Mbale] was the NRA's most significant victory since the taking of the capital". The government forces then continued to march northward, capturing Soroti on 12 February. Afterward, the NRA force moved into the Lira and Apac Districts, evicting local UNLA troops and eventually pausing at Aloi on 25 February. It did so to coordinate further operations with the other NRA columns.

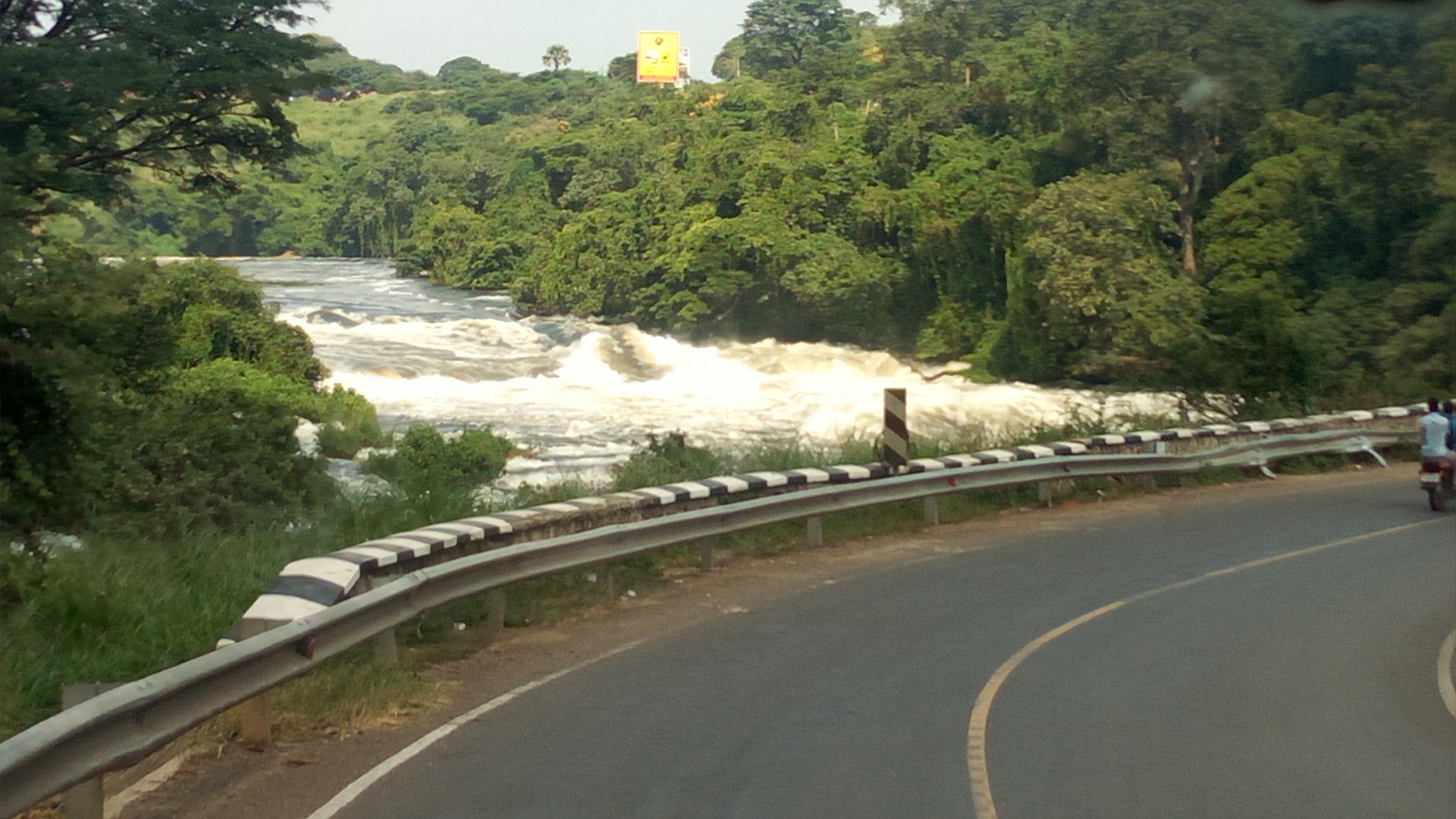
Heavy fighting took place at the Nile crossings (Karuma Bridge depicted in 2018)

The NRA's central column had captured Nakasongola Air Base around 2 February, causing the local UNLA defenders to flee to Kigumba. A few days later, the NRA's central and western groups linked up, with David Tinyefuza assuming overall command. They then attacked Kigumba on 5 February. After a short clash, the town fell to the attackers, while the UNLA forces in the region rallied at the fortified Nile crossings. The NRA then began its assault to cross the Nile, encountering particularly heavy resistance by the UNLA and allied West Nile militias at Karuma and Kamdini. After bitter fighting, the NRA's 13th and 19th Battalions managed to cross the Nile and advanced northward. (Note: Ondoga Ori Amaza claimed that the UNLA abandoned the Nile crossings without fighting due to the threat posed by the NRA's western column at Aloi, but this is contradicted by other sources.) As part of the battles along the rivers, the NRA inflicted "catastrophic losses" on the UNLA's Acholi troops and largely shattered them. Despite this, UNLA contingents continued some resistance efforts. In the Opaka forest, about 12 miles south of Gulu, a large force of new UNLA recruits armed with machetes attacked the NRA but were repelled, suffering heavy losses.

The NRA's 1st, 13th, and 19th Battalions subsequently captured Gulu and Kitgum in early March. The circumstances of Gulu's fall are disputed. According to contemporary statements by the NRA Defense Ministry and Radio Uganda, its forces captured the town after defeating the local UNLA garrison in a battle lasting three hours on late 8 March. Researchers Anthony Clayton and Ondoga Ori Amaza insteasd stated that the NRA defeated a large UNLA force near Gulu in a three-day battle, whereupon the rest of the garrison fled to Sudan via Kitgum. According to Colonel Samson Mande, head of the NRA troops at Gulu, the local UNLA garrison peacefully surrendered after negotiating with him. Researcher Adam Branch claimed that the local UNLA garrison retreated without offering resistance. The UNLA's eastern front also collapsed after a last, brief clash with the NRA near Lira in late March. Recognizing that his remaining forces suffered under low morale, Ojukwu ordered them to scatter at Puranga in the southern Kitgum District.

With effective resistance no longer possible, the UNLA completely disintegrated and its remnants fled into exile, along with many former government officials. The NRM claimed that at least 10,000 UNLA soldiers surrendered during the operations to capture the north. However, most of the UNLA soldiers demobilized, hid their uniforms and weapons, and returned to their home areas. The last UNLA pockets of resistance had been defeated by the end of March. The NRA continued its advance until it reached the state borders in the north, capturing Nimule at the Sudanese border on 28 March. This left just the West Nile region outside NRA control, most importantly the town of Arua. This area in northwestern Uganda was largely held by local militias and ex-insurgent groups, most importantly FUNA and UNRF. By this time, the population of West Nile was no longer willing to support resistance efforts, and the local elders convinced most FUNA and UNRF forces to peacefully reconcile with Museveni's government. The remaining West Nile militants fled into exile. Among others, UNLA commander Walter Ochora initially tried to mobilize troops at Nebbi, but a local delegation of elders led by Rwoth Obimo Valente Oyoma Jobi II, traditional king of the Alur people, pressured him and his supporters until most of them surrendered to the NRA while Ochora escaped. As NRA troops subsequently entered the West Nile region along the Gulu-Moyo and Karuma-Pakwach roads, they thus encountered no resistance and occupied the local settlements in agreement with the local elders, ending the campaign.

== Aftermath ==
To the surprise of the locals in northern Uganda, the NRA troops initially behaved well and were disciplined as they occupied the region. As a result, a growing number of northern civilians began to offer support to the NRM/A. However, this turned out to be temporary development. Even though the war appeared to be over, high unrest remained common across Uganda. Many UNLA soldiers were unable or unwilling to return to civilian life, and started to operate as bandits. Furthermore, some NRA units started to commit substantial abuses in the north, increasing the willingness of the local population to resist. Ultimately, local rebellions and the return of exiled insurgents plunged Uganda back into a civil war.
