= Battle of Kembogo =

1985 battle of the Ugandan Bush War

- Part of the Ugandan Bush War
Date	21 June 1985
Location	Kembogo, Luwero Triangle, Uganda 0.74°N 32.15°E
Result	National Resistance Movement victory

Belligerents
Uganda	National Resistance Movement

Commanders and leaders
Eric Odwar; Joseph Kiyengo	Salim Saleh; Patrick Lumumba; Stephen Kashaka; Fredrick Mugisha "China" Mafundo

Units involved
UNLA: Special Brigade	National Resistance Army: Mobile Brigade

Strength
2 battalions	c. 1,500

Casualties and losses
c. 200–300 killed	23 killed

The Battle of Kembogo (21 June 1985) was fought between National Resistance Movement (NRM) rebels and the Ugandan government during the late Ugandan Bush War. After the government's Uganda National Liberation Army (UNLA) attempted to corner and destroy a major rebel force under Salim Saleh, the latter lured their pursuers into an ambush and inflicted a heavy defeat on them. The battle contributed to growing unrest among government forces.

The battle took place after the NRM's armed wing, the National Resistance Army (NRA), had managed to expand its operations and engaged in a series of successful attacks and raids. The UNLA's main counter-insurgency commander, John Charles Ogole, subsequently organized an operation to destroy the NRA's most important formation, the Mobile Brigade. After detecting the rebel unit, three UNLA battalions were dispatched and managed to corner the Mobile Brigade in the Singo area of the Luwero Triangle. NRA commander Saleh responded by unexpectedly switching from evasive maneuvers to a pitched battle, confronting two of the three government battalions. In this surprise confrontation, the insurgents inflicted heavy losses on the UNLA troops and routed them. This NRA victory demoralized the UNLA, contributing to a widespread mutiny and eventually the 1985 Ugandan coup d'état.

== Background ==
In April 1979 Tanzanian forces and the Uganda National Liberation Army (UNLA), a coalition of armed rebel groups united under the Uganda National Liberation Front (UNLF), invaded Uganda and deposed the president, Idi Amin. A new UNLF government was installed, but it was weak and exercised little control over the country. This was in part due to the UNLF's and its army's own internal divisions. One of the most important rivalries emerged between the supporters of Milton Obote and Yoweri Museveni. Over time power shifted to pro-Obote elements in the government and the army. Obote assumed power in 1980 through a disputed election, and ruled through repressive methods, including the incarceration and killing of dissidents. In February 1981 Museveni and a small band of rebels began attacking UNLA forces, entering the Ugandan Bush War. Shortly thereafter a new rebel coalition was organised as the National Resistance Movement (NRM). Museveni was made vice-chairman of the National Resistance Council, the group's political body, and Chairman of the High Command of the National Resistance Army (NRA), the movement's armed organ.

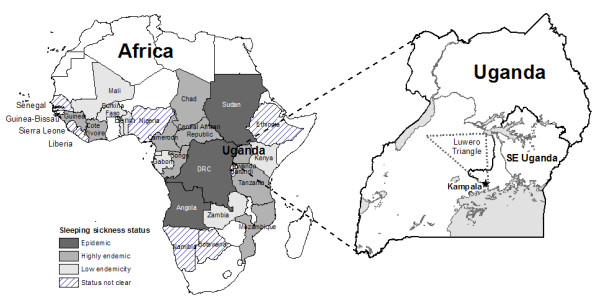
Map of Uganda, showcasing the approximate area of the Luwero Triangle

The NRA mainly operated in the Luwero Triangle, west of Uganda's capital Kampala. Knowing that his force was far smaller and not well equipped, Museveni envisioned that the NRA would wage a long-term "people's war" to gradually undermine Obote's government and build up support across Uganda, starting with the Luwero region where many civilians were already sympathetic to his cause. Over the next years, fighting between the NRA and UNLA ebbed and flowed, as the government would launch major counterinsurgency operations in the Luwero Triangle, disrupting NRA activities, only for the rebels to retake lost territory upon the end of the offensives.

In early 1984, the NRA won a number of victories over the security forces, most importantly raiding the cities of Masindi and Hoima. Emboldened, Museveni decided to launch another attack on Kabamba, site of a barracks and weapons depot. The NRA had already unsuccessfully attempted raids on the locality before, most notably in 1981. Unlike the previous attacks, the Third Battle of Kabamba on 1 January 1985 resulted in the capture of the depot by the NRA's Mobile Brigade under Salim Saleh. Journalist Joshua Kato described Saleh as a "daredevil commander" who was highly admired by his subordinates for his battlefield skills and fearless leadership. Determined to curtail the growing rebel activity, the UNLA high command organized a large search-and-destroy operation to follow the NRA, headed by Lieutenant Colonel (later Colonel) John Charles Ogole. Ogole personally commanded the Special Brigade, also called the "Special Anti-Banditry Brigade" and "50 Special Brigade", a unit of 5,000 selected veteran soldiers with ample access to artillery.

The UNLA pursuit force managed to catch a large NRA section in the Battle of Birembo, but the insurgents managed to escape the trap without heavy losses. According to Museveni, the result of the battle at Birembo demoralized the UNLA's soldiers, as they reportedly realized that the rebels' abilities were growing instead of declining. The NRA continued to successfully evade the UNLA troops, ambushing smaller units of government troops and repulsing more attacks including a major one at Kirema. The UNLA forces subsequently ended their pursuit, allowing the NRA troops to successfully reach rebel-held territories and reorganize. Exploiting the successes at Kabamba, Birembo, and Kirema, the NRA expanded its operations from March 1985. The rebels opened a second front in the Rwenzori Mountains, using the opportunity to also relocate wounded fighters as well as supportive civilians to less dangerous areas. Pro-Obote propagandists attempted to frame this event as a rebel retreat, but the UNLA leadership recognized that the Mobile Brigade under Saleh could operate more freely thanks to the removal of slower NRA contingents from the Luwero Triangle.

== Prelude ==
Brigadier Smith Opon Acak, UNLA chief of staff, remained committed to the destruction of the NRA. He appointed Ogole as the commander of the counter-insurgency operations in the Luwero Triangle. Ogole opted to split his Special Brigade into four contingents, each consisting of a reinforced battalion. These contingents were respectively led by Lieutenant Colonel Joseph Kiyengo, Lieutenant Colonel Tony Kirama, Lieutenant Colonel Eric Odwar, and Lieutenant Colonel Otim.

If Salim Saleh's Mobile Brigade is crushed, that will be the end of the war.

— Colonel John Charles Ogole's radio message to his troops

On 18 June, Ogole's forces left their base at Katikamu near the Kampala–Gulu Highway, and began a security sweep starting at Lwamata. One battalion of the Special Brigade detected traces of the NRA's Mobile Brigade which was marching from Ngoma. The government troops began to follow the rebels; the insurgents failed to shake off their pursuers. Consisting of about 1,500 militants, Saleh's forces crossed the Mayanja River and entered the Singo area, where they unsuccessfully continued their evasion attempts and engaged in a number of skirmishes. Recognizing that they were chasing the NRA's Mobile Brigade, the pursuing UNLA force was reinforced by another UNLA battalion. These units were commanded by Odwar and Kiyengo. A third battalion took up a position at the Mayanja River. The government forces planned to destroy the NRA brigade by using a hammer and anvil strategy, with the pursuing battalions chasing the rebels toward the entrenched UNLA troops at the river. Informed of the situation and confident that he could end the war in a decisive battle, Ogole sent a boastful radio message to his troops.

Meanwhile, the NRA troops had recognized that they were trapped; their signals corps had monitored parts of the UNLA's radio communications, including Ogole's message. On late 20 June, Saleh called for a meeting of his officers, including Patrick Lumumba, Stephen Kashaka, and Fredrick Mugisha at his ad-hoc headquarters. After rearguard commander Rwabwisho gave a situation report, Saleh declared his decision to turn around and confront their pursuers, reportedly declaring "if the enemy wants a fight, let's give it to them". The insurgent leadership thus planned an L-shaped ambush at the government forces' expected axis of advance at Kembogo, a location east of Bukomero and north of Kapeeka. The area was dominated by savanna, with elephant grass that easily concealed people. The ambush's blocking element was formed by the NRA's 3rd Battalion, equipped with RPGs and machine guns. The flank was held by the 5th Battalion. The 1st Battalion formed the reserve, while the 2nd acted as headquarters. Saleh instructed his troops to only open fire when the enemy was about 10 metres (11 yd) away. Furthermore, the rebels dug some shallow shell scrapes, though no trenches.

== Battle ==
On 21 June, the UNLA battalions under Odwar and Kiyengo approached the ambush site in three columns. The vanguard column consisted of a company. As its troops believed that the rebels were in retreat, the company's soldiers were loud and inattentive. They were consequently surprised when the rebels opened fire, and quickly fell back in confusion. The vanguard lost about 50 dead in the initial exchange of fire. Shocked by the NRA ambush, Odwar and Kiyengo had to spend an hour to reorganize and rally their troops. The rebels spent this time to recover guns and ammunition from the battlefield.

The two UNLA battalions then launched a methodical assault on the rebel position, with the infantry advancing under the cover of artillery and machine gun fire. The government troops' support fire was inaccurate, as the rebels were still well-concealed in the tall grass. The NRA militants again allowed UNLA soldiers to closely approach them until opening fire, inflicting more losses on the advancing soldiers. For two hours, heavy fighting raged. With the government troops continuing their attacks, Saleh had to reinforce the 3rd Battalion with the 1st Battalion. However, the UNLA troops then nearly outflanked both units, and were only stopped by the intervention of 5th Battalion troops under "China" Mafundo close to the rebel field headquarters. According to rebel veterans of the clash, the UNLA troops fought fiercely, engaging the insurgents at close range and often battling until death. One rebel officer, Kanyeihama, was killed around this time. Eventually, the government troops started to waver due to their heavy losses, whereupon Saleh ordered the 3rd Battalion under Lumumba to launch a counter-attack. The UNLA battalions were routed by this charge, and the rebels pursued them. Many insurgents hoped to personally kill or capture a fleeing soldier to get their hands on fresh military boots. The pursuit lasted for the rest of the day, and many more UNLA members were killed.

According to historians Tom Cooper and Adrien Fontanellaz as well as researcher Muhoozi Kainerugaba, the UNLA lost 200 to 300 soldiers in the battle, while the NRA suffered only 23 dead. Kato argued that about 350 UNLA soldiers were killed. Fearful of their superior's reaction, Kiyengo and Odwar initially did not contact Ogole until Odwar eventually sent a radio message in which he reportedly described the confrontation as a "catastrophe".

== Analysis ==
Kainerugaba argued that Ogole's overall plan to destroy the NRA's Mobile Brigade in the area of Singo was sensible and plausible, as the territory was more open than the usual insurgent zones and presented a good opportunity to trap the militants. Conversely, Kainerugaba also took the view that the Special Brigade's leadership, particularly Odwar and Kiyengo, underestimated the NRA's capabilities. Similar to veterans of the clash, Kainerugaba lauded Saleh's leadership and planning, viewing it as central to the NRA victory.

The Battle of Kembogo also had a significant impact on the course of the war. Cooper and Fontanellaz described the confrontation as "clear-cut NRA victory" that "delivered a massive psychological blow to the entire UNLA". Journalist Dennis Katungi described the Battle of Kembogo as the Bush War's "titanic encounter" and "the battle, that broke the UNLA's back". According to Kainerugaba, the battle "ranks amongst the most decisive in Ugandan history". The defeat of the Special Brigade, widely regarded as the best unit of the entire military, was especially humiliating and disconcerting to the UNLA's troops. Government soldiers became increasingly frustrated at the Bush War's course, their heavy losses, and Obote's leadership. The Special Brigade itself was close to a mutiny after its defeat at Kembogo. Kato claimed that the clash "led to the overthrow of Milton Obote".

== Aftermath ==
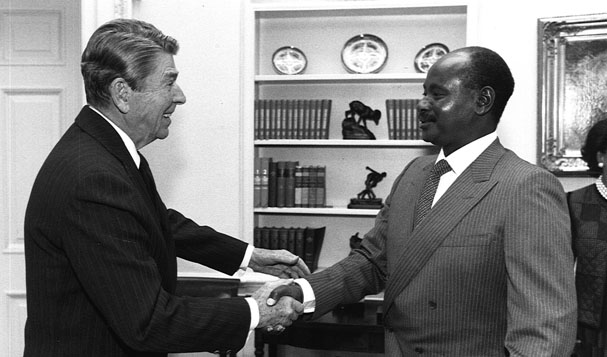
Yoweri Museveni with Ronald Reagan at the White House in October 1987

Along with other setbacks such as the Battle of Rubona, the Battle of Kembogo contributed to the growing frustration in the UNLA's ranks. A widespread mutiny erupted soon after the clash, with soldiers refusing to follow orders in Jinja and Mbuya. Unrest spread, and various political factions attempted to exploit the situation to gain influence in the military. UNLA officers of Acholi ethnicity feared that this development might ultimately result in an ethnic purge of the military; such purges had repeatedly occurred over the previous two decades. To forestall a targeting of the Acholi, a faction of the UNLA opted to seize power for itself. On 27 July, several officers of the UNLA launched a coup which overthrew President Obote. General Tito Okello assumed power in his place. While Eric Odwar supported the coup, his superior Ogole opted to go into exile rather than serve under Okello's regime. The new regime was weak and unstable, and Okello made overtures to anti-Obote rebel groups to form a coalition government and end the fighting. The coup upset many Lango soldiers, which constituted the second-largest ethnic group in the UNLA and were loyal to Obote. The NRM was highly critical of the new government and accused the UNLA of committing atrocities. The UNLF, conscious of its weakening political position, nevertheless pursued negotiations with the NRM. The NRA took advantage of the disruption caused by the coup to further build up its strength.

In August 1985, the NRA launched a series of co-ordinated attacks that resulted in the capture of significant amounts of territory in central and western Uganda. In January 1986, the NRA captured Kampala, allowing the NRM to assume government power and Museveni to become Ugandan President. In 2015, Museveni declared the fighting at Kembogo "a decisive battle that brought down the regime of UPC" (Obote's party) and the area "sacred ground for the NRM because many lives were lost here".
