= Eric Odwar =

Ugandan soldier and rebel

- Born: Orom, Uganda
- Died: 18 January 1987; Camp Kilak, Uganda
- Military career
- Allegiance: Uganda (until 1986); UPDA (1986); HSM (1986–1987)
- Branch: UNLA (until 1986)
- Service years: ?–1987
- Rank: Lieutenant colonel
- Commands: Buffalo Battalion (UNLA); Southern Brigade (UNLA); 90 Brigade (UPDA)
- Conflicts: Uganda–Tanzania War; Ugandan Bush War; Battle of Birembo; Battle of Kembogo; 1985 Ugandan coup d'état; Battle of Kampala; Northern Uganda campaign (January–March 1986); War in Uganda (1986–1994); Battle of Camp Kilak †

Eric Odwar (died 18 January 1987) was an Ugandan military officer and rebel leader who successively served in the Uganda National Liberation Army (UNLA), Uganda People's Democratic Army (UPDA), and Holy Spirit Movement (HSM). He played a substantial role in the Ugandan Bush War, being one of the main counter-insurgency commanders of the government during this conflict. In 1985, he and other UNLA commanders overthrew the government of Milton Obote. A few months later, the National Resistance Army (NRA) won the Bush War, whereupon Odwar fled into exile and helped to organize a rebellion against the new Ugandan government. At first, he led a unit of the UPDA insurgent group, but later switched allegiance to the HSM. He was killed in combat in January 1987.

== Biography ==
=== Early life and UNLA career ===
Odwar was an ethnic Acholi and born at Orom in northern Uganda. In April 1979, Tanzanian forces and the Uganda National Liberation Army (UNLA), a coalition of armed rebel groups, overthrew the regime of Ugandan President Idi Amin. This resulted in widespread unrest, with fleeing Uganda Army troops looting across the country. Alongside Stephenson Ojukwu and Kenneth Banya, Odwar helped to deploy UNLA troops in eastern Acholiland and thus protected the local communities from the looting soldiers. Odwar subsequently rose in the ranks of the UNLA. At one point, Odwar befriended Salim Saleh who subsequently became his long-time opponent.

In 1980, a civil war known as the "Ugandan Bush War" broke out; Odwar remained loyal to the government and continued to serve in the UNLA. By 1983, he had been promoted to major and commanded the "Buffalo Battalion", a sub-unit of the Special Brigade of John Charles Ogole. He eventually rose to second-in-command of the Special Brigade, a UNLA unit which focused on destroying the National Resistance Army (NRA) rebel group. At some point, he was promoted to lieutenant colonel.

In January 1985, Odwar took part in the Battle of Birembo. Afterward, Odwar continued to command a battalion during Ogole's repeated attempts to find and destroy the NRA's main unit, the Mobile Brigade. In June, the UNLA discovered and cornered the Mobile Brigade in the Singo area; Odwar and Joseph Kiyengo led their battalions to pursue the rebels. On 21 June, however, the Mobile Brigade under his former friend Salim Saleh ambushed and heavily defeated the units of Odwar as well as Kiyengo in the Battle of Kembogo. After his troops were routed, Odwar allegedly spent several days hiding in the bush to evade the rebels. Upon returning to safety, Kiyengo and Odwar initially did not contact Ogole as they feared their superior's reaction. Odwar eventually sent a radio message in which he reportedly described the Battle of Kembogo as a "catastrophe".

After the repeated setbacks against the rebels, unrest spread in the UNLA and resulted in a mutiny. Worried that the chaos among the military could result in a purge aimed at Acholi soldiers, a faction of UNLA officers launched a coup and overthrew President Obote in July 1985. Odwar sided with the pro-coup forces, and led his troops to oust pro-Obote forces from Hoima, Masindi, Fort Portal, Mbarara and Masaka. In the process, he contacted Saleh, offering him and the NRA arms, ammunition and military uniforms for a ceasefire as well as their tacit support. The rebel commander agreed. On 27 July, the pro-coup forces captured Ugandan capital Kampala and installed General Tito Okello as new president. After the successful coup, Odwar was appointed head of the UNLA's Southern Brigade. However, the UNLA was left severely weakened by the coup and its aftermath, with many soldiers deserting, defecting to insurgent groups, or fleeing into exile.

Initially, Okello's new regime reached out to the various rebel groups around the country, offering them participaction in the government in return for an end of their resistance. Based on the previous agreement between Odwar and Saleh, the NRA initially appeared to also cooperate with the new authorities. However, the NRA quickly renegaded on any agreements to launch new offensives, seizing large parts of Uganda. New peace talks were initiated, but Odwar reportedly recognized that the NRA was merely using these to prepare its next offensive. As his warnings about these fears were ignored by Okello's government, Odwar and Major John Kilama started to plot a new coup, but this plan became obsolete when the NRA soon resumed its attacks. In January 1986, the NRA attacked Kampala. Odwar led parts of the local UNLA garrison, including the defense of Summit View. On 26 January, the NRA's 11th Battalion overran Odwar's forces, forcing him to order a retreat. After capturing Kampala, NRA leader Yoweri Museveni was declared president of Uganda.

=== Rebel activity and death ===
After the NRM seized state power, Odwar and several other UNLA officers continued their attempts to resist. They tried to maintain power in northern Uganda, with Odwar taking control of the UNLA forces blocking the Kampala–Gulu Highway. Despite these efforts, the NRA overran the remaining UNLA holdouts from February to March 1986, thus ending the Ugandan Bush War. Afterward, many UNLA leaders fled into exile, and prepared to resume their resistance. Odwar became a founding member of the Uganda People's Democratic Army (UPDA), a rebel group formed by ex-UNLA commanders to overthrow the new NRM government during a rebellion from mid-1986. As part of the UPDA, Odwar was appointed commander of the 90 Brigade which mainly operated in the area around Kitgum. His troops were based at Oryebo near Namokora.

After some initial successes, the UPDA began to decline; Odwar contemplated to quit the insurgency. He reportedly contacted his old friend and opponent, NRA commander Salim Saleh, and tried to negotiate a ceasefire. NRA Deputy Defense Minister Fred Rwigyema later claimed that the two sides actually agreed to a meeting for further peace talks, but this never took place due to Odwar's eventual death. The gradual collapse of the UPDA allowed a self-proclaimed prophetess, Alice Auma, to expand her militant Holy Spirit Movement (HSM) by recruiting dissatisfied UPDA fighters. Around December 1986, Odwar left the frontlines to visit his family in Sudan; upon returning, he discovered that the 90 Brigade had pledged loyalty to the HSM. The officer became curious about the alleged prophetess and her "supernatural powers". Upon meeting her at Orom, Odwar became convinced of her cause and asked to join her army. Auma initially refused as she regarded soldiers like him as the cause of Uganda's ills. After three days, she relented and granted him the post of platoon commander, a major demotion from his previous ranks. Despite this, Odwar was reportedly impressed by Auma's rhetoric and military capabilities, and praised her in a conversation with another UPDA commander.

In January 1987, Auma led the HSM to launch a major attack on Camp Kilak, an important NRA base. The fighting lasted four days, resulting in heavy losses on both sides. Though the insurgents initially overran the base and routed the NRA garrison, government forces counter-attacked and eventually repelled the HSM. Odwar was killed on the battle's final day on 18 January 1987. At the time of his death, he was described as "one of the rebels’ most experienced officers" by the Los Angeles Times.

== Personal life ==
In one alleged instance, Odwar kidnapped a woman named Jane from a secondary school and forced her to become his wife. She managed to escape at the end of the Ugandan Bush War. By 1986, his family lived in Sudan.
