= Lwamata =

- Location in Uganda; Placement on map is approximate
- Coordinates: 00°53′15″N 31°49′09″E
- Country: Uganda
- Region: Central Region
- District: Kiboga District
- Town: Lwamata Town Council
- County: Ssingo
- Subcounty: Dwaniro sub-county
- Elevation: 3,900 ft (1,200 m)

Lwamata is a town in Ssingo County, Kiboga District, in the Central Region of Uganda.

== Location ==
The town is located on the Kampala–Hoima Road, approximately 9 kilometres (6 mi), southeast of the town of Kiboga, the location of the district headquarters. This is about 115 kilometres (71 mi) northwest of Kampala, the capital and largest city in the country. The geographical coordinates of Lwamata are 0°53'15.0"N, 31°49'09.0"E (Latitude:0.887494; Longitude:31.819173).

== Overview ==
Lwamata was one of the areas where the National Resistance Army guerrillas initiated their early recruitment campaigns. A war memorial was elected in the town, to commemorate the lives that were lost.

== See also ==
- Kiboga
- Bukomero
- Kiboga District
