= 1985 Ugandan coup d'état =

Military takeover in Uganda

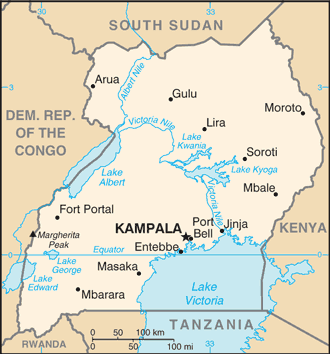
| Date | July 27, 1985 |
| Location | Kampala, Uganda |
| Result | Coup successful |

Belligerents
| Government of Uganda | Acholi faction of UNLA |

Commanders and leaders
| Milton Obote | Tito Okello; Basilio Olara Okello |

Casualties and losses
- At least 10 killed

The 1985 Ugandan coup d'état was an ethnically motivated military takeover in Uganda involving dissident Acholi elements within the Uganda National Liberation Army (UNLA), led by Brigadier Basilio Olara Okello, which successfully ousted the second Milton Obote government. The army promptly named General Tito Okello Lutwa as President of the Military Council, only for him to be ousted six months later by Yoweri Museveni and his National Resistance Army (NRA).

== Background ==
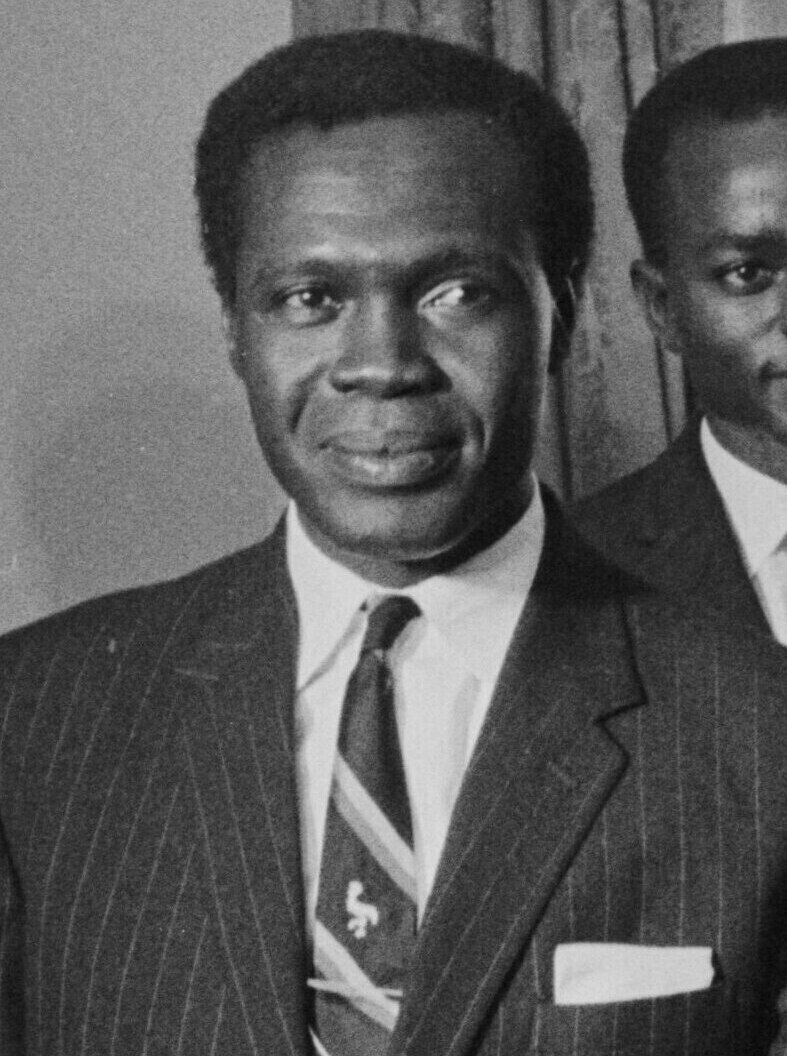
Milton Obote (pictured 1962) regained power after the disputed 1980 Ugandan general election.

Following the overthrow of dictator Idi Amin by the Tanzania People's Defence Force (TPDF) and the Uganda National Liberation Army (UNLA) rebel coalition, a new government led by President Yusuf Lule was formed by the Uganda National Liberation Front (UNLF) and the Tanzanians. However, the UNLF government proved to be weak and unstable, and quickly became embroiled in a series of crises. As he tried to exert his power, Lule was removed from office by the UNLF's powerful National Consultative Committee on 20 June 1979. His successor, Godfrey Binaisa, was also deposed in May 1980, whereupon the UNLF's Military Commission assumed control of Uganda. Meanwhile, remnants of Amin's Uganda Army launched an insurgency in the north, starting a civil war which became known as the "Ugandan Bush War". Even as violent unrest spread, the Military Commission was supposed to oversee the 1980 elections. Four parties participated in the elections, namely the Uganda People's Congress (UPC), the Uganda Patriotic Movement (UPM), the Conservative Party, and the Democratic Party. UPC candidate Milton Obote, who previously governed the country from 1966 to 1971 before being deposed by Amin, won with 40% of the votes. However, UPM candidate Yoweri Museveni disputed the results, claiming the elections were rigged and influenced by Tanzania to reinstate Obote.

Consequently, Museveni formed the Popular Resistance Army (PRA) insurgent group and entered the Bush War. Other political factions also rebelled over the election results. Eventually, the PRA merged with another rebel group and formed the National Resistance Movement (NRM), whose armed wing was dubbed the National Resistance Army (NRA). The NRA was primarily composed of members of the country's southern tribes who opposed President Obote's rule, including from the Nkole and Kigezi.

The newly elected Obote administration, inheriting an ineffective military due to the disintegration of Amin's army during the liberation war, sought to rectify this by allocating much of the national budget to the military. As a result, the Ministry of Defense consistently had the highest estimated expenditure compared to the other ministries throughout Obote's tenure. Due to the ongoing insurgencies, the government depended greatly upon the military for counteraction, leading to a constant military presence. This dashed hopes that following Amin's overthrow, the military's sway in Ugandan politics would be diminished.

The Uganda National Liberation Army (UNLA) after Amin's regime saw the disproportionate representation of soldiers from the Acholi, Lango, and Ankole as many western Uganda soldiers left to join Museveni's insurgency, making the UNLA become dominated by the northerners. Following the death of General Oyite Ojok in December 1982, a unifying figure within the army, ethnic tensions escalated, particularly between the Acholi and Lango tribes. Discontent within Acholi ranks, which had already been simmering due to perceived marginalization and unfair treatment, were further fueled when Obote appointed a Lango as General Ojok's successor, Brigadier Smith Opon Acak, which also angered the Acholi-dominated officer corps. His attempts to quell dissent among the officers, including surveillance and formation of a predominantly Langi paramilitary force, proved ineffective and only served to exacerbate tensions.

== Prelude ==
Though the UNLA gradually managed to contain or defeat several rebel groups around the country, the NRA continued to pose a significant issue. In an attempt to finally defeat the group, the UNLA high command ordered Lieutenant Colonel John Charles Ogole to oversee anti-NRA operations. Ogole was a veteran officer who had led successful counter-insurgency operations against other groups, and his "Special Brigade" was regarded as one of the most effective units of the UNLA. Ogole achieved some success, but was ultimately unable to eliminate the NRA.

On 21 June 1985, two battalions of UNLA's Special Brigade, led by Eric Odwar and Joseph Kiyengo, were ambushed and defeated by the NRA's Mobile Brigade in the Battle of Kembogo. Odwar termed the clash a "catastrophe"; historians Tom Cooper and Adrien Fontanellaz argued that the Special Brigade's defeat "delivered a massive psychological blow to the entire UNLA". In the same month, the NRA won another victory in the smaller Battle of Rubona. These setbacks demoralized the UNLA's troops, especially the Acholi soldiers who felt that they were suffering heavy losses for no gains. The military became increasingly critical of Obote's leadership.

The unrest started to escalate soon after the Battle of Kembogo, as UNLA units mutinied in Jinja and Mbuya.

== Coup attempt ==
The coup attempt was initially plotted by senior Acholi officers who felt sidelined in the army, discussing their plans through meetings held in places such as the Kampala Club and Apollo Hotel. Despite state intelligence reporting on 25 July 1985, that army officials seemed to be organizing something, President Obote took no preventative action and dismissed the reports, believing General Tito Okello and Brigadier Basilio Olara Okello lacked the ambition to stage a coup.

In the lead-up to the coup, Brigadier Basilio recruited militias under the guise of fighting Karamojong cattle rustlers, integrating many Acholi youths into the army. Under the pretext of addressing cattle rustling, his forces, including the northern army brigade he commanded, moved towards the capital of Kampala, unaware of the full extent of their mission. President Obote issued an arrest warrant for the brigadier and a government official requested help from the North Korean military attaché, but it was too late.

At about 11:00 on July 27, armed troops in trucks and jeeps appeared on the streets of Kampala, stunning the civilian populace. Encountering little to no resistance, the troops drove to specific locations and installations, stepped out of their trucks and fired their weapons into the air, inciting panic and causing most people to flee. They seized control of key government offices, including the parliament building, post office, radio station, and central bank, as well as the UPC's headquarters. Within three hours, the streets in the city were clear of everyone except the putschists.

By sunset, initial resistance from government forces gave way to intensive clashes. The ensuing fighting resulted in widespread looting as looters ransacked shops and stole cars, causing significant destruction in Kampala. The chaos led to the temporary closure of the nation's borders and Entebbe Airport, although 300 foreigners, including 62 American nationals, were allowed to leave the country. The looting continued until the afternoon of July 29, by which point much of the city had been ransacked.

Lieutenant Ochala Walter announced the "total military coup" and end of Obote's "tribalistic rule" on Uganda radio, imploring NRA leader Yoweri Museveni to join efforts in the nation's reconstruction. Captain Kenneth Chana read the same message in Kiswahili. Following the successful coup, the new military government suspended the constitution, dissolved parliament, and dismissed all government ministers. A temporary 12-hour curfew from 6 PM to 6 AM was imposed to restore order and security in the aftermath of the upheaval. On July 29, General Tito Okello was inaugurated as the new president of Uganda.

President Obote fled to Kenya while his cabinet sought sanctuary in Tanzania. Chris Rwakasisi, Obote's security chief, was arrested while trying to escape to Kenya. Meanwhile, Obote's vice president and Defense Minister, Paul Muwanga, was named Prime Minister of the country. Idi Amin, who had been living in exile in Saudi Arabia after being ousted, expressed his desire to return to the country. His wishes were firmly rejected by the government however.

== Aftermath ==
The new nine-man military council, headed by General Tito Okello, sought reproachment with Museveni's insurgent group and opened negotiations. The general also promised to end tribalism, hold free and fair elections, and uphold human rights, the latter of which he broke as human rights violations continued under his rule. Mediated by Kenyan President Daniel Moi, an agreement was reached between the two parties in Nairobi, Kenya, which stipulated a ceasefire later that year. Despite this however, the NRA violated the agreement and resumed fighting on January 17, 1986, eventually capturing Kampala by January 26, 1986, and forcing General Tito Okello to flee north to Sudan. Afterwards, the insurgents set up a new government with Museveni assuming leadership of Uganda.
