= Uganda People's Democratic Army =

Ugandan rebel organization from 1986 to 1988

- Leader: Justine Odong Latek
- Dates active: March 1986 – June 1988
- Ideology: Acholi interests

The Uganda People's Democratic Army (UPDA) was a rebel group operating in northern Uganda from March 1986 to June 1988.

== History ==
In January 1986, the government of Ugandan President Tito Okello was overthrown by the rebel National Resistance Army (NRA) under the command of Yoweri Museveni, which took the capital city of Kampala. By March 1986, NRA forces had occupied the traditional land of the Acholi people in northern Uganda, from which President Okello came. In the same month, former Uganda National Liberation Army (UNLA) soldiers, which was the military of Uganda from 1980 to 1986, had sought sanctuary in southern Sudan formed the rebel Uganda People's Democratic Army (UPDA) with the goal to force the NRA out of northern Uganda and reinstate the former government.

By late 1986, the UPDA had proved unable to retake towns it initially had captured and hold on to captured territory. Though it controlled much of the countryside, that did not mitigate or prevent the group's impending defeat. Many UPDA rebels deserted, and smaller units splintered into semi-banditry groups. Many ethnic Acholis refused to accept the logical conclusion that resistance was futile and began to support the Holy Spirit Movement of Alice Auma, which promised a millenarian vision of earthly paradise or similar chiliastic groups that had sprung up, including the Uganda People's Democratic Christian Army led by Joseph Kony that would later become the Lord's Resistance Army (LRA).

After a year of increasingly desperate operations, including fierce battles among the various Acholi rebel groups for resources, the UPDA signed an accord with the NRA-led government on 3 June 1988 that called for an end to the conflict and a democratic government. The negotiations were exceptional in that they were carried out by military officers of the UPDA and the NRA. The political wing of the UPDA and the National Resistance Movement were excluded from the talks. While the UPDA co-founder Justine Odong Latek refused to accept the accord and joined the LRA, most of his officers realized that their military situation was hopeless and, by early 1989, the UPDA had ceased to exist.

== Structure ==
The UPDA had an high command, led by Justine Odong Latek. At the time of its foundation, the UPDA was organized into two divisions, split into several brigades. By 1987, the group claimed to have 15,000 members, including 1,000 Karamojong and Former Uganda National Army militants. Though the group included many ex-UNLA veterans who had considerable combat experience, the UPDA units were usually much weaker than their respective names suggested. The known units included:

- First Division - commanded by Lieutenant Colonel John Angelo Okello Okello, later Joseph Obonyo; operated in Gulu area
  - 50 Brigade - commanded by Captain Peter Okello; operated in southern Kitgum District
  - 80 Brigade - commanded by division leader John Angelo Okello Okello
  - 100 Spearhead Brigade - commanded by Major Mike Kilama; operated in Aswa County
  - 115 Brigade - commanded by Captain Mark Lapyem; operated in Nwoya County
  - 120 Brigade - commanded by Lieutenant Colonel Atochon Oliver North; based at Nebbi
  - 130 Mobile Brigade - commanded by Major Walter Ochora
- Second Division - commanded by Major Nick Kibwota; operated around Kitgum
  - 60 Brigade - commanded by Captain Richard Nyeko in 1986; transferred to First Division and led by Major Mazzoldi Lubangakene by 1987
  - 70 Brigade - commanded by Lieutenant Colonel Stevenson Ojukwu, later Lieutenant Colonel Stephen Oydek
  - 90 Brigade - commanded by Lieutenant Colonel Eric Odwar; based at Oryebo near Namokora
