= Battle of Kampala =

1986 battle of the Ugandan Bush War

- Part of the Ugandan Bush War
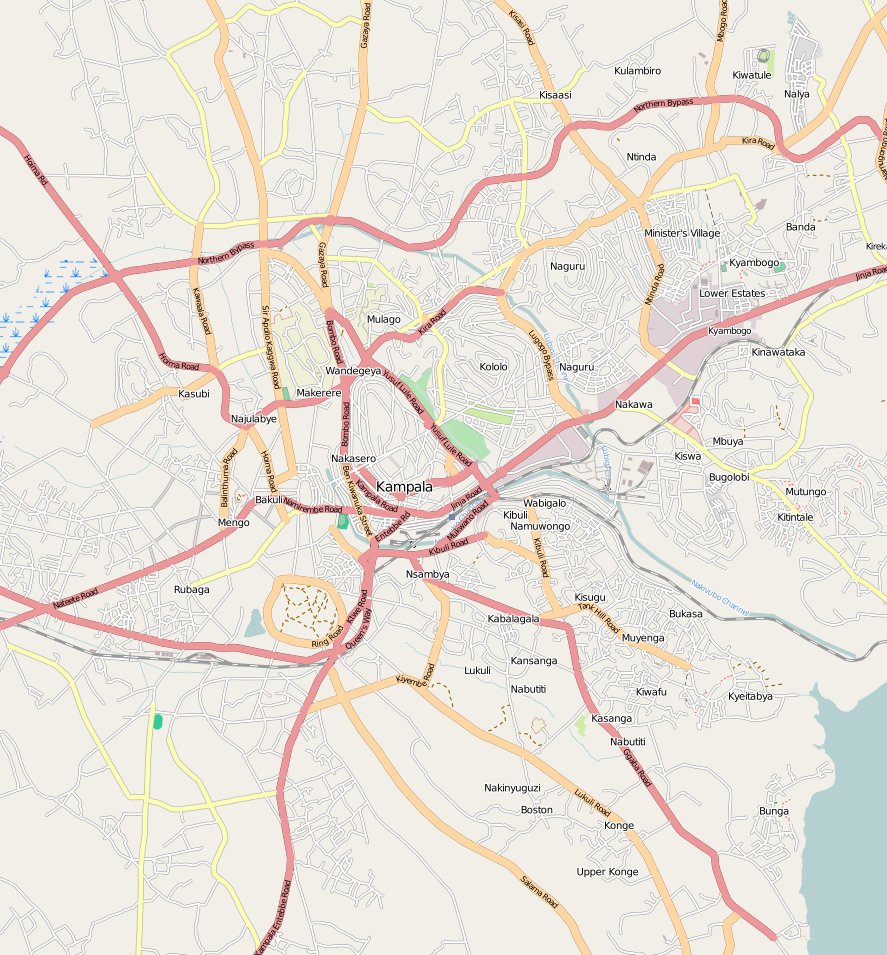
- Map of Kampala
Date	17–26 January 1986
Location	Kampala, Uganda
Result	National Resistance Movement victory
Territorial changes	Kampala captured by the National Resistance Army

Belligerents
Uganda	National Resistance Movement

Commanders and leaders
Tito Okello; Zeddy Maruru (surrendered); Fred Okecho (surrendered); Samuel Nanyumba (surrendered); Eric Odwar; John Kilama; Joseph Obonyo; Isaac Lumago; George Nkwanga †	Yoweri Museveni; Salim Saleh; Fred Mugisha; Patrick Lumumba; Stanley Muhangi; Chefe Ali; Jet Mwebaze; Matayo Kyaligonza

Units involved
Uganda National Liberation Army (UNLA): Southern Brigade; Air wing; Former Uganda National Army (FUNA); Uganda Freedom Army (UFM); FEDEMU	National Resistance Army (NRA): 1st Battalion; 3rd Battalion; 5th Battalion; 7th Battalion; 11th Battalion; Special Force

Strength
12,000+	c. 9,600

Casualties and losses
c. 80 killed c. 3,000 captured	c. 20 killed 1 armoured personnel carrier destroyed

The Battle of Kampala was a battle of the Ugandan Bush War that took place from 17 to 26 January 1986 in which forces of the National Resistance Army (NRA) attacked and captured the Ugandan capital, Kampala, from the Uganda National Liberation Army (UNLA). As a result, the Ugandan government was deposed and replaced by a new one under NRA leader Yoweri Museveni.

In 1981, Museveni initiated an insurgency in Uganda against the government, which was controlled by the Uganda National Liberation Front (UNLF). He soon joined the nascent National Resistance Movement (NRM) and took control of its armed wing, the NRA. In 1985, the NRA inflicted several key defeats on the UNLF's armed wing, the UNLA, leaving the Ugandan capital, Kampala, vulnerable to attack. Feeling pressured, the UNLF government led by President Tito Okello pursued negotiations with the NRM. The resulting peace agreement failed to end the conflict, and Okello amassed a large force of UNLA troops and allied militias to garrison Kampala in preparation for an attack, though its effectiveness was weakened by low morale, internal friction, and subterfuge. On 17 January 1986, the NRA began advancing on Kampala. They managed to occupy territory around the city, but the UNLA stemmed their advance by placing an artillery battery at a strategic roundabout. On 24 January, the UNLA withdrew its battery, and the NRA began its main attack.

On the following day the NRA besieged several UNLA installations in Kampala, and by evening had secured Republic House, the UNLA headquarters. On 26 January, the NRA captured Radio Uganda, but 1,000 UNLA troops from Entebbe broke through a roadblock and began advancing towards the city. Museveni and his chief of staff, Salim Saleh, redeployed their forces to counter the threat, in the process opening a gap in their cordon around Kampala and allowing many UNLA troops to escape. Okello fled in a helicopter and flew to Sudan. In the evening an NRA battalion ambushed the UNLA troops advancing from Entebbe while a company moved to attack their rear, forcing them to capitulate and ending the battle. On 29 January Museveni was sworn in as President of Uganda. The UNLA attempted to regroup in northern Uganda, but collapsed in the following months after being subject to further NRA attacks.

== Background ==
In April 1979, Tanzanian forces and the Uganda National Liberation Army (UNLA), a coalition of armed rebel groups united under the Uganda National Liberation Front (UNLF), deposed the President of Uganda, Idi Amin. A new UNLF government was installed, but it was weak and exercised little control over the country. This was in part due to the UNLF's and its army's own internal divisions. The several-hundred strong Kikosi Maalum group was loyal to Milton Obote, who had served as president before Amin took power. Yoweri Museveni controlled the Front for National Salvation, which had about 3,000 members. Over time, power shifted to pro-Obote elements in the government and the army. Obote assumed power in 1980 through a disputed election, and ruled through repressive methods, including the incarceration and killing of dissidents. In February 1981, Museveni and a small band of rebels began attacking UNLA forces, signalling their entry in the Ugandan Bush War. Shortly thereafter a new rebel coalition was organised as the National Resistance Movement (NRM). Museveni was made vice-chairman of the National Resistance Council, the group's political body, and Chairman of the High Command of the National Resistance Army (NRA), the Movement's armed organ. By mid-1985, the NRA had been pushed out of its strongholds, and Museveni retired to Sweden. Regardless, the group inflicted a major defeat on the UNLA in the Battle of Kembogo, causing great frustration and unrest among the security forces.

On 27 July, several officers of the UNLA launched a coup which overthrew President Obote. General Tito Okello assumed power in his place. The new regime was weak and unstable, and Okello made overtures to anti-Obote rebel groups to form a coalition government and end the fighting. The coup upset many Lango soldiers, which constituted the second-largest ethnic group in the UNLA and were loyal to Obote. The NRM was highly critical of the new government and accused the UNLA of committing atrocities. The UNLF, conscious of its weakening political position, nevertheless pursued negotiations with the NRM. Museveni took advantage of the disruption caused by the coup to return to East Africa and rebuild the NRA. In August the NRA launched a series of co-ordinated attacks that resulted in the capture of significant amounts of territory in central and western Uganda. In late September, the NRA laid siege to the UNLA troops in the provincial centre of Masaka and, soon thereafter, the town of Mbarara, both key urban areas in southern Uganda.

In October, Museveni warned that, in the event of the failure negotiations ongoing between the NRM and the UNLF in Nairobi, "the NRA would take Kampala by force". On 3 December, Okello's government released a document allegedly seized from the NRA which carried an order from Museveni to the NRA Chief of Staff, Salim Saleh, to prepare to attack the Ugandan capital, Kampala, if a peace agreement did not materialise. The NRM did not comment on the disclosure. On 10 December, Masaka's garrison surrendered to the NRA. On 17 December, the UNLF and NRM concluded talks and signed the Nairobi Peace Agreement. The accord nominally ended the war and declared Okello and Museveni President and Vice President of Uganda, respectively, and required the demilitarisation of Kampala until a new army could be established. It also carried a provision which stipulated that one belligerent could disregard the agreement if the other was found to be violating human rights. The NRM accused the UNLA of failing to respect Ugandans' rights, and the NRA continued fighting. On 31 December the UNLF government accused the NRA of failing to uphold its terms of the peace agreement by launching attacks, impeding the flow of food to the Mbarara garrison, and refraining from nominating representatives to coordinate further peace measures with the government. The UNLA forces at Mbarara capitulated soon thereafter.

== Prelude ==
Following their victories, the NRA was able to greatly expand its manpower, and gained access to important military equipment. In contrast, the UNLA's remaining forces were increasingly suffering from defections, low morale, and internal divisions along ethnic lines. The NRA's success at Masaka and Mbarara also solidified their control of the centre and south-western sections of the country and left Kampala vulnerable to attack. To take advantage of its improving military situation, the NRA High Command decided to launch an offensive to capture the city. Saleh drew up the plans of attack. About 9,600 fighters were allocated for this operation, many of which were UNLA defectors from the Masaka garrison. At the same time, the NRA's 9th, 15th, and 19th Battalions blocked the Masinda–Hoima Road, so that UNLA units which were still active in northern Uganda could not reinforce Kampala. Fearing that Zairian dictator Mobutu Sese Seko might sent his army to aid the UNLA, Museveni stationed the 21st Battalion under Benon Tumukunde at Kasese to fend off any Zairian attempt to reinforce Kampala.

Realising that the rebels would launch an attack on the capital, President Okello attempted to bolster Kampala's garrison by enlisting the aid of anti-NRA militias, including the Former Uganda National Army (FUNA), the Uganda Freedom Army, and the Federal Democratic Movement of Uganda (FEDEMU). In truth, many of these alleged anti-NRA fighters were NRA spies and acted as a fifth column; the entire Uganda Freedom Army was probably a front organisation of the NRA. In addition, FUNA suffered from extensive indiscipline, and harassed civilians in the capital despite denials by its commander Isaac Lumago. Kampala's garrison was at least 12,000-strong. The UNLA also established a battery at Summit View on Kololo, a hill overlooking Kampala. (Note: According to NRA fighter Pecos Kutesa, North Korean technicians helped the UNLA to set up the artillery at Summit View. According to the Africa Contemporary Record, all North Korean advisors reportedly left Uganda in August 1985.) Troops were deployed to strategic locations, including the Radio Uganda building, the Uganda Television building, the Nile Mansions, the Uganda International Conference Centre, and the Parliament building. UNLA forces also garrisoned the State House in Entebbe to the south-east. The garrison at Summit View was commanded by Lieutenant Colonel Eric Odwar, head of the Southern Brigade, the forces in Kampala's center by Colonel John Kilama, and the troops guarding the Kampala–Entebbe Road by Colonel Joseph Obonyo.

== Battle ==
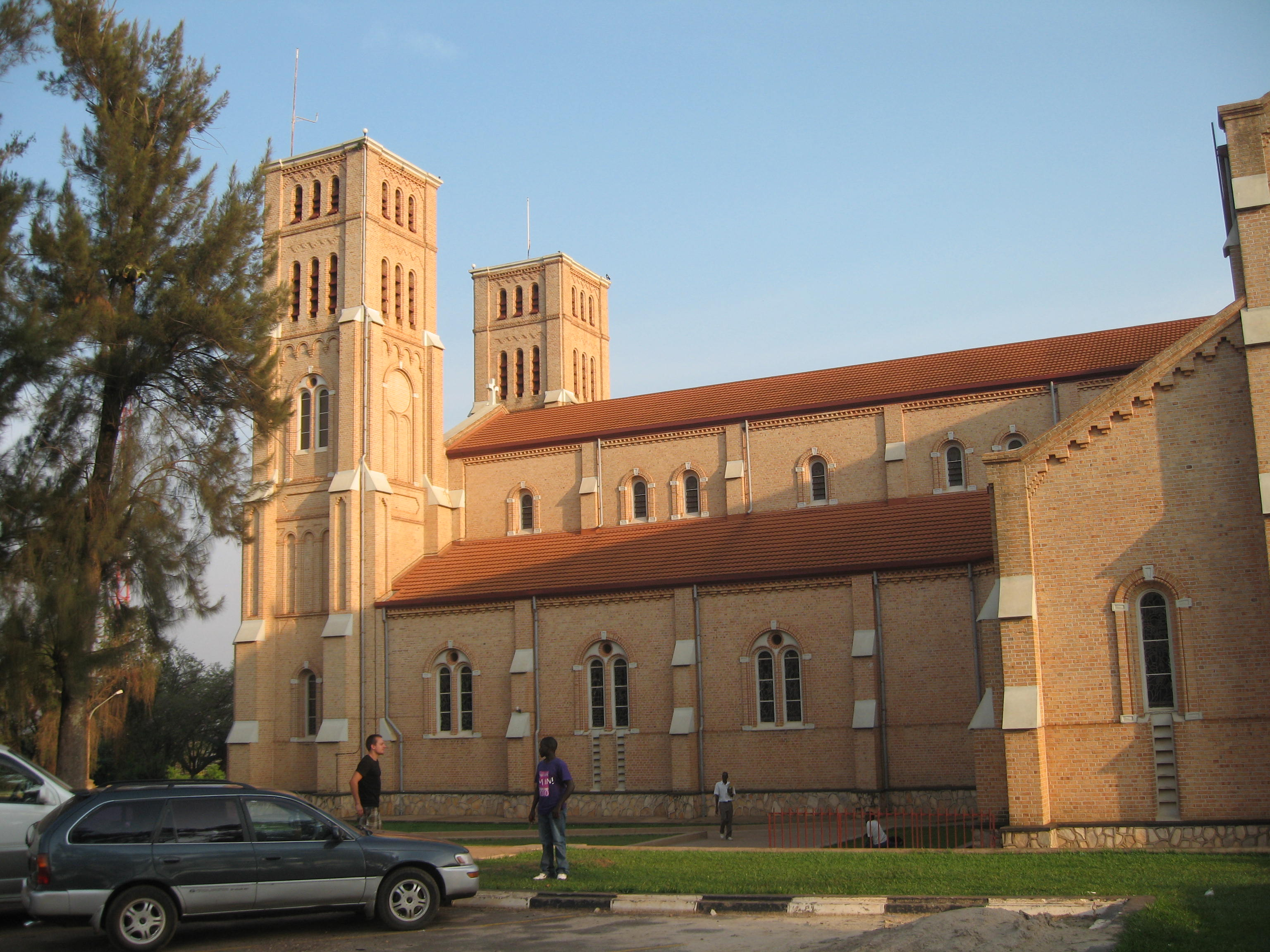
Suspected to harbour NRA fighters, Rubaga Cathedral was targeted by UNLA artillery on 20 January.

On 17 January 1986, the NRA began advancing on Kampala. The NRA's 1st, 3rd, 5th and 11th Battalions moved along the main axis of attack from Masaka, while the 7th Battalion under Stanley Muhangi and Matayo Kyaligonza travelled down Hoima Road towards the city. UNLA troops were sent to intercept them south-west of the city, but they withdrew and ignored their officers' orders for them to return. On 20 January, the UNLA's battery began shelling western Kampala. The bombardment targeted the Rubaga Cathedral, which the UNLA suspected had been infiltrated by the NRA. By 22 January, the NRA's 7th Battalion had occupied Nansana, while the 1st, 3rd, 5th and 11th Battalions had taken up position on Mutundwe, another hill overlooking Kampala. UNLA and FUNA troops blocked their advance by placing artillery—including anti-aircraft guns— at the Busega roundabout, where the Masaka and Fort Portal roads entered the capital. The commander of the NRA's 1st Battalion, Pecos Kutesa, in a fit of anxiety claimed he was ill; Museveni ordered him to remain at the local NRA headquarters while his second-in-command, Fred Mugisha took charge of the unit on the front lines. On 23 January, the government forces' artillery bombarded the areas in and around Kampala where the NRA was present, including Rubaga, Lubigi, and Busega. The NRA's artillery, mainly lighter guns and mortars, responded; "fierce artillery duels" erupted, lasting for the entire day. In the evening, government forces fled from Nateete, allowing the NRA to capture it without opposition.

On early 24 January, a UNLA Bell helicopter made several attempts at disrupting the NRA artillery in the swampy area near Busega, bombing their positions until being driven away by the rebels' anti-aircraft fire. After the helicopter's unsuccessful attacks, the UNLA troops withdrew from the Busega roundabout despite its well-defendable position. The government soldiers left a 14.5mm gun behind as they retreated from the roundabout. A band of NRA soldiers led by Kasirye Gwanga reconnoitred the area, and, discovering that it had been abandoned, radioed a message to their headquarters. Saleh and Museveni subsequently ordered their forces to attack. The 1st Battalion and 3rd Battalion were given the responsibility of conducting the main thrust into Kampala and equipped with most of the NRA's support weapons. The former pressed forward with the latter in support, and by nightfall had secured Rubaga. The 11th Battalion moved in behind them, while the 7th Battalion seized Ndeeba. The NRA encountered little resistance in this area, aside of a skirmish at the Rubaga-Ndeeba road junction. Upon hearing that his troops had entered Kampala, Museveni relocated his headquarters from Mpigi to Trinity College Nabbingo. Meanwhile, three young NRA guerrillas reconnoitred UNLA defences on Kololo under the guise of playing football. For the most part, the UNLA and FUNA soldiers defending the city were demotivated and poorly led; many deserted or outright defected to the NRA.

On 25 January, the NRA's 7th Battalion attacked the UNLA barracks at Makindye and the 3rd Battalion assaulted the Lubiri barracks, while the 1st Battalion acted as a reserve. NRA artillery positioned on Mutundwe traded fire with the UNLA battery at Summit View. Fighting at Lubiri was severe; the UNLA garrison successfully blunted an attempt by NRA troops to scale the barracks wall, so the latter resorted to besieging the installation with grenades and machine guns. All foreign missions in the city closed their facilities. The governments of the United States and the United Kingdom advised their nationals in the capital to seek shelter indoors. Radio Uganda broadcast a request from Okello to the NRA for a ceasefire and for the implementation of the Nairobi Peace Agreement. In the afternoon NRA artillery struck an armoury near the UNLA's headquarters, Republic House, causing a large series of explosions. As the fighting for Lubiri barracks raged, the 1st Battalion captured the Bulange, seized the Bakuli junction after heavy fighting, and advanced toward the city centre. Republic House was captured early in the evening by the 1st and 3rd Battalions. At about 21:00, a platoon of the 3rd Battalion managed to successfully climb over the wall at the Lubiri barracks, finding the location to have been abandoned by UNLA forces. Saleh moved to join his troops at the front line and encamped at Natete.

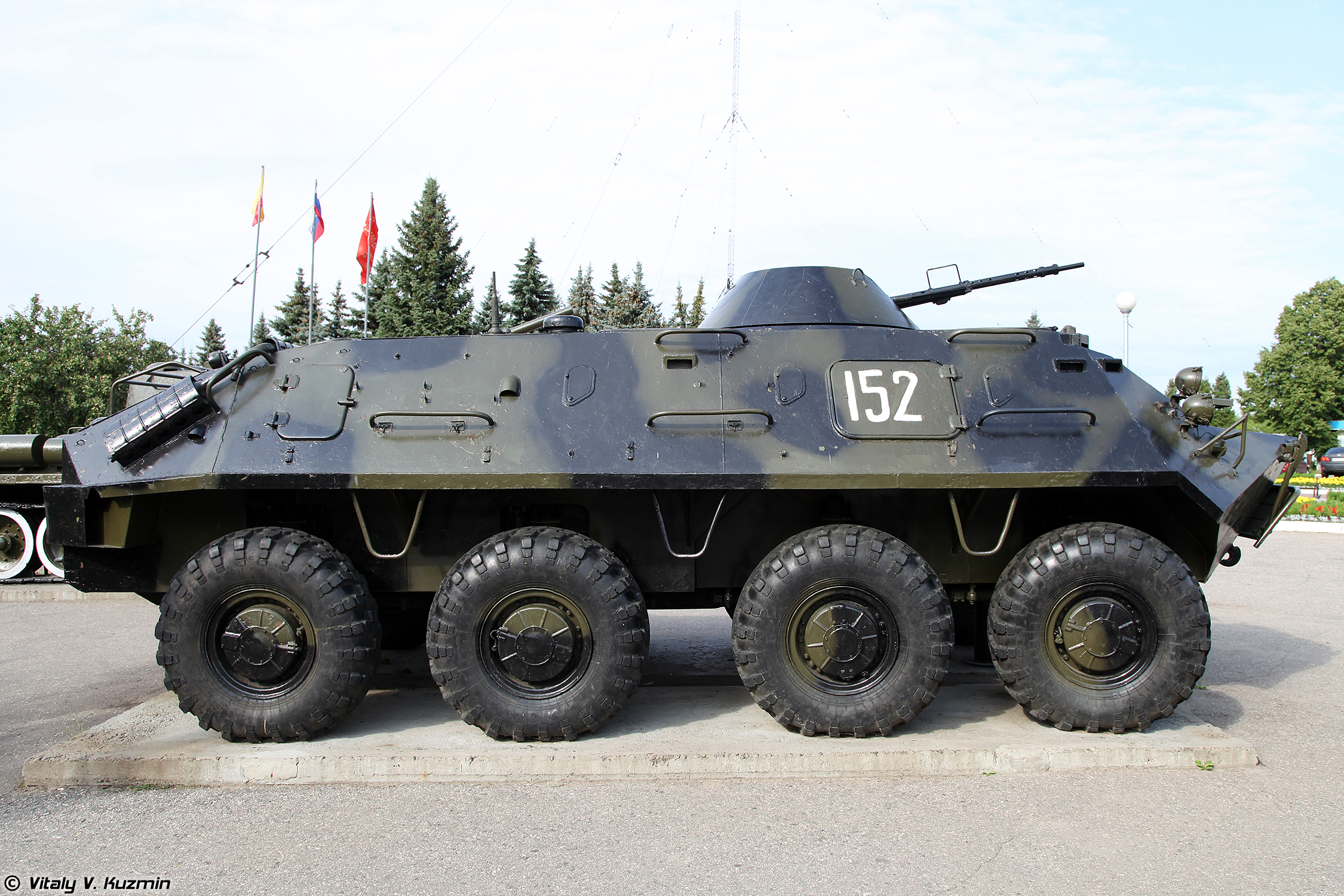
One of the NRA's BTR-60 armoured personnel carriers (example pictured) was destroyed during the battle.

On 26 January, Museveni went to Republic House, moving his command post to its canteen. He was greeted by Saleh, who briefed him on the status of the battle. The NRA's 1st Battalion was subsequently ordered to secure the city centre. Along Parliament Avenue an NRA BTR-60 armoured personnel carrier (APC) was struck by a UNLA rocket-propelled grenade (RPG). The APC attempted to reverse to evade further fire but collided with a lorry which was hauling a 37 mm anti-aircraft gun. UNLA troops subsequently set both vehicles ablaze, and Radio Uganda—which had been broadcasting UNLA propaganda throughout the battle—declared that an NRA tank had been destroyed. Soldiers of the 1st Battalion and 3rd Battalion led by Mugisha and Patrick Lumumba employed RPGs to eliminate UNLA anti-armour defences around Radio Uganda. By 15:00, the NRA had secured the Radio Uganda station, killing a UNLA officer and capturing three soldiers. Meanwhile, the 11th Battalion under Chefe Ali captured Nakulabye, Makerere, and Kamwokya. The 11th Battalion only started to encounter substantial resistance in an area between a thicket dubbed "Bat Valley" and Wandegeya, as the local UNLA soldiers held well-concealed positions, set up at 14.5mm gun, and fought with determination. After overcoming this resistance, the rebels fought their way through a series of machine gun positions at a golf course. The 11th Battalion then rushed the UNLA position at Summit View, forcing the troops manning the artillery to surrender and forcing others—including their commanding officer, Lieutenant Colonel Eric Odwar—to retreat. Telecommunications running out of the country were severed. By the afternoon, UNLA troops still held out at the Nile Mansions, and the Parliament building. Around this time, Captain George Nkwanga, the military leader of FEDEMU, was killed in Kampala under disputed circumstances. (Note: According to researcher Caroline Lamwaka, Nkwanga was executed by UNLA troops at the Nile Mansions shortly before their fall to the NRA; the soldiers reportedly believed that FEDEMU -and by extension Nkwanga- had betrayed them to the rebels. Two other tales of his death were provided by the Daily Monitor: Per the one version, Nkwanga was summoned to the Nile Mansions and then beheaded on the orders of Bazilio Olara-Okello. According to the other version, Nkwanga was ambushed by NRA troops during the Battle of Kampala; after being killed in the shootout, the insurgents blamed the incident on a UNLA conspiracy. NRA commander David Tinyefuza argued that Nkwanga was possibly murdered by UFM leader Andrew Kayiira due to long-standing tensions between UFM and FEDEMU.)

While the 7th Battalion continued to battle the Makindye garrison, a UNLA force of about 1,000 men penetrated the NRA's 5th Battalion's roadblock along the Entebbe road, causing Museveni deep consternation. As the 1st Battalion was engaged near the Jinja road and the 11th Battalion was mopping up the UNLA presence on Kololo, he deployed his reserve—two companies of the 3rd Battalion—to stop the advance from Entebbe. Saleh ordered the NRA's 500-strong Special Force under Jet Mwebaze to redeploy from a roadblock on the Jinja road to assist Ivan Koreta's 13th Battalion in the northern section of the city near the Gulu road. After some fighting, the battalion reached and secured Kawempe. With the removal of the roadblock on the Jinja road, UNLA forces began retreating from Kampala, taking their families with them.

Saleh accompanied the 3rd Battalion companies to Namasuba valley where they linked up with a company of the 5th Battalion and took up positions along the Entebbe road. Early in the evening the 7th Battalion captured the Makindye barracks, reportedly aided by the defection of local FEDEMU and UFM troops to the NRA. Museveni subsequently sent the 7th Battalion to the Kisubi roundabout to act as a reserve for the forces guarding the Entebbe route. As dusk fell, the 1,000 UNLA troops entered the Namasuba valley and were ambushed. They retreated, and the NRA forces advanced and occupied Zana hill. Another NRA company stationed at Kisubi began moving towards the UNLA force's rear. Fearing that they were about to be subject to a pincer attack, the UNLA men dispatched an emissary to Zana to offer their surrender. Saleh accepted, and at around 22:00 radioed news of the capitulation to Museveni. By the end of the day the NRA had secured Kampala. Saleh went to Radio Uganda to link up with the 1st Battalion and sleep. Three high-ranking UNLA commanders surrendered when the city fell to the NRA; namely chief of staff Lieutenant General Zeddy Maruru, Brigadier Fred Okecho, and Colonel Samuel Nanyumba. Okello fled via helicopter to Sudan with several members of his staff. (Note: It was rumored during the battle that Okello had initially retreated to Jinja. Okello did temporarily halt at Gulu during this flight to Sudan. He quickly left the town when angry UNLA troops accused him of being a traitor and one colonel even demanded his execution.) FUNA commander Isaac Lumago went into exile in Zaire.

== Aftermath ==
=== Analyses ===
The Battle of Kampala was the largest battle the NRA had partaken in since its inception. Researcher Richard J. Reid described the UNLA's defence of Kampala as "brief but ferocious". Unlike previous, drawn-out engagements in the Ugandan Bush War, the NRA had won the battle through overwhelming force and direct attack. The removal of the NRA roadblock on the route to Jinja allowed many UNLA troops to escape the city and reorganise to launch a new rebellion eight months later. Saleh maintained that he had ordered the roadblock's removal in consideration of "humanitarian reasons", as there could have been "a blood bath and [UNLA troops'] families would perish in the fighting". In contrast, historians Tom Cooper and Adrien Fontanellaz regarded the roadblock's removal as the result of "a faulty order".

=== Course of the war ===
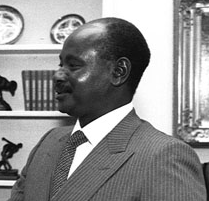
NRA leader Yoweri Museveni (pictured in 1987) was sworn in as President of Uganda following the Battle of Kampala.

Overall, about 20 NRA and 80 UNLA/FUNA soldiers were killed in the fighting, while nearly 3,000 UNLA troops were captured. Most of the UNLA casualties were incurred as troops were shot while attempting to abandon their positions at Radio Uganda and Uganda Television and flee towards Kololo. About 9,000 UNLA soldiers and their families managed to escape from Kampala. Many of these troops retreated towards Jinja and Gulu, looting as they fled. Buildings along Kampala Avenue, the main road in the city, were left heavily damaged by the battle. Unlike previous military takeovers in Kampala, the NRA soldiers did not loot in the city. Following the battle, the NRA's 5th Battalion and one platoon from the 3rd Battalion captured Entebbe. Meanwhile, the FEDEMU and UFM reached an agreement with the NRM/NRA, and joined their forces.

On 29 January Museveni was sworn in as President of Uganda in front of the Parliament building with a crowd of tens of thousands in attendance. In his inaugural address, he promised to support national unity, public security, and democracy, pledging that his government would schedule elections as soon as possible. His appointed cabinet consisted mostly of NRM members and civil servants. Despite Museveni's promises, many northerners in Kampala—viewed as beneficiaries of the Obote and Okello regimes—especially Acholi and Lango people, were subject to abuse and discrimination following the NRA's takeover; some were killed in the streets or forced out of their jobs or homes. Several NRA soldiers stole automobiles from them. Other northerners fled from the repression to their lands of origin. Museveni condemned the violence.

Museveni's government sent an emissary to Sudan to entreat Okello to order the remaining UNLA forces to surrender, but he stated that he no longer controlled them. The NRA subsequently attacked Jinja, capturing it by late January, followed by Tororo in early February. At this point, UNLA attempted one last time to stem the rebel advance by launching a counter-attack against Tororo and fortifying the crossings of the Nile to prevent the NRA from advancing into northern Uganda. Nevertheless, Museveni's forces inflicted further defeats on the UNLA in late February and early March, resulting in the complete collapse of the latter. A presidential election was not held in the country until 1996; Museveni won by a large margin.
