= National Resistance Army =

Military wing of the National Resistance Movement (NRM) of Uganda (1981–1995)

- Leader: Yoweri Museveni
- Dates active: June 1981 – 1995
- Ideology: Maoism

The National Resistance Army (NRA) was a guerilla army and the military wing of the National Resistance Movement (NRM) that fought in the Ugandan Bush War against the government of Milton Obote, and later the government of Tito Okello. NRA was supported by Muammar Gaddafi.

NRA was formed in 1981 when Yoweri Museveni's Popular Resistance Army (PRA) merged with ex-president Yusuf Lule's group, the Uganda Freedom Fighters (UFF). Museveni, then leader of the Uganda Patriotic Movement party, alleged electoral fraud and declared an armed rebellion, following the victory of Uganda Peoples Congress in the bitterly disputed 1980 general election.

Museveni, who had guerrilla war experience with the Mozambican Liberation Front (FRELIMO) in Mozambique, and his own Front for National Salvation (FRONASA) formed in Tanzania to fight Idi Amin, led the NRA to victory against Ugandan government troops (UNLA) in 1986. By the time the victorious NRA entered Kampala in 1986, about a quarter of its 16,000 combatants were Banyarwanda, while Fred Rwigema was its deputy commander. The NRA then became the national army.

Shortly afterwards, the UNLA carried out a number of attacks against civilians in the north of Uganda. The attacks largely targeted the Acholi people and were in part seen as a form of revenge for Operation Bonanza, the scorched-earth operation there that had been ordered by Milton Obote during his presidency.

From 1986 to 1990, the Museveni regime tried to end various insurgencies and establish control over the army. Despite repeated government claims that the NRA had defeated the UNLA and other rebel groups, insurgent activity continued, especially in the northern, eastern, and western regions. In April 1988, 3,000 former Uganda People's Army (UPA) fighters and members of several other small rebel groups accepted a government amnesty by surrendering and declaring their support for Museveni's regime. In June 1988, the president concluded a peace agreement with Uganda People's Democratic Army (UPDA) commander Lieutenant Colonel John Angelo Okello. Although the NRA subsequently integrated many UPA and UPDA personnel into its ranks, thousands of others rejected the peace accord and continued to fight against the NRA.

After the 1995 Ugandan constitution was enacted, the NRA was renamed the Uganda People's Defence Force.
