= Sam Magara =

Ugandan military officer

- Born: Sam Emmanuel Magara
- Died: 2 August 1982; Naakulabye, Kampala, Uganda
- Burial place: Rutooma, Kajara, Uganda
- Military career
- Allegiance: Front for National Salvation (FRONASA); Save Uganda Movement (SUM); Popular Resistance Army (PRA); National Resistance Army (NRA)
- Service years: ?–1982
- Rank: Lieutenant Colonel
- Conflicts: Resistance against Idi Amin; Ugandan Bush War; Battle of Kabamba; Battle of Kakiri

Sam Magara (died 2 August 1982) was a Ugandan rebel, and one of the National Resistance Army (NRA)'s leading commanders during the early phases of the Ugandan Bush War. A long-time associate of NRA leader Yoweri Museveni, he became the latter's second-in-command in 1981 and assumed command of the NRA in his absence. However, he fell into disfavor after the NRA's internal security network alleged that he was planning to overthrow Museveni. Magara was eventually killed by security forces in Kampala in late 1982.

== Biography ==
=== Early life and exile ===
Sam Emmanuel Magara was an ethnic Muhima, and part of the Bahinda clan. He was born to Mutembeya, a sub-county chief in Ankole. Sam Magara joined Yoweri Museveni's Front for National Salvation (FRONASA) at an early point. FRONASA worked to overthrow the regime of Idi Amin, dictator of Uganda from 1971 to 1979. In 1973, Magara's brother Martin Mwesiga was killed during a shootout between FRONASA militants and Amin's security forces. Afterwards, Magara and his family fled into exile.

Exiled to Tanzania, he began studying at the University of Dar es Salaam for a master's degree. There, he met his future wife, Joy. The two relocated to Kenya, where they married in Nairobi in 1977. Magara was also a lawyer, and served in the Save Uganda Movement for some time. Amin was overthrown during the Uganda–Tanzania War of 1978–1979. Magara began training at the Tanzania Military Academy at Monduli. He returned to Uganda in late 1980, where a new political crisis had developed. Ex-President Milton Obote had won the December 1980 election, a result which was heavily contested by the Ugandan opposition including Museveni. Several rebel groups emerged to battle Obote's regime and its military, the Uganda National Liberation Army (UNLA), in the Ugandan Bush War.

=== Ugandan Bush War ===
==== Popular Resistance Army insurgency ====
Important locations of Magara's military career.

In December 1980, Museveni called for his closest supporters and allies to meet in Makindye; Magara was among the attendants. The group discussed plans to launch an insurgency. Museveni tasked Magara to link up with supporters of the "Gang of Four", a Communist opposition faction. Together, they visited the bases of the UNLF-AD, the Gang of Four's armed wing, in the Rwenzori Mountains. Meanwhile, the political rivalry between Museveni and Obote escalated in violence, as supporters of both carried out assassinations against each other. Magara and ex-FRONASA cadres under his leadership murdered several ex-Kikosi Maalum fighters who were loyal to Obote.

In early 1981, Magara was part of the small group that formed Museveni's Popular Resistance Army (PRA), a rebel force which was supposed to overthrow Obote's government. At the time, Magara was a 2nd lieutenant and one of the few professionally trained soldiers in Museveni's group. As a result of this background and due to him being a "close comrade" of Museveni, he became the PRA leader's second-in-command.

Alongside Museveni and Elly Tumwine, Magara planned the PRA's first operation which culminated in the Battle of Kabamba in February 1981. He served as one of the rebel commanders during this clash. His unit was supposed to capture the armoury of the Kabamba Military Barracks, but was unable to do so. In March, he was appointed commander of the PRA's 2nd Section, operating along the Kampala–Bombo Road. Museveni often left Magara in command of the entire PRA when leaving the field. In April, he co-commanded a rebel raid on Kakiri.

==== National Resistance Army commander ====
In June 1981, a new rebel coalition was organised, with the PRA and the Uganda Freedom Fighters agreeing to unite as the National Resistance Movement (NRM), with the National Resistance Army (NRA) as armed wing. Museveni became Chairman of the High Command of the NRA, while Magara was appointed the NRA's deputy commander after his predecessor, Ahmed Seguya, died of sickness. Magara was designated RO/0005 within the NRA.

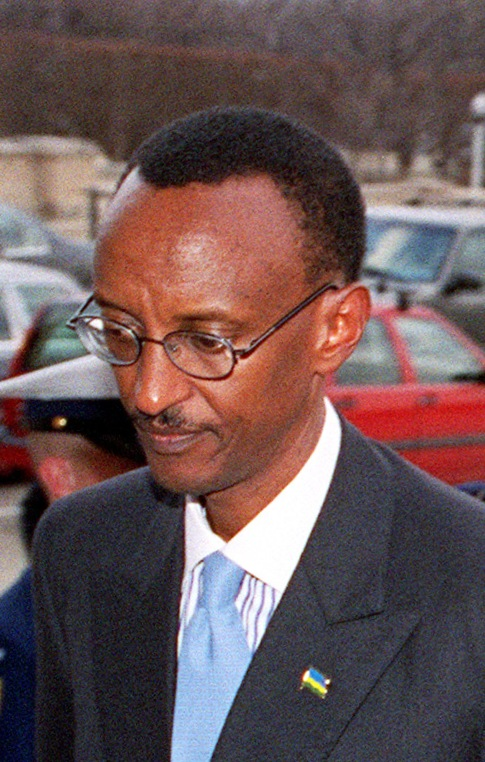
Paul Kagame (pictured 2003) suspected Magara of conspiring against Yoweri Museveni.

Museveni consequently ventured abroad, leaving Magara in command of the NRA from June to December 1981. In course of this period, however, the NRA began to experience substantial internal tensions due to ethnic and social differences between the rebel fighters, as the group expanded from just about 200 to over 900 fighters. Despite being described as a charismatic leader, Magara was also harsh and worsened the strains within the movement. He executed one of his officers, Shaban Kashanku, after a short trial. Kashanku had temporarily left a NRA camp without permission, and Magara had accused him of being a double agent. Other NRA militants objected to Kashanku's killing, claiming that he had only visited a nearby town. The execution further damaged the already tense relationships within the NRA, with many common fighters fearing that they too might be summarly killed. In addition, Magara formed a clique with fellow NRA officers Jack Muchunguzi, Hannington Mugabi and Joram Mugume. The NRM's internal security network led by Paul Kagame began to suspect that Magara and his allies were conspiring against Museveni. Kagame's network believed that the clique planned to take power from Museveni in a coup or split off to form a separate rebel force in Rwenzori Mountains. Magara's circle was suspected of working with the Gang of Four in this regard. Kagame reportedly stopped the plot in its tracks. Museveni rushed back to retake command after being informed of the situation and held several meetings with his troops to restore order. He was able to defuse the internal tensions by introducing a detailed code of conduct for the NRA. Magara was subsequently sidelined within the NRA.

In August 1982, Magara and other NRA members secretly entered the Ugandan capital Kampala, where he intended to visit a dentist due to a tooth problem. However, their cover was blown and their hideout encircled by UNLA soldiers. While several NRA fighters were able to escape, Magara attempted to retrieve crucial documents before leaving, and was shot dead by the security forces at the house of Ambassador Katenta Apuuli in Naakulabye on 2 August. His death was regarded as a heavy blow to the NRA, and was reportedly celebrated by Obote's government. The government paraded his corpse, alongside those of other suspected NRA supporters, through Bugolobi. Rumours quickly emerged within the NRA which alleged that Magara had been killed as a result of the continuing tensions within the NRA; the NRA command gave orders that nobody should discuss his demise. NRA veteran John Kazoora claimed that it "was clear that [Magara] was betrayed and a victim of intrigue". Ultimately, two of Magara's alleged co-conspirators, Mugabi and Muchunguzi, were killed under disputed circumstances; Muchunguzi was allegedly executed by Kagame.

Magara's family was only informed of his demise six months later, and his sister was able to arrange for a proper burial at Lugogo. He and his brother Martin Mwesiga were exhumed and reburied at Rutooma, Kajara, in 2005.

== Personal life ==
Sam and Joy Magara had four children: Stalin Kanduho (born c. 1975), Patricia Magara (born 1978), Sam Mwerindebiro (born c. 1980), and Emmanuel Noowe. Stalin Kanduho later became an officer in the Uganda People's Defence Force, the NRA's successor organization, while Patricia Magara became a lawyer. As a result of Magara's activities as a rebel, the family spent the 1970s and early 1980s mostly in exile in Kenya, eventually returning to Uganda in 1984.
