= Joseph Musoke Ssemwanga =

Ugandan general (born 1973)

Major General Joseph Musoke Ssemwanga
- Born: 1973 (age 52–53); Uganda
- Citizenship: Uganda
- Education: Tanzania Military Academy (Officer Cadet Course) (Senior Command & Staff College Course)
- Occupation: Military Officer
- Years active: 1995–present
- Title: Deputy Commander of the UPDF Land Forces

Major General Joseph Musoke Ssemwanga (also Joseph Semwanga), is a Ugandan military officer and commander. He serves as the Deputy Commander of the UPDF Land Forces, since December 2025. Previously, he commanded the UPDF contingent under the African Union Stabilization Mission in Somalia (AUSSOM), from 2024 until 2025. Before he was deployed to Somalia, he served the commander of the UPDF First Division, based at Kakiri in Wakiso District. During the 2010s, he commanded the UPDF Armored Brigade.

== Background and training ==
Joseph Musoke Ssemwanga was born in 1973 in Mukono District. He joined the army in 1995 and was commissioned on 4 July 1997 after completing the Officer Cadet Course at Monduli Military Academy, Tanzania. He has attended a number of military courses, including the following:

- An Instructors' Course
- A Course in Special Forces Light Infantry
- A Tank Crew Course
- A Tank Platoon Command Course
- A Tank Technology Course in India
- A Tank Company Command Course
- A Tank Battalion Command Course
- A Senior Command and Staff College Course, in Tanzania, in 2008.

== Military career ==
Joseph Semwanga has held a number of appointments in the UPDF, including the following:

- Administrative Officer, Kalama Armoured Warfare Training School, Kabamba, Mubende District
- Chief Instructor Kalama Armoured Warfare Training School, Kabamba, Mubende District
- Commandant Kalama Armoured Warfare Training School, Kabamba, Mubende District
- Brigade Operations and Training Officer, Armoured Brigade, Masaka, Masaka District
- Commandant Armoured Brigade, Masaka, Masaka District. He was appointed to that position in May 2013, replacing Major General David Muhoozi, who became the Commander of Land Forces within the Uganda People's Defence Forces.
- Commander of the UPDF First Infantry Division, based in Kakiri, Wakiso District.
- Commander of the UPDF contingent under the African Union Stabilization Mission in Somalia (AUSSOM), from 2024 until 2025.
- In Dember 2025, General Francis Takirwa, previously Deputy Commander of the UPDF Land Forces fell ill and was hospitalised. General Muhoozi Kainerugaba, the UPDF Chief of Defefence Forces (CDF), appointed Joseph Musoke Ssemwanga to replace Takirwa as deputy commander of Uganda's land forces. The CDF simultaneously promoted him from the rank of Brigadier to that of Major General. This appointment was announced in February 2026 but was made retroactive to December 2025.

== See also ==
- Katumba Wamala
- David Muhoozi
- Uganda People's Defence Force
