= Battle of Kakiri =

1981 battle of the Ugandan Bush War

Battle of Kabamba
- Part of the Ugandan Bush War
- Battle of Kakiri (Uganda)
Date	5 April 1981
Location	Kakiri, Uganda
Result	Popular Resistance Army (PRA) victory

Belligerents
Uganda; Tanzania	Popular Resistance Army (PRA)

Commanders and leaders
Unidentified TPDF major †	Yoweri Museveni; Sam Magara; Jack Muchunguzi; Hannington Mugabi; Fred Rwigyema

Units involved
UNLA garrison of Kakiri; TPDF	PRA's 1st, 2nd, 3rd, 4th, and 5th Sections

Strength
Unknown	c. 60

Casualties and losses
Several killed	None

The Battle of Kakiri (5 April 1981) was a raid by Popular Resistance Army (PRA) rebels to capture weapons and ammunition at a military outpost in Kakiri during the early Ugandan Bush War. Kakiri was defended by a Uganda National Liberation Army (UNLA) contingent. The insurgents successfully overran the outpost and then tried to retreat with their loot. In the process, they chanced upon a Tanzania People's Defence Force (TPDF) patrol, killing several of its members. The PRA subsequently escaped into the bush, pursued by UNLA and TPDF troops. A few days later, one PRA contingent was attacked by a TPDF company and lost some of the weapons captured at Kakiri.

== Background ==
In April 1979 Tanzanian forces and the Uganda National Liberation Army (UNLA), a coalition of armed rebel groups united under the Uganda National Liberation Front (UNLF), invaded Uganda and deposed the President, Idi Amin. A new UNLF government was installed, but it was weak and exercised little control over the country. This was in part due to the UNLF's and its army's own internal divisions. One of the most important rivalries emerged between the supporters of Milton Obote and Yoweri Museveni. Over time power shifted to pro-Obote elements in the government and the army. As a result of the political infighting and the power of the armed factions, Uganda's first post-Amin provisional government led by President Yusuf Lule was unstable. Lule was dismissed on 20 June 1979, and replaced by Godfrey Binaisa who lacked his own power base. In May 1980, Binaisa was also deposed and Uganda fell under the control of the UNLF's Military Commission that was supposed to rule until the scheduled December 1980 general election. These elections were won by Obote and his supporters, but the results were disputed by other political factions. Regardless, Obote assumed power, and ruled through repressive methods, including the incarceration and killing of dissidents. Museveni subsequently organized the Popular Resistance Army" (PRA) rebel group and began attacking UNLA forces in February 1981, entering the Ugandan Bush War.

The PRA mainly operated in the Luwero Triangle west of Uganda's capital Kampala. Knowing that his force was small and not well equipped, Museveni envisioned that his rebels would wage a long-term "people's war" to gradually undermine Obote's government and build up support across Uganda, starting with the Luwero region where many civilians were already sympathetic to his cause.

== Prelude ==
One of the first priorities for the PRA was the capture of weaponry for its fighters. However, early rebel attempts to capture guns from the UNLa and its TPDF allies were rather unsuccessful: The Battle of Kabamba on 6 February 1981 was a partial failure, and a subsequent series of raids on police stations yielded only few weapons. On 9 February, a UNLA-TPDF force attacked the PRA near Kiboga, forcing it to scatter and causing a dozen rebels to quit the insurgency. Afterward, the remaining PRA fighters reunited, and spent several weeks in hiding, gathering food and reorganizing. The rebels formed five sections, led respectively by Museveni, Sam Magara, Jack Muchunguzi, Hannington Mugabi, and Fred Rwigyema. After a promised arms shipment by the PRA's foreign allies failed to arrive, the group resumed its attacks on government targets on 18 March.

In April, the PRA opted to launch a "more ambitious" raid, targeting a UNLA outpost at Kakiri to capture more weapons and demonstrate its ability to inflict damage against the government. Kakiri was located along the Kampala–Hoima Road, about 17 miles (27 km) from the Ugandan capital. The local outpost was a makeshift military camp, hosting about two companies of UNLA soldiers. One PRA spy working at the local sub-county headquarters was ordered to scout the UNLA outpost, allowing the rebels to ascertain that the government troops had set up few proper defenses and not dug any trenches.

== Battle ==
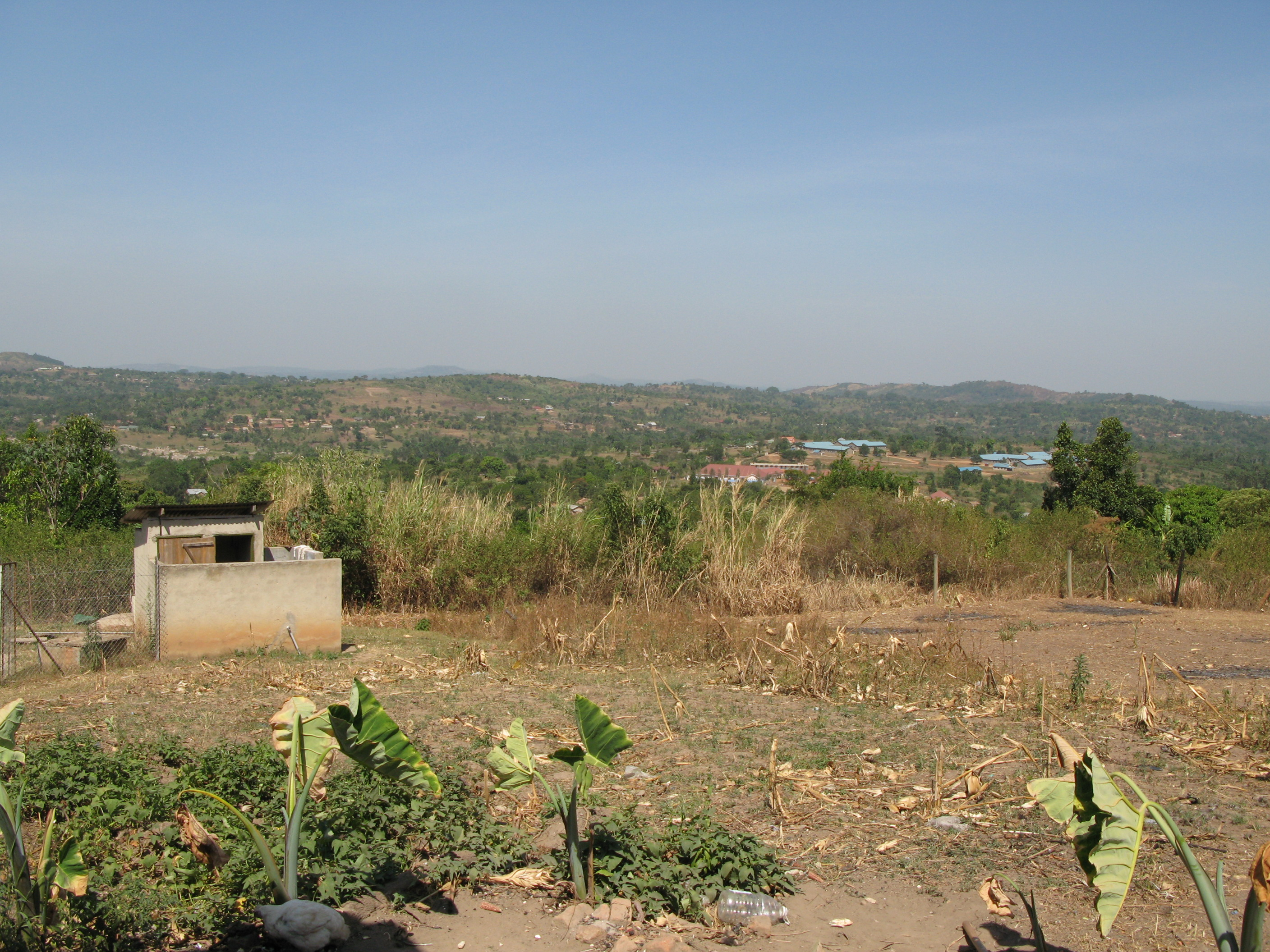
Overview of the landscape around Kakiri (photo, 2012)

On late 4 April, about 60 PRA insurgents left their hideout at Kikandwa and marched through the night to stealthily approach Kakiri. The rebels avoided roads, instead moving through forests and plantations. When they arrived near Kakiri on early 5 April, (Note: Though most sources state that the Battle of Kakiri took place on 5 April, some have also provided 6 April as date.) the PRA leadership initially wanted to allow its troops some rest and to attack in the evening. However, the fighters encountered a civilian on a bicycle who sped away, and also discovered that their planned hiding place was located near a well; this made a discovery by the local garrison likely. After a short discussion, Museveni and the other PRA commanders decided to immediately attack in order to maintain the element of surprise. The assault was initiated by a PRA fighter shooting a rocket-propelled grenade at the local police station, whereupon the five rebel sections stormed the camp. The rebels swiftly overran the outpost; the confused UNLA soldiers offered little resistance. At this stage, neither side lost any troops. As the UNLA soldiers fled, PRA member Pecos Kutesa reportedly crawled forward under gunfire to personally capture a heavy machine gun which had been placed in front of the military camp. Furthermore, Museveni's followers captured two 60mm mortars, twelve submachine guns, and ammunition. With this loot, the rebels tried to retreat, while UNLA troops counter-attacked.

As the fighting withdrawal of the insurgents was in process, a truck with TPDF soldiers led by a major arrived at the site from Busunju. Knowing the poor gun discipline of the local UNLA soldiers, the Tanzanians were unaware that the shooting was related to an actual rebel attack. Accordingly, the TPDF major jumped from his vehicle and demanded that the UNLA troops stop firing, calling them to order. Instead, Rwigyema used the opportunity to take aim and kill the Tanzania officer. Several other TPDF soldiers were also killed as the other PRA militants opened fire on the truck. The PRA then retreated into the nearby forest in good order.

A UNLA-TPDF force, including at least one armoured personnel carrier and several mortar crews, chased after the rebels. The pro-government troops shot aimlessly into the forest, but hit no rebels, and were successfully evaded.

== Aftermath ==
As a lesson of the raid, the PRA leadership concluded that they had to always take a group of porters on important missions, as the militants had difficulties transporting their loot during the retreat from Kakiri. In public, the PRA proclaimed that it had killed 200 UNLA and 100 TPDF soldiers at Kakiri.

After the battle at Kakiri, the PRA split into two columns, one led by Magara and one by Elly Tumwine. The latter contingent was detected by the TPDF and attacked on 18 April, resulting in a clash that ended in the rebels losing several fighters and some of the weaponry captured at Kakiri. The rebel contingents subsequently reunited and focused on recruiting new members; the PRA expanded to about 200 fighters by late April. In June, the PRA merged with another rebel group, the Uganda Freedom Fighters, forming the National Resistance Movement (NRM). Museveni was made vice-chairman of the National Resistance Council, the group's political body, and Chairman of the High Command of the National Resistance Army (NRA), the Movement's armed organ.

Over the next years, fighting between the NRA and UNLA ebbed and flowed, as the government would launch major counterinsurgency operations in the Luwero Triangle, disrupting NRA activities, only for the rebels to retake lost territory upon the end of the offensives. Meanwhile, Kakiri remained under UNLA control; local soldiers committed two massacres at the town in mid-1982. A NRA contingent under Salim Saleh raided Kakiri in late 1982. After defeating the UNLA and its allies in a series of major battles, the NRA conquered Kampala in January 1986. Museveni was declared the country's new president and the NRA became the new national army.
