= Nonve Central Forest Reserve =

Forest reserve in Uganda

- Nonve forest
- IUCN category III (natural monument or feature)
- Location: Wakiso district, Central Region, Uganda
- Nearest city: Wakiso district
- Area: 738 ha (1,820 acres)
- Governing body: National Forestry Authority

Nonve Central Forest Reserve is a 738 hectare forest reserve located in Kakiri Town Council, Wakiso District, Uganda. It is part of the Central Forest Reserves of Uganda, which are managed by the National Forestry Authority (NFA).

== Setting ==
Nonve Central Forest Reserve was established in 1933 in Wakiso district. The NFA initiated a tree-planting program in 2018 to help restore the forest reserve. The Nonve Central Forest Reserve is vital to Uganda's environment and economy, as it serves as an important source of water, wildlife, and recreation. The NFA is striving to restore and safeguard the forest reserve from further degradation.

== Degradation and Restoration ==
In recent years, the Nonve Central Forest Reserve has been degraded by human activity, including logging, agricultural encroachment, and charcoal burning. More than 60% of the 738 hectares comprising the Nonve forest reserve in Kakiri, Wakiso district, have been grabbed. In 2018, the NFA launched a tree-planting campaign to restore the Nonve Central Forest Reserve. The campaign aims to plant 1 million trees in the forest reserve over a period of five years. The NFA is also working to raise awareness of the importance of the forest reserve and to prevent further degradation. The forest reserve was destroyed, according to NFA, by people who partially built houses, planted eucalyptus, and gained land titles on it. The Ministry of Lands issued a warning to individuals and businesses claiming ownership of forest land in 2021.

The Kakiri town council chairperson proposed a 5-year program to repair degraded natural reserves, including Nonve Forest Reserve, as well as rally locals to maintain forest reserves and plant trees. He stated that some of the trees would be planted on the 10-acre plot of property purchased by the town council and designated as a dumping site. Fruit trees would be provided to households to plant during the campaign. The Kakiri town council will also organize competitions among communities to recognize the best in tree planting and protection. Forest destruction is related to a lack of awareness about the advantages of trees.

Forest reserves are also destroyed to make way for the planting of fast-growing tree species, as they more readily supply firewood and timber. Natural forest devastation has resulted in the extinction of indigenous plants used for herbal medicine as well as habitat for wild animals that cannot be regained. Nonve Central Forest Reserve is vital to Uganda's environment and economy. It serves as an important source of water, wildlife, and recreation. Former Vice President Prof Gilbert Bukenya blamed Wakiso District in 2015 for the destruction of the 738-hectare Nonve Central Forest Reserve. He stated that the forest reserve is rich in medicinal trees and urged immediate restoration of the forest as well as the removal of cows, which he claimed were harming tree stumps and water sources for locals.

The former vice president advised the Wakiso area to take part in tree replanting, while the National Forestry Authority (NFA) should be in charge of delivering seedlings.

The NFA is striving to restore and safeguard the forest reserve from further degradation. According to the NFA, a single real estate broker surveyed and mapped 75 properties in the Nonve Central Forest Reserve in Kakiri, Wakiso district. According to NFA, as part of its responsibility to safeguard and sustainably manage Central Forest Reserves throughout the country, they discovered that certificates of ownership were issued erroneously and illegally on land that is part and parcel of several Central Forest Reserves in Uganda. Over 100 land titles in the Nonve forest reserve in Kakiri, Wakiso district, were annulled on June 21, 2017.

== See also ==
List of Central Forest Reserves of Uganda
