= Ugandan Bush War =

1980–1986 guerrilla war in Uganda

- Part of the Cold War
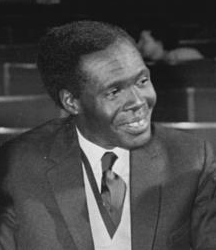
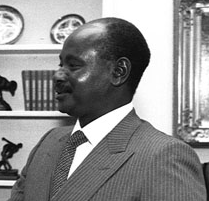
- Milton Obote (left) and Yoweri Museveni (right), leaders of the UNLF government forces and National Resistance Army respectively for most of the war.
Date	6 October 1980 – March 1986
Location	Uganda
Result	NRM victory, civil war de facto continues

Belligerents
(Uganda) Ugandan government; UNLF/UPC; FEDEMU (from 1985); FUNA (from 1985); UNRF (I) (from 1985); UFM (from 1985); Tanzania (until 1985); North Korea (1981–1985); Zaire (1986, alleged)	(Uganda) National Resistance Movement (NRM); PRA; UFF; West Nile rebels: Uganda Army (1980); UNRF (I) (1980–1985); FUNA (1980–1985); Nile Regiment; (Uganda) UFM (1980–1983); (Uganda) FEDEMU (1983–1985); (Uganda) ULM; (Uganda) UNLF-AD; Rwenzururu movement (until 1982); Karamojong groups

Commanders and leaders
Milton Obote; Tito Okello; David Oyite-Ojok †; Smith Opon Acak; Bazilio Olara-Okello; John Charles Ogole	National Resistance Army: Yoweri Museveni; Salim Saleh; Stephen Katenta-Apuli; Sam Magara †; Steven Kashaka; Joram Mugume; Pecos Kuteesa; Fred Rwigyema; Yusuf Lule; West Nile rebels: Moses Ali; Amin Onzi; Felix Onama; Isaac Lumago; Elly Hassan; UFM and FEDEMU: Balaki Kirya; Andrew Kayiira (POW); David Lwanga

Units involved
Ugandan military; Uganda National Liberation Army (UNLA); Conciliated rebel groups; Pro-government militias; People's Militia; National Youth Army; Tribal militias; UPC youth paramilitaries; Korean People's Army	Numerous rebel militias

Strength
UNLA and allied militias: 15,000+ (1981); 35,000–40,000 (1984) c. 15,000 (late 1985); Tanzania: 11,000 (until 1980); 800–1,000 (from 1981) c. 50 (1984); North Korea: 30+ (1981) c. 50 (1984); 170–700 (1985)	Uganda Army: c. 7,100 (1980); NRA: 900 (Dec. 1981); 4,000 (early 1983); c. 10,000 (late 1985)

Casualties and losses
- 100,000–500,000 killed

The Ugandan Bush War was a civil war fought in Uganda by the official Ugandan government and its armed wing, the Uganda National Liberation Army (UNLA), against a number of rebel groups, most importantly the National Resistance Army (NRA), from 1980 to 1986.

The unpopular President Milton Obote was overthrown in a coup d'état in 1971 by General Idi Amin, who established a military dictatorship. Amin was overthrown in 1979 following the Uganda-Tanzania War, but his loyalists started the Bush War by launching an insurgency in the West Nile region in 1980. Subsequent elections saw Obote return to power in a UNLA-ruled government. Several opposition groups claimed the elections were rigged, and united as the NRA under the leadership of Yoweri Museveni to start an armed uprising against Obote's government on 6 February 1981. Obote was overthrown and replaced as president by his general Tito Okello in 1985 during the closing months of the conflict. Okello formed a coalition government consisting of his followers and several armed opposition groups, which agreed to a peace deal. In contrast, the NRA refused to compromise with the government, and conquered much of western and southern Uganda in a number of offensives from August to December 1985.

The NRA captured Kampala, Uganda's capital, in January 1986. It subsequently established a new government with Museveni as president, while the UNLA fully disintegrated in March 1986. Obote and Okello went into exile. Despite the nominal end of the civil war, numerous anti-NRA rebel factions and militias remained active, and would continue to fight Museveni's government in the next decades.

== Names ==
The Ugandan Bush War is also known by a variety of other names. For instance, Ugandan Civil War has also been used, though this title has also been employed for other military conflicts such as the Lord's Resistance Army insurgency. As a result of the eventual victory of the NRM, several alternate titles for the 1980–1986 conflict reference the rebel group and its main theater of operations, the Luwero Triangle: These include Luwero War, National Resistance Movement revolution, or Resistance War.

== Background ==
In 1971, the President of Uganda Milton Obote was overthrown in a coup d'état by parts of the Uganda Army which put Idi Amin in power. Obote had been president since Uganda's independence from the United Kingdom in 1962, and his regime saw a general decline in living standards in the country, with growing corruption, factional violence, and persecution of ethnic groups. Obote's increasing unpopularity led him to believe rivals were beginning to plot against him, particularly Amin and arranged a purge to occur while he was outside of the country. As Amin was popular in sections of the military, his loyalists responded by acting first and overthrowing the government, forcing Obote into exile in Tanzania. Despite initial popularity, Amin quickly turned to despotism and established a military dictatorship which accelerated the decline of Obote's regime, destroying the country's economy and political system.

As time went on, Amin's regime was increasingly destabilized by factionalism and economic decline, while opposition groups as well as dissatisfied elements of the Uganda Army repeatedly attempted to organize uprisings or to overthrow his regime by other means. Several opposition factions, including Obote's loyalists, were supported by Tanzania under President Julius Nyerere. In 1978, parts of the Uganda Army launched an invasion of Tanzania under unclear circumstances, resulting in open war with the neighboring country. Tanzania halted the assault, mobilised anti-Amin opposition groups, and launched a counter-offensive. Amin's forces and his Libyan allies were defeated by Tanzanian troops and the Uganda National Liberation Front (UNLF), a political coalition formed by exiled anti-Amin Ugandans under the leadership of Obote, whose armed wing was known as Uganda National Liberation Army (UNLA). Amin was overthrown during the fall of Kampala and then fled the country, and UNLF was installed by Tanzania to replace him. The unstable UNLF government ruled the country provisionally from April 1979 until December 1980. Meanwhile, the ousted Amin loyalists who had fled into Zaire and Sudan reorganised, and prepared to renew war in order to regain control of Uganda. Obote planned to regain power, even though he remained widely unpopular in Uganda. War correspondent Al J Venter stated that in case of Obote's return to the presidency "Uganda will be assured of another war, many times as intense as the current struggle [i.e. the Uganda–Tanzania War]. Only, the next one will be a guerrilla conflict".

Meanwhile, Uganda's northeast was destabilized by large-scale banditry and communal violence. Karamojong groups, Uganda Army remnants, and foreign raiders (Note: One eyewitness stated that "Malire from Ethiopia, Terposa from Sudan, Turcanas from Kenya, Somali bandits" took part in the 1980 raiding.) used the political instability to raid cattle and other foodstock. These events caused a famine in Karamojong Province which killed 50,000 out of the 360,000 inhabintants of the northeastern highlands.

== Bush War ==
=== West Nile rebellion ===
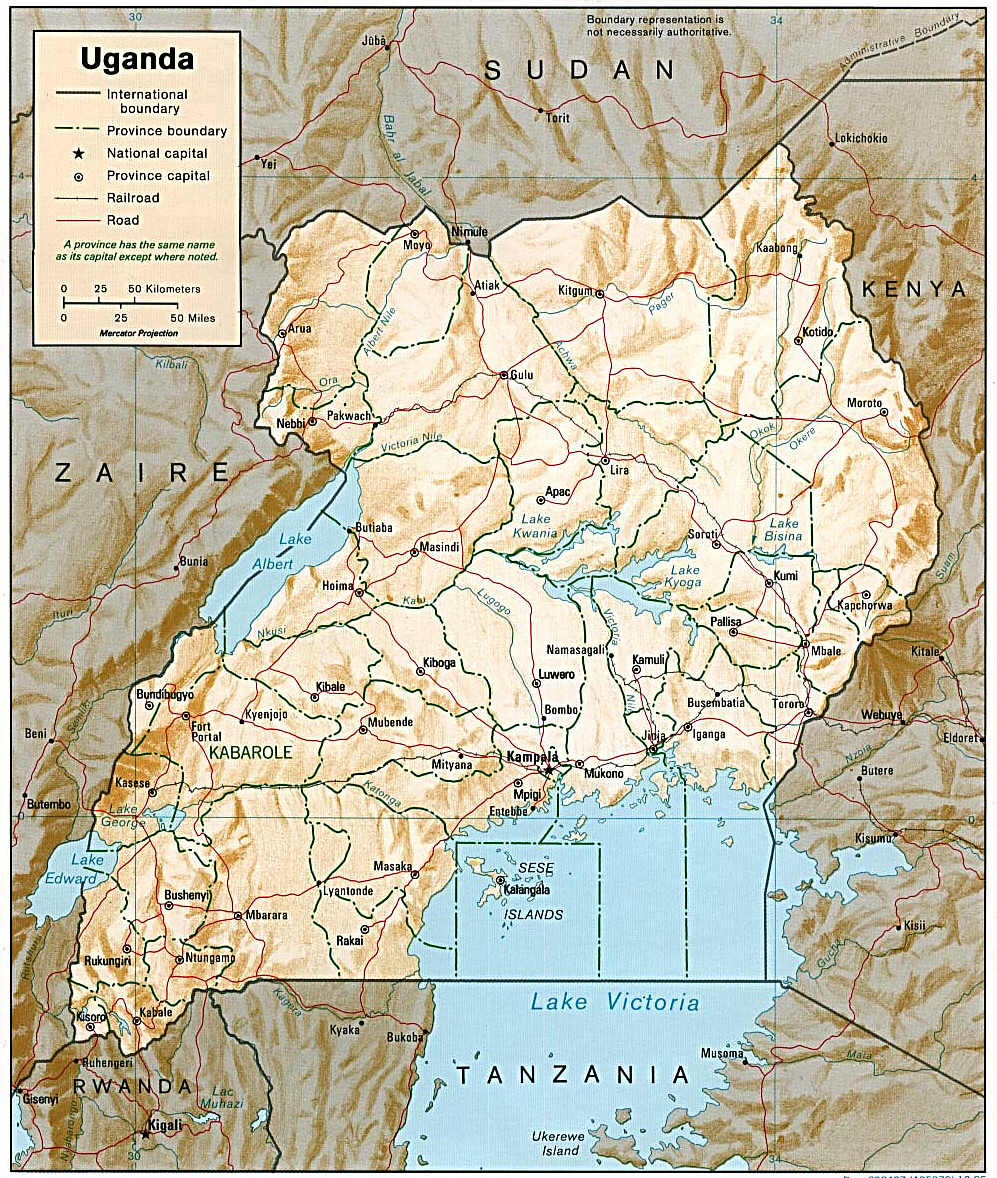
The first rebellion broke out in the West Nile region of Uganda's northwest. The epicenter of the war later shifted to the Luwero Triangle north of Kampala.

The first group to initiate hostilities were the Amin loyalists who launched a rebellion against the UNLF government in the autumn of 1980. Their 7,100-strong force never adopted an official name, but is generally called "Uganda Army" as it consisted for the most part of old troops of Amin's Uganda Army (it was also known as "West Front" or "Western Nile Front"). The rebels were not truly unified but split into several bands (Note: It remains unclear to what extent the pro-Amin forces were unified during the Bush War. In August 1985, Isaac Lumago claimed that the "structure of the army that went into exile after Amin's overthrow remains intact in southern Sudan and eastern Zaire".) that were loyal to numerous officers who had previously served under Amin such as Emilio Mondo, Isaac Lumago, Isaac Maliyamungu, Elly Hassan, Christopher Mawadri, and Moses Ali. Amin arranged for the group to receive money from Saudi Arabia in preparation for a large-scale attack across the border against the West Nile sub-region. On 6 October, one week before the offensive was to commence, about 500 rebels crossed the border and attacked the town of Koboko. The 200-strong UNLA garrison was on parade at the time and was unarmed; the rebels massacred the soldiers. Word of the attack spread to other UNLA garrisons in West Nile, who quickly fled to the Nile River, leaving the Uganda Army's advance unopposed. They were welcomed by the local population, which had tense relations with the UNLA. As the rebels knew that they could not hold the captured territory against a full UNLA counter-offensive, they mostly retreated back into Sudan after a few days with a large amount of loot. The UNLA began its counterattack on 12 October accompanied by Tanzanian forces. The only significant resistance they encountered was in Bondo, where six Tanzanians were killed. The UNLA forces, considering the local population hostile, engaged in a campaign of destruction and looting across the West Nile, as Tanzanian officers tried in vain to restrain them. They leveled the town of Arua, killed over 1,000 civilians, and provoked the flight of over 250,000 refugees to Sudan and Zaire. The brutality of the UNLA inspired further unrest, as peasants and ex-soldiers took up arms to defend their lands from the government forces.

The Uganda Army launched its next offensive just before the Ugandan national elections in December 1980. In one of their most daring actions, the rebels ambushed Obote as he was touring the West Nile region. They almost killed him and Tito Okello, a high-ranking UNLA commander. This time, the Uganda Army also held the areas it captured in West Nile, and set up a parallel government after retaking Koboko. After about one month of combat, the insurgents had captured most of West Nile, leaving only some towns under UNLA control. However, many rebels focused more on looting the area and taking the plunder back to Zaire and Sudan than on fighting the UNLA.

The West Nile rebellion was weakened by internal divisions as parts of the Uganda Army remained loyal to Idi Amin, whereas others wanted to distance themselves from the unpopular old dictator. (Note: In fact, several supposed Amin loyalists had found themselves in opposition to the former president in the past. For example, Christopher Mawadri claimed that he rebelled and fought against Amin's forces during the Uganda–Tanzania War.) The latter part of the insurgent army split off, forming the "Uganda National Rescue Front" (UNRF) under Moses Ali, whereas the remaining Amin loyalists were still called the "Ugandan Army" until becoming known as "Former Uganda National Army" (FUNA). The West Nile rebels soon started to fight each other.

Furthermore, southwestern Uganda experienced a resurgence of the Rwenzururu movement which wanted self-determination for the Konjo and Amba peoples. The movement had been largely dormant since the 1960s, but managed to take control of weapon stockpiles that had been left unguarded when Amin's government collapsed in 1979. They thus resumed their insurgency, and the security situation in the mountainous border areas of the southwest quickly deteriorated in 1980.

Meanwhile, the UNLF government experienced its own divisions. As the UNLA was being transformed from a loose alliance of various anti-Amin insurgent groups into a regular army, the different political factions attempted to ensure that their own loyalists would be present and dominant in the new military. Obote outmaneuvered his rivals, most importantly Yoweri Museveni, and made his 5,000-strong Kikosi Maalum group the core of the UNLA. In contrast, just 4,000 out of Museveni's 9,000 FRONASA fighters were allowed to join the new army, and these were distributed across several units. Furthermore, FRONASA was forced to give up its own weaponry. At the same time, the UNLA was rapidly expanded; most of the new recruits came from ethnic groups that supported Obote. As result, power shifted to pro-Obote elements in the government and the army.

=== 1980 elections and outbreak of the southern rebellions ===
The elections of December 1980 were officially won by Milton Obote's Uganda People's Congress, effectively making him president of Uganda again. (Note: The UPC took advantage of the chaos in West Nile in October to declare that its parliamentary candidates won the local constituencies unopposed.) However, the results were strongly disputed by other candidates, resulting in increasing strife. Several political factions claimed electoral fraud, and believed themselves to be proven correct when Obote immediately launched a campaign of political repression. As the UNLA was dominated by pro-Obote forces, a coup was impossible, so the opposition instead launched armed rebellions against Obote's government: Museveni's followers created the Popular Resistance Army (PRA), Yusuf Lule formed the Uganda Freedom Fighters (UFF), Andrew Kayiira armed his Uganda Freedom Movement (UFM), and the Communist "Gang of Four" organized an armed group known as the Uganda National Liberation Front – Anti-Dictatorship (UNLF-AD). The latter group was temporarily supported by Yugoslavia until Josip Broz Tito's death.

On 6 February 1981, hostilities began in the south with a PRA attack on the Kabamba Military Barracks in the central Mubende District. The attack aimed at capturing weaponry; although the operation failed to capture the armoury, Museveni's group of fighters managed to take a few guns and several vehicles before retreating. The PRA had more success during a series of attacks on police stations during the next days. Regardless, the small rebel group also came under pressure from UNLA and TPDF counter-insurgency operations, and still lacked a proper base. Museveni was familiar with guerrilla warfare, having fought with the Mozambican Liberation Front in Mozambique. He also had commanded his own Front for National Salvation to fight the Amin regime and had continued to campaign in rural areas hostile to Obote's government, especially central and western Buganda and in the western regions of Ankole and Bunyoro. As a result, he employed the tactics of a people's war to keep his small force active. In this regard, the PRA succeeded, as it won over many locals in the area around Kampala who considered Obote's government a regime which solely served the northerners. Without extensive support by sympathetic civilians during their early insurgency, Museveni's troops would have been easily crushed in 1981.

The PRA also enjoyed very limited foreign support. Some believed that Museveni was aided by his old Mozambican allies, resulting in tensions between Obote's government and Mozambique. Most attacks by Museveni's force involved small mobile units called "coys" under the command of Fred Rwigyema, and Museveni's brother, Salim Saleh, with "A" Coy led by Steven Kashaka, "B" Coy by Joram Mugume, and "C" Coy by Pecos Kuteesa. There were three small zonal forces: the Lutta Unit operating in Kapeeka, the Kabalega Unit operating near Kiwoko, and the Nkrumah Unit operating in the areas of Ssingo. Many of the early members of the PRA like Rwigyema and Paul Kagame were actually Rwandan refugees living in Uganda. They later organized the Rwandan Patriotic Front.

In contrast to Museveni's forces and the West Nile rebels, Andrew Kayira's UFM mostly consisted of relatively well-trained ex-soldiers and was focused on high-profile urban operations. The group hoped to destabilize Obote's government through direct attacks, a strategy which "doomed it to fail from the beginning" according to historians Tom Cooper and Adrien Fontanellaz. The UFM was not strong enough to challenge the UNLA head-on, suffered from leadership rivalries, lacked a firm organization, and was prone to being infiltrated by pro-government spies.

=== Early rebel successes, and emergence of the NRA ===
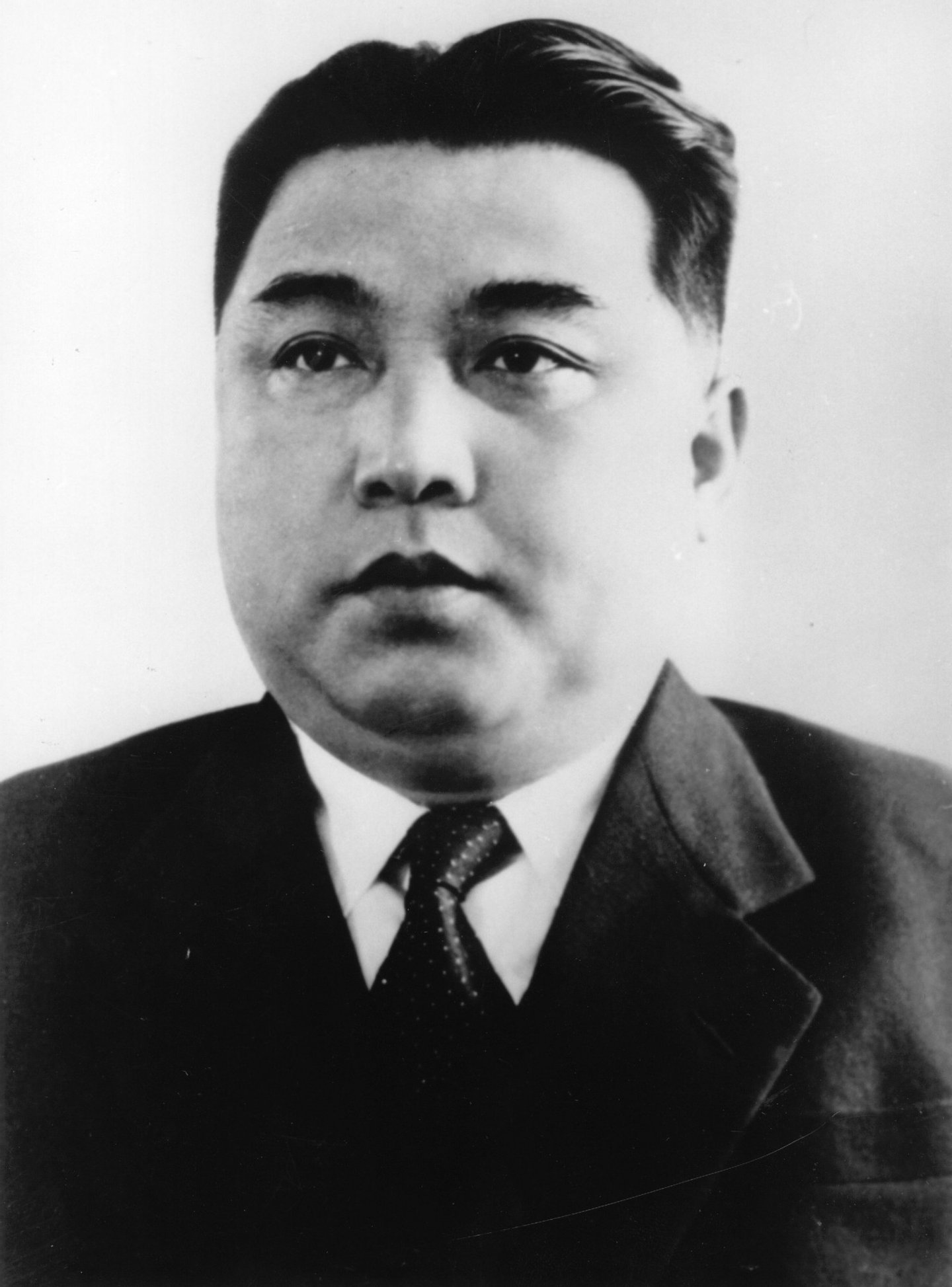
North Korea under Kim Il Sung (pictured) was one of Obote's foreign allies during the Bush War, and provided military equipment as well as advisors.

As the war escalated, foreign support became vital for the survival of Obote's government. The Tanzanians initially helped to defend his regime and kept some order through the presence of about 10,000 Tanzania People's Defence Force soldiers and 1,000 policemen. Nevertheless, the unsustainable costs of these troops led Tanzanian President Julius Nyerere to gradually withdraw most of his forces from Uganda. By June 1981, just 800 to 1,000 Tanzanian advisors remained in the country. These advisors remained of crucial importance for the UNLA, but the Tanzanian withdrawal greatly weakened Obote's position. To compensate, he tried to enlist further foreign aid: He hired a British private military company, and convinced the Commonwealth of Nations (including Great Britain, Canada, and Australia) as well as the United States to send small teams of security advisors.

One of Obote's most important allies was North Korea. The Ugandan President visited the country in late 1981 and signed a cooperation agreement which included military support for his regime. At least 30 North Korean officers were subsequently sent to Gulu in northern Uganda, where they trained UNLA soldiers and repaired military equipment. By 1984, the number had risen to about 50 North Koreans who acted as security, intelligence, and military advisors. Museveni claimed that over 700 North Koreans were ultimately used by the UNLA; Obote maintained that only about 170 were present in Uganda. According to one study, the North Korean officers actively participated in and even led counter-insurgency operations for Obote. A Central Intelligence Agency report stated, however, that the North Koreans refused to actually venture to the frontlines. The Ugandan military also sent some officers and non-commissioned officers to North Korea for advanced trainings. Obote's government also organized various paramilitary groups to assist the UNLA. The "People's Militia" consisted of Langi, Acholi and Teso tribesmen, and was mostly loyal to UNLA chief of staff David Oyite-Ojok. It became increasingly powerful, and garnered a reputation as a fierce and brutal force. In addition, there was the "National Youth Army" (NYA), various tribal militias, and the UPC youth paramilitaries.

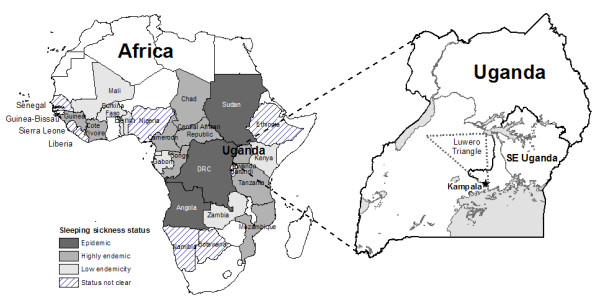
Map of Uganda, showcasing the approximate area of the Luwero Triangle.

Meanwhile, the conflict in the south became more serious. Another rebel group emerged, the so-called "Uganda Liberation Movement" which threatened to kidnap and kill United Nations personnel, as the latter was supporting Obote's attempts at restabilizing Uganda. The threats worked, and the U.N. stopped its training programme for the Ugandan police. The PRA also continued its hit-and-run operations with mixed successes: It overran a UNLA outpost at Kakiri on 5 April 1981, and captured important weaponry, but had to hastily retreat when a TPDF unit responded to the attack. The Tanzanian forces consequently conducted a counter-insurgency sweep, catching a PRA column under Elly Tumwine off-guard and recapturing some of the captured guns. Despite this, the PRA successfully recruited more volunteers, growing to about 200 fighters by early May. In the next month, Museveni travelled to Nairobi where he met with Lule; the two agreed to unite the PRA and UFF into a unified opposition group. The umbrella organization was dubbed the "National Resistance Movement" (NRM) and its armed wing was termed the "National Resistance Army" (NRA). Lule was appointed overall NRM Chairman, while Museveni became vice-chairman of the National Resistance Council and Chairman of the High Command of the NRA. The merger profited both sides: The UFF was extremely weak, and Lule finally gained an actual armed following, while Museveni was provided with important legitimacy, as Lule remained much respected among Uganda's southern population. This was especially important because a strategically important region near Kampala, known as Luwero Triangle, was mostly inhabited by Baganda. So far, the PRA had mostly consisted of non-Baganda, but Lule provided the newly formed NRA with backing from the Baganda, allowing Museveni to expand his envisioned "people's war". The Luwero Triangle consequently became the NRA's main operations area, although the group's center of recruitment remained Ankole in the west. Soon after the merger, Museveni implemented a strict code of conduct for fighters, allowing the NRA to remain highly disciplined and focused despite gradually growing in numbers and absorbing other insurgent factions such as the remnants of the "Gang of Four". By December 1981, the NRA had grown to about 900 militants.

From this point onward, Museveni's forces also started to receive more substantial foreign support, with the Soviet Union, China, and Cuba providing aid. Libya's leader Muammar Gaddafi also opted to support the NRA, although it was made up of forces which had overthrown his old ally Amin. Gaddafi believed that Libya could gain greater influence in central Africa through the NRA than it had previously with Amin. The Libyan support remained very limited, however, with about 800 rifles, a few machine guns and land mines being provided to the NRA in August 1981. Gaddafi demanded that the NRA merge with the UFM and UNRF to receive more substantial support, but the rebels remained rivals and refused to unite. Libya consequently cancelled its support to the NRA in 1982.

While the rebellion in the south grew in intensity, most of the West Nile region remained under rebel control. A local administration began to emerge, and the remaining UNLA garrisons had great difficulties in holding out. The insurgents proved better trained and more effective fighters, and often captured supply convoys coming from the south. In addition, the UNLA garrisons suffered from indiscipline and internal rivalries, sometimes clashing in their barracks. Despite these advantages, the West Nile rebellion was crippled by infighting, high corruption, and lack of actual strategy among the rebel leadership. As the UNRF and FUNA fought each other, the former gained the upper hand and mostly evicted FUNA from West Nile by July 1981. FUNA commander Elly Hassan fled to Sudan, where he was eventually arrested by local authorities. Regardless, the inter-rebel struggle only resulted in the overall weakening of the West Nile insurgents. By 1981, four different insurgent factions were active in northwestern Uganda, all of which claimed to have no direct links with Amin. One West Nile rebel group, the so-called "Nile Regiment" (NR) was set up by Felix Onama, a former follower of Obote. As result of its inability to reduce corruption or provide true stability, the UNRF gradually lost the support of local civilians. The Ugandan government exploited the divisions and chaos among the rebels by launching counter-attacks into Western Nile from 1981, where its regular military and "People's Militia" committed numerous atrocities. By December 1981, the UNLA had retaken much of West Nile while encountering little resistance. Thousands of civilians fled to Sudan in response to the UNLA offensive. However, the UNLA failed to permanently dislodge the West Nile insurgents.

In contrast, Obote opted for a more conciliatory approach with the Rwenzururu movement. Following negotiations, the Ugandan government signed a peace agreement with the rebel group's leadership in return for payments and other benefits to the latter. Furthermore, Obote granted the Rwenzururu region some limited autonomy.

By late 1981, the UNLA was already in a critical situation. Its rapid expansion to over 15,000 troops by December 1981 resulted in a majority of its troops being untrained, badly armed and often unpaid. Corruption became rampant, and great differences emerged between UNLA units. Some, like those that were active in northern Uganda, were given preferential treatment and became relatively reliable. In contrast, the Central Brigade which mostly fought the NRA mostly consisted of barely-trained militiamen. These troops were considered to be "cannon-fodder" by their own commanders. The counter-insurgency operations against the West Nile rebels were thus much more successful than those against the NRA. Overall, the UNLA already showed signs of great strain at this point, and would have probably collapsed without Tanzanian support by the end of 1981. Regardless, UNLA continued to hold the rebels at bay and even scored several major victories. On 23 February 1982, UNLA fended off a large-scale raid by UFM on Kampala, and then managed to inflict high casualties on the routed insurgents. The UFM attempted to reorganize, but retreated into NRA-held areas. It hoped to convince some of Museveni's followers to defect. Instead, a UFM commander defected with a significant stock of weaponry to the NRA, further weakening the UFM.

=== Government counter-offensives of 1982–83 ===
Fighting in the West Nile region occasionally spilled over into Sudan as UNLA troops pursued rebels over the border. This first occurred in April 1982, when UNLA troops crossed the frontier near Nimule and opened fire on a Sudanese Army unit; the Sudanese troops subsequently detained about 20 Ugandan soldiers. In contrast to other belligerents in the area, the Sudanese Army garrisons in south-eastern Sudan were generally well-disciplined and refrained from attacking civilians.

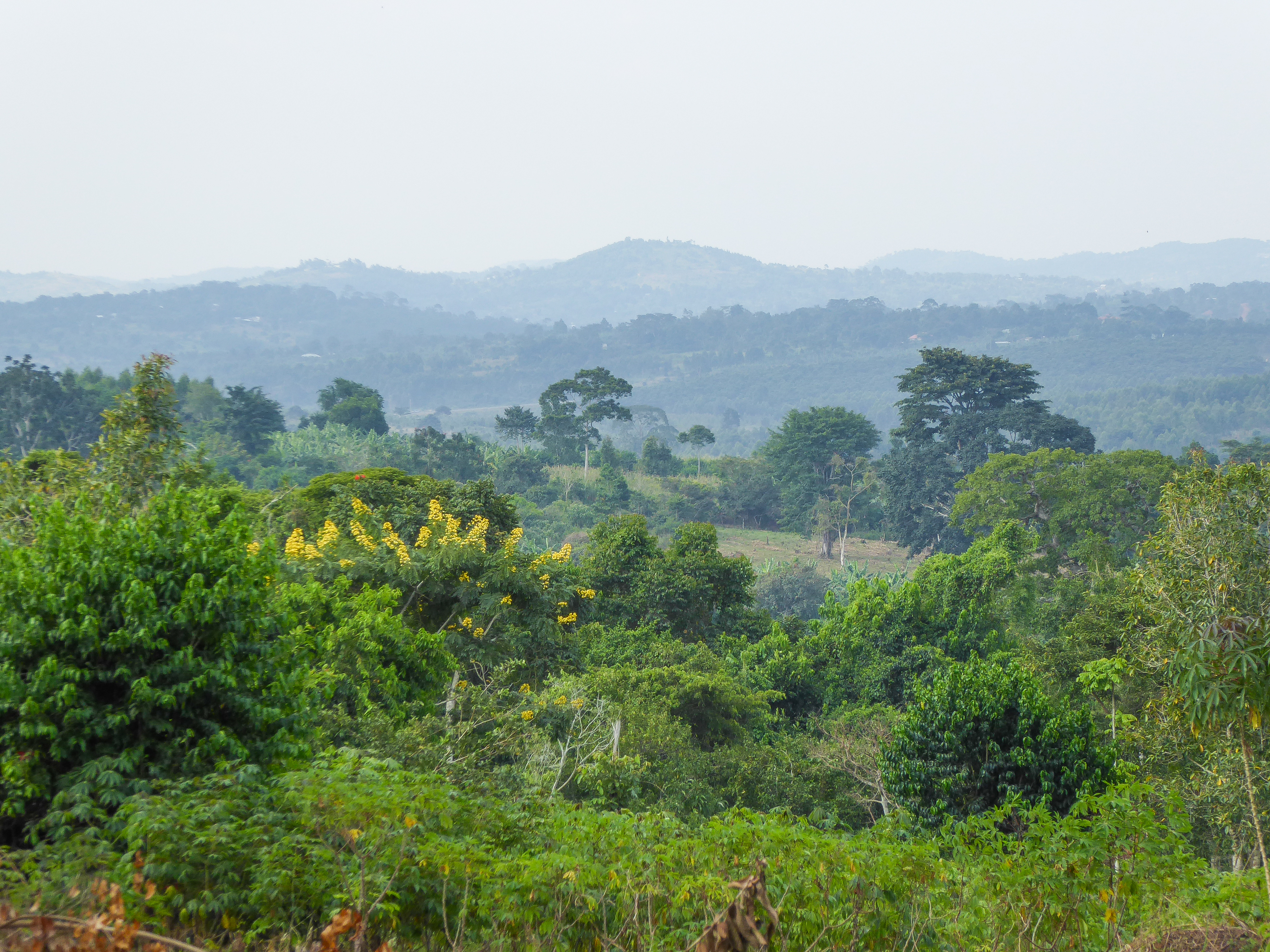
Much of the fighting during the Ugandan Bush War took place in the countryside (pictured: farmland and adjacent wilderness at Mbazzi, central Uganda).

By November 1982, the National Resistance Army, Uganda Freedom Movement, Uganda National Rescue Front, and the Nile Regiment had formed an alliance, called the "Uganda Popular Front" (UPF). Exiled politician Godfrey Binaisa was appointed head of the UPF. While being based in London, Binaisa decided to organize an invasion from Zaire to topple Obote. He attempted to enlist the aid of white mercenaries for this plot, but his plans fell through and were revealed when he was unable to pay for the operation. The entire plot discredited Binaisa. In December 1982, John Charles Ogole was appointed new commander of the UNLA's 11th Battalion in Arua. Ogole reorganized his troops, strengthened morale and discipline, and then launched another counter-insurgency campaign against the West Nile rebels. Ogole's tactics proved highly successful, and ousted most insurgents from the West Nile Region within months. Rebel leader Barnabas Kili was also captured. However, the operation also included widespread destruction and massacres at the hands of the UNLA, whereupon 260,000 people fled the area for Zaire and Sudan. This in turn destroyed the "insurgent infrastructure" of UNRF and FUNA, further weakening them. The UNRF was left mostly destroyed following Ogole's offensive, and relocated from West Nile. The group moved its bases in southern Sudan to northern Uganda, where it attempted to rally the Karamojong people to its cause. In the south, the UNLA under chief of staff Oyite-Ojok waged a counter-insurgency campaign against the NRA in the Luwero Triangle which resulted in the "genocidal killings" of thousands of Baganda civilians. Many government troops deployed in the Luwero Triangle belonged to the Acholi people who became widely hated by the southerners.

On 16 June 1983, the Obote government launched Operation Bonanza, an extensive military expedition utilizing up to half of the UNLA forces, that alone claimed tens of thousands of lives and displaced a significant portion of the population. The operation was intended to be, as Amaza writes, a "typical encirclement and suppression campaign". The blame for the massacres was placed on the people of northern Uganda for supporting the actions of the NRA, which increased the existing regional tensions in the country. The UNLA also defeated the UFM in 1983, destroying its main camps during a coordinated counter-insurgency operation. The UFM suffered another setback when its exiled leadership was scattered during a crackdown in Kenya in July 1983; its leader Kirya was repatriated to Uganda and imprisoned. The group never recovered. Remnants of the UFM, possibly a few hundred militants strong, subsequently formed the Federal Democratic Movement of Uganda (FEDEMU).

Up to late 1983, Obote's government had remained relatively stable and in control of most of Uganda thanks to the efforts of chief of staff David Oyite-Ojok. Though it could not defeat the NRA, the military was able to contain it. Despite this, Obote's forces suffered from tribalism, corruption, and internal rivalries. The UNLA and its allied militias had been expanded too quickly in an attempt to defeat the insurgency: By 1984, Obote had 35,000 to 40,000 men under arms, but just 15,000 had received basic training. As a result, the soldiers were undisciplined, unreliable, and prone to harass, steal from, and murder civilians due to a lack of proper pay and supplies. Although the Ugandan government knew that it could not even feed its large army, let alone properly train or arm it, Obote was unwilling to demobilize troops out of fear that the soldiers could behave even worse if they were no longer employed. Despite its massive military and militia support, the government was also unable to fully suppress violence in the northeast, where Karamojong raiders continued to operate. Obote's forces were at least able to contain the Karamojong cattle raiding, keeping the raiders out of other regions.

=== Fall of Obote and formation of the National Unity government ===
The situation began to change with Oyite-Ojok's death under suspicious circumstances in a plane crash in December 1983. At first, people believed that the chief of staff had been killed by rebels who consequently assumed responsibility. Oyite-Ojok's loyal troops, most importantly the People's Militia and National Youth Army responded by carrying out revenge killings against suspected rebel supporters. After one week, however, rumours spread among the military according to which Obote had arranged the death of his chief of staff due to developing rifts between them. Although Obote's responsibility could not be proven, the rumours damaged Obote's reputation among the military. The CIA determined that Oyite-Ojok had been crucial for keeping the Ugandan government afloat, and had been responsible for "maintaining some semblance of security and order" in the country. With him gone, the UNLA began to unravel. An increasing number of Acholi soldiers believed that Obote was using them as cannon-fodder, while filling the country's leadership with Langi. At the same time, the NRA became more successful at spreading its propaganda, and attracting dissatisfied Acholi army officers to their cause. Foreign support for Obote had also diminished. Besides the still significant North Korean aid, just 50 Tanzanian, 12 British and six U.S. advisors remained in the country.

However, the government initially remained relatively successful in battling the rebels. With Oyite-Ojok dead, Obote appointed Ogole new head of the anti-NRA operations in the Luwero Triangle. Ogole improved his troops' training and included other security as well as civil agencies in his anti-rebel strategy. In a series of operations, he managed to mostly oust the NRA from the region, forcing it to retreat west into the Rwenzori Mountains and Zaire. Conversely, the NRA's main force in the Luwero Triangle managed to escape an encirclement operation in the Battle of Birembo in January 1985, and thus could rebuild its strength in the area. Meanwhile, the Ugandan government decided "to teach the Karamojong a lesson" after raiders had taken advantage of Oyite-Ojok's death to attack his farm and kill over 100 militiamen in the northeast. In cooperation with the Kenyan government, UNLA and allied militias launched a campaign which largely destroyed or seized the Karamojong's food sources in the form of cattle and fields. This left the nomads almost totally dependent on international aid agencies like the World Food Programme and UNICEF for survival.

To the UNLA's shock, the NRA managed to inflict two substantial defeats on the government in June 1985, namely the Battle of Kembogo and the Battle of Rubona. In particular, Kembogo represented one of the worst UNLA losses up to this point, and greatly impacted the military's morale and cohesion. The unrest in the UNLA eventually escalated when Acholi troops mutinied in Jinja and other locations in late June 1985. Rifts subsequently erupted in the government and some political groups such as the Democratic Party attempted to exploit the chaos by gaining control over the military. The news also reached Gulu, where Lieutenant General Bazilio Olara-Okello, an Acholi, was stationed. Fearing that a new government in Kampala might purge the Acholi, he revolted. Olara-Okello gathered a force dominated by Acholi mutineers, and won the support of ex-Amin loyalists from the West Nile and Sudan. Using these troops, he conquered Lira, and then marched on Kampala. The capital fell after a short battle in July 1985, but Obote had already fled to Tanzania. He later relocated to Kenya and finally Zambia. After the successful coup, General Tito Okello was installed as president; this marked the first time in Uganda's history when Acholi had achieved state power. The coup had catastrophic consequences for the UNLA. The new Acholi leadership promptly began to use their new power to disempower and exploit other ethnic groups including Langi, resulting in the collapse of discipline and order among many military units. From then on, the UNLA gradually devolved into "marauding bands" and declined in numbers to about 15,000 troops by late 1985. Some commanders such as Ogole fled into exile. On 23 August, the 196 North Korean military advisers to the UNLA were flown out of Uganda.

Regardless, Okello's government was successful in opening negotiations with several rebel groups, arguing that Obote – their common enemy – had been overthrown. The government reached an agreement with the FUNA, UNRF (I), FEDEMU, and the reactivated UFM. These rebel groups agreed to join a new National Unity government, officially integrated their militias into the government army, and their commanders became part of the ruling military council. Despite this, the ex-insurgents maintained autonomy. Kampala was carved up among the government coalition: UNLA held the center, FEDEMU the south, and FUNA the north. The situation consequently remained volatile, as the government proved fragile, while soldiers and other militants acted with impunity in the capital. Okello also attempted to bolster the UNLA by recruiting large numbers of Karamojong, even though this meant potentially arming cattle raiders. In addition, Okello's government suffered from a lack of respect among the country's elite, as most of its members were uneducated and considered ill-prepared to actually rule Uganda.

In contrast to the other insurgents, the NRA refused to compromise with Okello's regime out of ideological reasons. It only agreed to peace talks in Nairobi after international pressure, but never intended to honor any ceasefire or power-sharing deal. Taking advantage of the chaos following Obote's fall, the NRA took full control of the Luwero Triangle as well as much of Uganda's west and south. It also received fresh weapons shipments from Libya and Tanzania. Museveni's group was thus in a position of strength, and used the Nairobi peace talks to stall for time. It even ostensibly agreed to a power-sharing deal. In truth, however, the NRA prepared its force for a decisive offensive.

=== Collapse of the Ugandan government, victory for the NRA ===
Map of Uganda showing important events of the late war

In August 1985, the NRA launched a series of coordinated attacks that resulted in the capture of significant amounts of territory in central and western Uganda. It besieged and captured the crucial garrison towns of Masaka and Mbarara, greatly weakening the UNLA. In course of these operations, the NRA greatly expanded by recruiting new troops in captured territories and absorbing defected government soldiers. In a few months, it enlisted around 9,000 fighters, growing to about 10,000 troops overall by December 1985. That month, a peace agreement was signed by Okello's government and the NRA, but the deal broke down almost immediately as both parties violated the agreed truce. By January 1986, the UNLA was starting to collapse as the rebels gained ground from the south and southwest, with mass surrenders of government soldiers taking place in several areas. The NRA claimed that the UNLA attempted to disrupt its offensive by inviting a military intervention by Zaire, with the Zairean Armed Forces allegedly clashing with NRA militants at Bundibugyo. Okello's regime effectively ended when Kampala was captured by the NRA on 26 January 1986. Yoweri Museveni was subsequently sworn in as president on 29 January, and the NRA became the new regular army of Uganda. Tito Okello fled to Sudan. Despite this massive defeat, the UNLA attempted to rally once more, and intended to defend its remaining holdings in northern Uganda.

These holdouts were led by Bazilio Olara-Okello, who ordered a mass mobilization in Gulu and Kitgum. Everyone who could hold a rifle, including women and girls, was armed and provided with an ad hoc training. Meanwhile, the NRA continued its offensive, capturing Jinja by late January, followed by Tororo in early February. At this point, the UNLA attempted one last time to stem the rebel advance. It counter-attacked at Tororo, but was repelled. The NRA proceeded to assault the fortified crossings of the Nile, encountering particularly heavy resistance by the UNLA and allied West Nile militias at Karuma and Kamdini. After bitter fighting, the NRA overcame the UNLA's defenses, inflicting "catastrophic losses" on the Acholi troops. With effective resistance no longer possible, the UNLA disintegrated and its remnants fled into exile, along with many former government officials. The NRA captured Gulu and Kitgum in March 1986, while the defeated Acholi soldiers mostly returned to their villages. The war appeared to be over.

== Aftermath ==
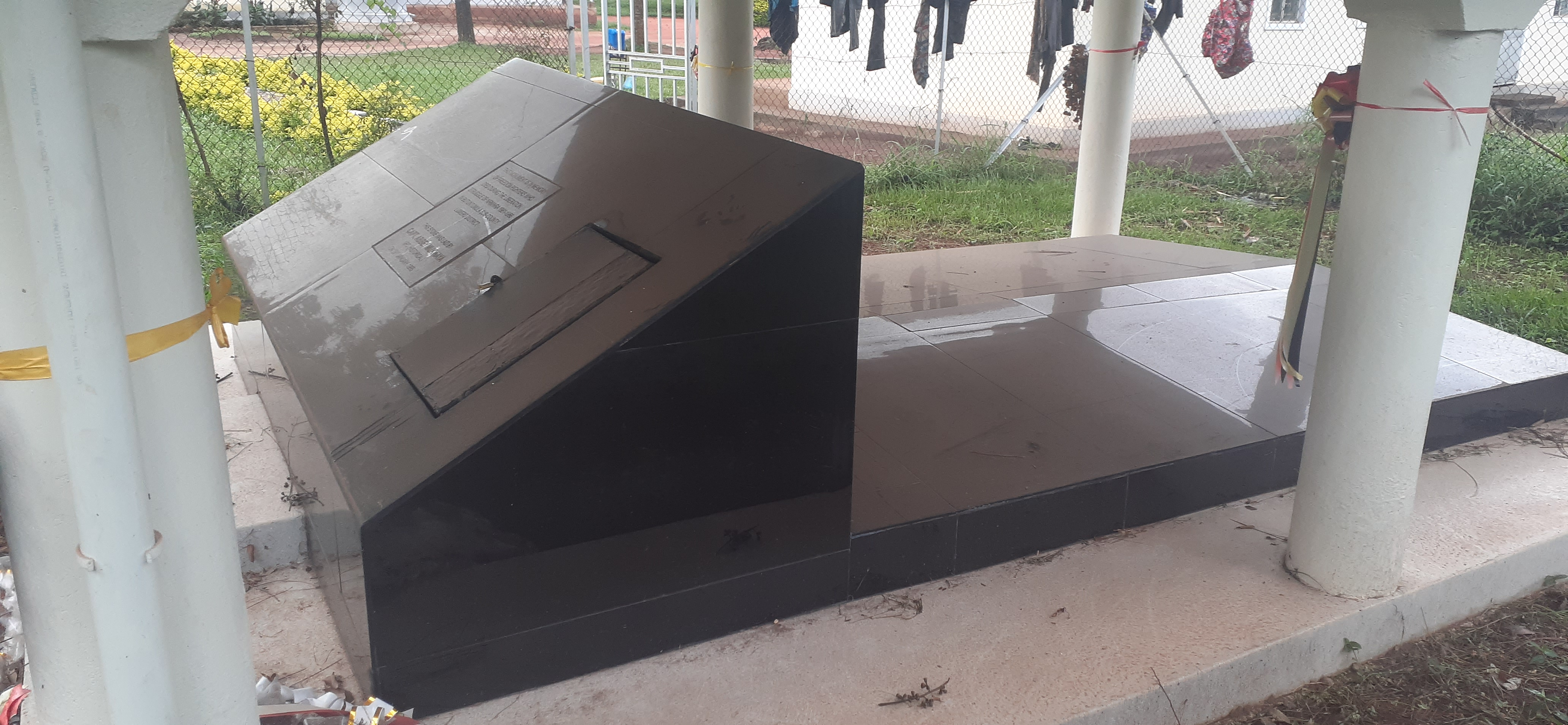
The "Butuntumula War Memorial Mass Grave", one of many mass graves for victims of the Bush War across Uganda.

It has been estimated that approximately 100,000 to 500,000 people, including combatants and civilians, died across Uganda as a result of the Ugandan Bush War. According to University of London professor and historian Richard J. Reid, Obote's regime is generally considered by academics to have been even more brutal, and killed more people, than Amin's; however, this has been disputed, as reliable body counts from the 1970s and 1980s in Uganda are virtually impossible to ascertain.

The NRM's rise to power was initially met by a large portion of Ugandan's population with trepidation and confusion. Most knew little of the NRM, and it was feared that the new government might prove equally incapable and unstable as the previous regimes. After a few months, however, many Ugandans began to view the NRM with approval, as the party actually succeeded in improving stability and restoring order throughout many parts of Uganda. Regardless, Museveni's government quickly faced significant armed opposition. In fact, the NRA had formally won the civil war, but fighting had not stopped in the north. Various anti-NRA rebel groups and remnants of UNLA remained active, with major insurgencies affecting Acholiland and West Nile in particular. The UNLA's Acholi soldiers had never been disarmed, and many had grown accustomed to their lives as soldiers. They were no longer willing to live as peasants, and were dissatisfied with the new government as well as the traditional rule of the tribal elders. Many were extremely poor, and economic and political chaos was widespread in northern Uganda in the Bush War's wake. As time went on, groups of ex-soldiers began to band together as bandits, and violence gradually grew worse in the north. Some NRA garrisons in the region mishandled the crisis by responding with extreme brutality. Though many NRA troops actually behaved well, the army's undisciplined elements tarnished the reputation of Museveni's government. Rumours began to spread that the government was planning to kill all male Acholi. Many Acholi feared that the NRA sought revenge for the mass murders in the Luwero Triangle during the Bush War. In fact, many southerners blamed not just the violence of the Bush War on the Acholi, but even the brutal regime of Idi Amin – even though the Acholi had been marginalized by Amin. The Karamojong ex-UNLA soldiers also took large quantities of weaponry to their home territories after the collapse of Okello's regime, subsequently increasing their raids in scale and numbers. This general unrest contributed to the return of open war to northern Uganda. Over time, the NRM-led government would face more rebellions than both the Amin as well as the Obote regimes, yet survived all of them.

Milton Obote never returned to Uganda following his second overthrow and exile, despite repeated rumors he planned to return to Ugandan politics. Obote resigned as leader of the Ugandan Peoples Congress and was succeeded by his wife, Miria Obote, shortly before his death on 10 October 2005 in South Africa. Tito Okello remained in exile in Kenya until 1993, when he was granted an amnesty by Museveni and returned to Uganda, where he died in Kampala in 1996.

Despite its support for Obote during the civil war, North Korea quickly developed amicable relations with Museveni's government. Cooperation was restored as soon as 1986, and the new Ugandan military consequently received weaponry as well as training by North Korea. The country's involvement in the Bush War had other long-lasting repercussions, however, as North Koreans became a symbol for mystical military power in northern Uganda. As result, rebel groups such as the Holy Spirit Movement went on to claim that they were aided by North Korean spirits in their war against Museveni's government.

=== Human rights abuses ===
The ranks of the UNLA included many ethnic Acholi and Langi, who had themselves been the victims of Idi Amin's genocidal purges in northern Uganda. Despite this, like Amin, the UNLA under Obote targeted and abused civilians. These abuses included the forced removal of 750,000 civilians from the area of the then Luweero District, including present-day Kiboga, Kyankwanzi, Nakaseke, and others. They were moved into refugee camps controlled by the military. Many civilians outside the camps, in what came to be known as the "Luweero triangle", (Note: The Luweero triangle is an area geographically delineated by two roads heading north from Kampala to Gulu and to Hoima and by the River Kafu, where it cuts across the routes. It is located entirely within Buganda.) were continuously abused as "guerrilla sympathizers". The International Committee of the Red Cross has estimated that by July 1985, the Obote regime had been responsible for more than 300,000 civilian deaths across Uganda.

The NRA also committed atrocities, as land mines were used against civilians, and child soldiers were widespread in the NRA's ranks, and continued to be after the NRA had become the regular Ugandan army. In the early stages of the war the NRA also executed some government-aligned chiefs and directed its civilian supporters to murder UPC activists. UPC members alleged that the NRA massacred civilians, though NRA leaders denied this.

== In popular culture ==
The Ugandan Bush War was depicted in the 2018 film 27 Guns. It was written and directed by Natasha Museveni Karugire, Yoweri Museveni's eldest daughter.

== See also ==
- List of massacres in Uganda
- Human rights in Uganda
