= Kabamba, Uganda =

Kabamba
- Location in Uganda
- Coordinates: 00°15′00″N 31°11′06″E
- Country: Uganda
- Region: Central Uganda
- District: Mubende District
- Elevation: 3,900 ft (1,200 m)
- Time zone: EST

Kabamba is a location in Mubende District, Central Uganda.

== Location ==
Kabamba is located approximately 52 kilometres (32 mi), by road, southwest of Mubende, the location of the district headquarters. Its location lies close to the northern banks of River Katonga, where it intersects with Villa Road, approximately 190 kilometres (120 mi), west of Kampala, the capital of Uganda and the largest city in that country. The coordinates of Kabamba are:0°15'00.0"N, 31°11'06.0"E (Latitude:0.2500; Longitude:31.1850).

== History ==
By 1981, Kabamba housed a military base, known as the "Kabamba Military Barracks" or "Kabamba Training School". This location housed "several companies" belonging to the Tanzania People's Defence Force (TPDF) whose members were training soldiers of Uganda's then-national military, the Uganda National Liberation Army. In addition, the base hosted a large armoury.

In an attempt to capture the weapons of the armoury, the Popular Resistance Army (PRA) rebel group under Yoweri Museveni launched a raid on the Kabamba Military Barracks on 6 February 1981 during the early stages of the Ugandan Bush War. The attack failed, although the PRA retreated in good order. The PRA later merged with other rebels, forming the National Resistance Army (NRA) which captured Kabamba later into the Bush War.

== Population ==
At this time the human population of Kabamba is not publicly known.

== Points of interest ==
The following points of interest lie in or near Kabamba:

- Kalama Armoured Warfare Training School (KAWATS) - Located at Kabamba, Mubende District
- River Katonga lies immediately south of Kabamba
- Villa Road runs through Kabamba, in a north to south direction. The road connects the Mubende-Kyegegwa Road to the north, with Villa Maria, a suburb of Masaka to the south.
- Uganda Military Academy - Located at Kabamba, Mubende District.

== See also ==
- List of military schools in Uganda
- Military of Uganda
- Uganda People's Defense Force
