= West Nile campaign =

West Nile campaign may refer to:

- West Nile campaign in 1979, mostly the Battle of Bondo
- West Nile campaign (October 1980)
- West Nile campaign (December 1980)
