= Kakiri =

Settlement in Central Uganda

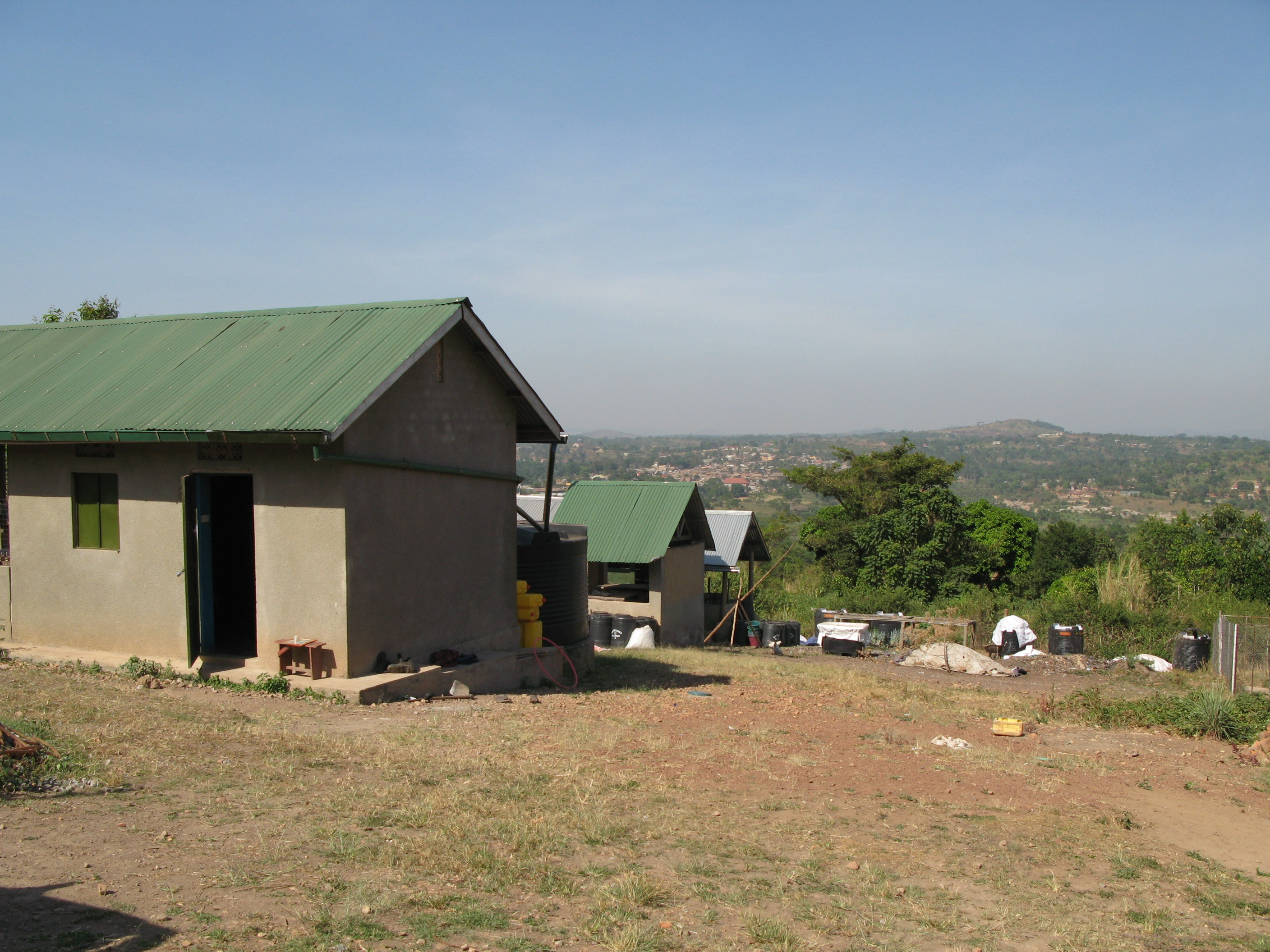
- Kakiri research site

- Location in Uganda
- Coordinates: 00°25′12″N 32°23′24″E
- Country: Uganda
- Region: Central Region of Uganda
- District: Wakiso District
- Elevation: 3,870 ft (1,180 m)

Population (2020 Estimate)
  - Total: 28,100

Kakiri is a town located in Wakiso District in the Central Region of Uganda. Kakiri is the site of the headquarters of the first division of the Uganda People's Defence Force (UPDF). It is also the hometown of Gilbert Bukenya, who represents the town and the surrounding constituency of Busiro North in the parliament of Uganda and is a former vice president of Uganda.

== History ==
Kakiri was affected by the Ugandan Bush War. On 5 April 1981, the town was the site of a Popular Resistance Army raid targeting a local Uganda National Liberation Army (UNLA) camp. In April 1982, UNLA soldiers murdered and buried 55 civilians at Kakiri, accusing them of superstitious activities. One month later, another 20 people were murdered by UNLA troops near the town; the soldiers dumped their corpses along the Kampala–Hoima Road. In late 1982, a National Resistance Army contingent under Salim Saleh raided Kakiri.

== Location ==
Kakiri is approximately 29 kilometres (18 mi), by road, northwest of Kampala, the capital of Uganda. The town is located on the Kampala–Hoima Road, connecting Kampala to Uganda's oil capital of Hoima". The coordinates of Kakiri are 0°25'12.0"N, 32°23'24.0"E (Latitude:0.4200; Longitude:32.3900).

== Population ==
In 2002, the national population census put the population of the town at about 4,200. In 2010, the Uganda Bureau of Statistics (UBOS) estimated the population at 5,800. In 2011, UBOS estimated the population at 6,000 inhabitants. In 2014, the national population census put the population at 19,449.

In 2015, UBOS estimated the population of Kakiri at 20,300. In 2020, the population agency estimated the mid-year population of the town at 28,100. Of these, 14,400 (51.2 percent) were females and 13,700 (48.8 percent were females). UBOS calculated that the population growth rate between 2015 and 2020, averaged 6.7 percent annually.

Historical population
Year	Pop.	±%
2002	4,200	—
2010	5,800	+38.1%
2011	6,000	+3.4%
2014	19,449	+224.1%
2015	20,300	+4.4%
2020	28,100	+38.4%

== Points of interest ==
The following additional points of interest lie in Kakiri or near the town limits: (a) The offices of Kakiri Town Council (b) a branch of PostBank Uganda, a government-owned financial institution (c) Kakiri Central Market and (d) Kampala–Hoima Road passes through the middle of town in a northwest/southeast direction.

The headquarters of the First División of the UPDF are located about 3.5 kilometres (2 mi) southeast of downtown Kakiri.

== Photos ==
- Photo of the compound of the SOS Primary School in Kakiri.

== See also ==
- List of cities and towns in Uganda
