= Patricia Magara =

- Born: 1978 (age 47–48); Nairobi
- Citizenship: Uganda
- Education: Makerere University (Ba.Laws), Maryhill High School, Bweranyangi Girls' Senior Secondary School
- Occupations: lawyer, politician
- Political party: National Resistance Movement
- Spouse: Sam Buchanan
- Children: 2
- Parents: Sam Magara (father); Joy Magara (mother)

Patricia Magara (born 1978) is a Ugandan lawyer and politician who is the Women's League National Resistance Movement party chairperson in Luweero, and a daughter to Sam Magara a Ugandan revolutionary killed in 1982.

== Early life and education ==
Magara was born in 1978 to the late Sam Magara and Joy Magara in Nairobi, Kenya, where her parents were in exile. Her siblings include Emmanuel Noowe, Stalin Kanduho, and Sam Mwerindebiro.

She began her education at an Indian Nursery in Nairobi, and she joined Budo Junior school in 1986 and later Jinja Army Boarding School, where she completed her primary education. Magara studied at Namasagali College for two years before joining Mary Hill High School in Mbarara, where she did her O-levels. She did her A-levels at Bweranyagi Girls and later was admitted to Makerere University for a Bachelor's of Laws.

== Career ==
Patricia's first job after graduation in 2002 was with the Inspectorate of Government for six months, and later worked in State House until 2010 when she joined the Ministry of Justice and Constitutional Affairs.

She is the Women's League NRM party chairperson in Luweero. She represented the National Resistance Movement as the flagbearer for Katikamu South Constituency in the 2021 general elections where she lost to Hassan Kirumira of National Unity Platform. However, in the 2025 party primaries, she lost the flag to Abubakar Kalume and petitioned the NRM Tribunal calling for the results to be annulled, alleging fraud, violence, and result manipulation. The tribunal dismissed the petition due to lack of credible evidence which made her to contest as an independent candidate in the 2026 general elections.

== Personal life ==
Magara is a mother of two children married to Sam Buchanan.

== See also ==
- Sam Magara
- Sarah Najjuma
- Brenda Nabukenya
