= Francis Takirwa =

Ugandan general (1965–2026)

- Born: 7 November 1965; Mbarara District, Uganda
- Died: 7 February 2026 (aged 60)
- Occupation: Military officer
- Title: Former Deputy Commander of the UPDF Land Forces

Major General Francis Takirwa (7 November 1965 – 7 February 2026) was a Ugandan military officer who, at the time of his death, served as the deputy commander of the UPDF Land Forces. He had previously served as the commanding officer of the Second Division of the Uganda People's Defence Forces, based in the city of Mbarara in the Western Region of Uganda.

== Early life and education ==
Takirwa was born in Mbarara District on 7 November 1965. He attended Mbarara Junior School for his primary education. He then studied at Mbarara High School for his O-Level studies. He joined the Uganda Military soon thereafter.

In 1994, he attended a Junior Command and Staff Course at the Uganda Junior Staff College, in Jinja. He then went on to attend a Company Commanders Course at the Tanzania Military Academy at Monduli, in 1998. Later in 2006, he attended an Army Senior Command Course at Nanjig Army Command College, in Nanjing, China. In 2009, he obtained a Diploma in African Strategic Studies from the Nasser Higher Military Academy, in Giza, Egypt. He then attended an Executive National Security Programme at the South African National Defence College.

== Career ==
Takirwa's service in the Ugandan military dates back to 1989. He served in different leadership roles in the military, including a tour in Somalia, as part of the UPDF contingent to AMISOM, from 2011 until 2012. Before his last position, Takirwa was the chief of Education, Sports and Culture in the UPDF. As commander of the 2nd UPDF Division, he replaced Brigadier Kayanja Muhanga who proceeded for further studies at the South African National Defence College.

== Other considerations ==
Takirwa was also an army representative in the 10th Parliament (2016–2021). In 2022, he was appointed acting deputy command of Land forces. He also served as the Chief of Education, Sports, and Culture in the Ugandan army.

== Death ==
Takirwa died on 7 February 2026, at the age of 60.

== See also ==
- Muhoozi Kainerugaba
