= Makongoro Nyerere =

Tanzanian politician

Member of the East African Legislative Assembly
- Incumbent
- Assumed office 5 June 2012
- Constituency: Tanzania

Member of Parliament
- In office February 2004 – 2005
- Appointed by: Benjamin Mkapa
- Constituency: None (Nominated MP)
- In office November 1995 – 1997
- Preceded by: Abdulrahman Kinana
- Succeeded by: Felix Mrema
- Constituency: Arusha Urban

Personal details
- Born: 30 January 1959 (age 67) Tanganyika Territory
- Party: CCM (2000–); NCCR–Mageuzi (1995–2000)
- Parent(s): Julius Nyerere; Maria Nyerere
- Education: Tanzania Military Academy; University of Aberdeen

Military service
- Allegiance: United Rep. of Tanzania
- Branch/service: Tanzanian Army
- Years of service: 1979–1990
- Rank: Lieutenant
- Battles/wars: Uganda–Tanzania War
- Awards: Nishani ya Vita

Charles Makongoro Nyerere (born 30 January 1959) is a Tanzanian CCM politician and a retired army officer of the Tanzania People's Defence Force. He is currently serving as a member of the East African Legislative Assembly.

== Early life and career ==
Makongoro was educated at Arusha, Bunge and Isike primary schools from 1964 to 1972. He then joined Tabora Boys Secondary School where he obtained his ordinary and advanced level of education. From 1979 to 1990, he served in the army and is a veteran of the Uganda–Tanzania War. Following the Fall of Kampala on 11 April 1979, he was part of the Tanzanian troops that remained there to ensure that law and order prevails.

In 1982, he graduated from the present-day Tanzania Military Academy at Monduli where he studied an Officer Cadet Course. Between 2001 and 2003, he attained a degree in strategic studies at the University of Aberdeen in Scotland.

== Political career ==
In 1995, Makongoro joined the opposition NCCR–Mageuzi and won the parliamentary constituency of Arusha Urban in the general election, but lost his seat following a court ruling in 1997. He was succeeded by Felix Mrema of the ruling Chama Cha Mapinduzi (CCM). In 2000, he joined the CCM. President Benjamin Mkapa appointed him as a nominated MP in February 2004. From 2007 to 2012, he served as the party's regional chairman in Mara Region.

In April 2012, he was elected as one of the nine members of the East African Legislative Assembly representing Tanzania. He received 123 votes from Tanzanian Members of Parliament.

In an interview with Mwananchi in March 2015, he neither confirmed nor denied, his interest in the presidency in the forthcoming general elections.

== Personal life ==
He is the son of Julius Nyerere, Tanzania's first president and "father of the Nation". He is a member of the Catholic Church.
