= Andrew Kayiira =

Ugandan politician (1945–1987)

Andrew Kayira
- Born: 30 January 1945; Nkokonjeru Buganda, Uganda
- Died: 9 March 1987 (aged 42)
- Cause of death: Assassination
- Body discovered: Bbunga
- Other name: Lutaakome
- Citizenship: Uganda, United States
- Education: Master of Arts; PhD in criminal justice Bachelor of Science; Bachelor's degree in criminal justice Diploma in criminal justice
- Alma mater: Namilyango College; Makerere University; State University of New York; University of Southern Illinois
- Occupations: Lawyer, professor
- Years active: 1971–1987
- Employer(s): Civil service in the Prisons Department Uganda; New York State University
- Organization: State University of New York
- Agent: Government of Uganda
- Known for: His book Kondoism in Uganda, Leader of the Uganda Political Freedom Movement, former Minister for energy
- Political party: Uganda Freedom Movement Democratic Party

Andrew Lutaakome Kayiira (30 January 1945 – 9 March 1987) was the leader of the Uganda Freedom Movement (UFM), a guerrilla organization that fought the governments of Milton Obote and Tito Okello between 1980 and 1986. Kayiira and the UFM were often seen as rivals to the National Resistance Movement (NRM) led by Yoweri Museveni, which was also fighting a guerrilla war against the Obote and Okello governments. When the NRM took power in 1986, Kayiira was appointed Minister for Energy by Museveni. Later that year, he was arrested for treason but later released. He was murdered by unknown gunmen on 9 March 1987.

== Education and early career ==
Kayiira attended Namilyango College and was admitted to the Faculty of Mathematics at Makerere University but instead he chose to work for the government Civil Service in the Prisons Department where he rose to assistant superintendent. He later won a scholarship to the United Kingdom where he obtained a diploma in Criminal Justice. He then moved to the United States to attend the University of Southern Illinois, where he gained a Bachelor of Science degree in criminal justice and a Master of Arts and a PhD in criminal justice from the University at Albany School of Criminal Justice.

== UK and USA ==
Kayiira completed his studies in the UK with a diploma in Criminal Justice. He was awarded a scholarship by the United States Government to attend the University of Southern Illinois, where in 1971 he achieved his Bachelor of Science Degree in Criminal Justice. In Albany, the capital of the State of New York, at the University at Albany School of Criminal Justice, Kayiira obtained an M.A. and a Ph.D. in Criminal Justice. His doctoral dissertation titled "Kondoism in Uganda" has internationally contributed an addition of "kondoism" as a new terminology in criminology.

Pressed by the vicissitude of the Idi Amin conditions, Kayiira found himself being forced into exile in the United States. He gained an assistant professorship of criminal justice at the University of New Haven in Connecticut. With this base, he reached out to Ugandans in the US. It was his practice that whenever he arrived in a city or town he was not familiar with, one of the first things he did was to pick up a telephone directory, look up Ugandan names, and try to link up with them.

He founded the UF, which he enunciated by means of a newsletter called "SASA UFU". An executive committee was established in 1978, the chair of which was attorney Godfrey Binaayiisa. It was then sensed by the Boston group, which included Henry Bwambale, Kalu Kalumiya, Olara Otunnu, Justine Sabiti, Mubiru Musoke, and Aloysius Lugira, that UFU needed a new leadership. Kayiira was nominated to stand with Binaisa. At the general meeting held in New York, Kayiira was unanimously elected chairman of UFU.

== The UNLF factor ==
The Uganda National Liberation Front was a political group formed by exiled Ugandans opposed to the rule of Idi Amin. It worked alongside the Uganda National Liberation Army (UNLA) that acted as a sister wing in liberating Uganda from the alleged autocratic leadership of Amin. It fought alongside Tanzanian forces in the Uganda-Tanzania War that led to the overthrow of Amin's regime.
