= Battle of Kabamba =

1981 battle of the Ugandan Bush War

Coordinates: 0.25°S 31.185°E

- Part of the Ugandan Bush War
- Battle of Kabamba (Uganda)
Date	6 February 1981
Location	Kabamba, Uganda
Result	Popular Resistance Army (PRA) withdrawal; see analysis for details

Belligerents
Uganda; Tanzania	Popular Resistance Army (PRA); Supported by: UNLF-AD (Note: While the UNLF-AD fighters were not able to participate in the battle, the group was involved in the planning and preparations for the PRA's attack on Kabamba.)

Commanders and leaders
Unknown	Yoweri Museveni; Elly Tumwine; Sam Magara; Hannington Mugabi; Paul Kagame

Units involved
UNLA-TPDF garrison of Kabamba	Tumwine's section Magara's section Mugabi's section Kagame's team

Strength
Several TPDF companies (100+ soldiers) c. 1,400 UNLA trainees	34–41

Casualties and losses
At least 2 killed	1 injured

The Battle of Kabamba (6 February 1981), also known as the First Battle of Kabamba, was the result of an attempt by Popular Resistance Army (PRA) rebels to capture an armoury at the Kabamba Military Barracks, defended by the Tanzania People's Defence Force (TPDF) and Uganda National Liberation Army (UNLA). The battle marked the PRA's entry in the Ugandan Bush War.

The raid was planned by the PRA and another rebel group, the UNLF-AD, to seize weapons in order to start an insurgency against the government of Ugandan President Milton Obote who had assumed power after the disputed December 1980 general election. Despite being prepared through substantial intelligence gathering, the raid faced problems from the start. A part of the rebel strike team, including PRA leader Yoweri Museveni, got delayed. As a result of this delay and a lack of communications, the UNLF-AD militants withdrew, leaving the 34 to 41 PRA fighters to carry out the attack alone. Upon arriving at the Kabamba Military Barracks, the group was unable to deceive or silently subdue two sentries, causing a shootout and alerting the camp. A single Tanzanian soldier consequently took up position at the camp's armoury and defended it, preventing the PRA from capturing it. However, the rebels suffered only very light casualties and were able to withdraw in good order with some loot, meaning that the operation was not a complete failure.

== Background ==
In April 1979, Tanzanian forces and the Uganda National Liberation Army (UNLA), a coalition of armed rebel groups united under the Uganda National Liberation Front (UNLF), deposed Ugandan President Idi Amin during the Uganda–Tanzania War. After the conflict's end, a Tanzanian garrison remained behind to keep order in Uganda. A UNLF government was installed to rule Uganda, but it was weak and exercised little control over the country. This was in part due to the UNLF's and its army's own internal divisions. One group was loyal to Milton Obote, who had served as president before Amin took power. Yoweri Museveni headed another faction, based on the Front for National Salvation (FRONASA). In an attempt to gain influence in the country's future government and military, the different factions within the UNLA enlisted thousands of fighters and began to conspire against each other. As a result of the political infighting and powers of the armed factions, Uganda's first post-Amin provisional government led by President Yusuf Lule was unstable. Lule was dismissed on 20 June 1979, and replaced by Godfrey Binaisa who lacked his own power base. In May 1980, Binaisa was also deposed and Uganda fell under the control of the UNLF's Military Commission that was supposed to rule until the scheduled December 1980 general election. Meanwhile, remnants of Idi Amin's Uganda Army invaded northwestern Uganda, beginning the Ugandan Bush War.

Political infighting also continued within the Military Commission, with Defense Minister Museveni opposing Obote's faction. Over time power shifted to pro-Obote elements in the government and the army. For instance, Obote hindered the integration of thousands of fighters loyal to Museveni into the regular army, with many ex-FRONASA cadres instead being demobilized. The enlisted pro-Museveni fighters were dispersed across the country, preventing them of forming a faction in the army. Even though the demobilization caused considerable unrest within the ex-FRONASA faction, Museveni reasoned with his supporters to surrender their guns to prevent an escalation. Most complied, although some militants refused. At the time, Museveni still hoped that political change could be achieved through the coming election.

Obote won the December 1980 election. The opposition, including Museveni's Uganda Patriotic Movement, disputed the results and claimed widespread fraud. Regardless, Obote assumed power as president, and ruled through repressive methods, including the incarceration and killing of dissidents. Whereas much of the opposition such as the Democratic Party opted for peaceful resistance against Obote's government, Museveni believed that militant action had become necessary. Other political groups such as Yusuf Lule's Uganda Freedom Fighters (UFF), the Uganda Freedom Movement (UFM), and the Communist "Gang of Four" also planned to launch insurgencies. The latter organized an armed wing known as the Uganda National Liberation Front – Anti-Dictatorship (UNLF-AD).

== Prelude ==
When Museveni's faction decided to rebel after the disputed election, its military situation was difficult. The demobilized ex-FRONASA fighters had surrendered most of their old weaponry, and the Museveni loyalists within the UNLA were spread across the country. As a result, a coup d'état was not feasible, and Museveni instead decided to launch a long-term guerrilla war. With a small force consisting of ex-FRONASA officers and his bodyguards, Museveni secretly organized the Popular Resistance Army (PRA). He tapped and expanded his existing network of supporters in Kampala and the rest of Uganda, while trying to organize weapons shipments from abroad. In this regard, he was similar to the UFF and UFM which had been promised arms supplies from Libya. However, Libyan leader Muammar Gaddafi distrusted Museveni as the latter had not just fought against Amin, a former Libyan ally, but also allegedly worked with Israelis, opponents of Gaddafi. Accordingly, the PRA was not promised any Libyan supplies. In addition, Museveni's network already came under strong pressure in 1980. Pro-Obote forces moved to assassinate ex-FRONASA officers in the UNLA to prevent them from defecting or rebelling, depriving the PRA of potential recruits and insiders. Museveni suspected that the pro-Obote forces were also intending to kill him. He repeatedly changed his resting places, often stayed with friends, and only moved around with his bodyguards. Ex-FRONASA fighters also began to carry out revenge killings against ex-members of Kikosi Maalum, loyalists of Obote, worsening the tensions. Despite these difficulties, Bush War veteran and researcher Frederick Guweddeko stated that Museveni told the UFF and UFM that he still had over 10,000 supporters within the UNLA who were waiting to launch a large-scale rebellion. Accordingly, the UFF and UFM decided to wait both for the arrival of the Libyan weapons shipments as well as Museveni's promised uprising within the UNLA to start their own rebellions. For the time being, both groups wanted no unrest which could threaten the arrival of the promised Libyan supplies.

We were going back to reclaim our guns; we knew they were there and we wanted them back.

— PRA veteran Elly Tumwine

In contrast, the lack of foreign aid and growing pressure by pro-Obote elements forced the PRA to act. Museveni decided to cooperate with the Gang of Four; this group's main supporter, Yugoslav President Josip Broz Tito, had died in 1980, meaning that it also lacked foreign support. The PRA and the Gang of Four's armed wing, UNLF-AD, opted to risk a raid on the Kabamba Military Barracks (also known as Kabamba Training School) to finally get access to the desperately needed weapons and ammunition. This desire also possessed a motivational factor, as Kabamba housed many weapons confiscated from FRONASA. Furthermore, the PRA hoped that a successful attack on the camp would boost its image throughout the country and make its revolt against Obote widely known. Most importantly, the attack was supposed to inspire ex-FRONASA fighters, both those who had returned to civilian life or enlisted in the UNLA, to revolt across the country. As the Kabamba Military Barracks were used as a training camp, the location could also be infiltrated by PRA supporters, providing the rebels with insiders and intelligence. In addition, one of the camp's main weapons depots was located just 100 metres (330 ft) behind the main entrance. In theory, the PRA could launch a lightning attack on the camp and escape with as much materiel as possible before pro-government forces would be able to react. Ex-FRONASA members who worked at Kabamba informed the PRA that security at the base usually dropped around 8:00am, when the garrison would switch from a state of alert to go training or take a break. Accordingly, the raid was scheduled for dawn; the element of surprise was crucial for the success of the attack. UNLF-AD militant Emmanuel Kafuniza later alleged that the raid was originally planned for 5 February 1981.

Kabamba housed a substantial garrison. According to researcher Muhoozi Kainerugaba, the base was defended by "several companies" belonging to the Tanzania People's Defence Force (TPDF). Political scientist Jeremy M. Weinstein specifies that the camp housed about 1,500 men, including over 100 Tanzanian guards and trainers; the rest were UNLA trainees.

== Raid ==
=== Travelling to Kabamba ===
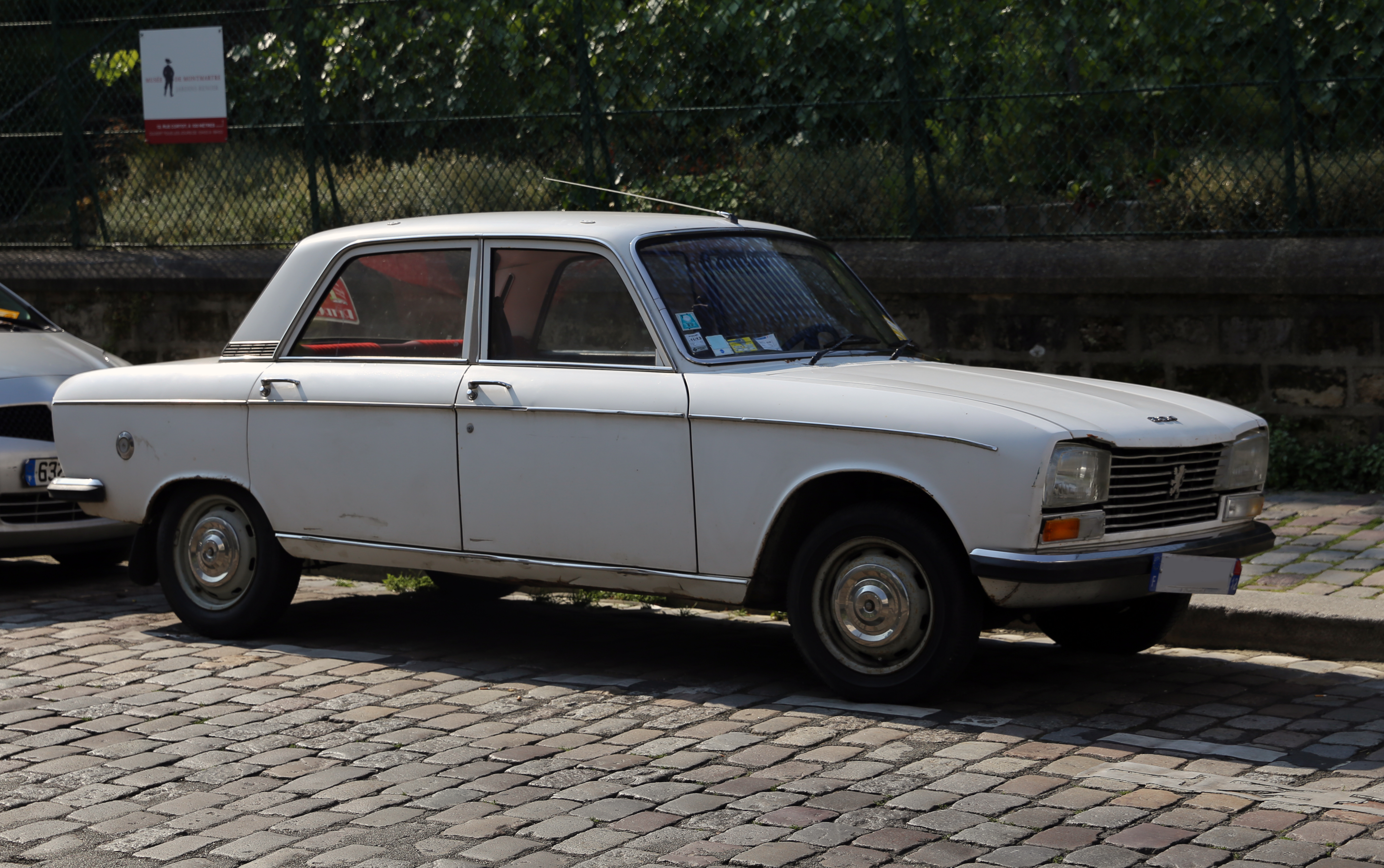
Yoweri Museveni was forced to borrow a Peugeot 304 (example pictured) to get to Kabamba after his pickup truck had a flat tire.

The Gang of Four sent a group of seven UNLF-AD militants led by Kafuniza to meet up with the PRA for the attack on Kabamba. The PRA rebels, consisting of just 34 to 41 militants (Note: The initial PRA force consisted of 34 PRA militants according to Tom Cooper, Adrien Fontanellaz, and Muhoozi Kainerugaba, 35 according to Frederick Guweddeko, 40 according to Emmanuel Kafuniza, and 41 according to the New Vision and an official report by the Uganda People's Defence Force. Jeremy M. Weinstein gives a figure of just 27 fighters.) with 27 guns, left Kampala in two vehicles in the evening of 5 February 1981. The main group drove in a lorry, while Museveni followed in a pickup truck with two companions. The PRA groups wanted to meet up at the old wreck of an armoured personnel carrier near Makoole. The main group, led by Lieutenant Elly Tumwine arrived first, disembarked, and changed into uniforms in the bush. However, the plan already began to derail at this point. Museveni's pickup truck had a flat tire at Katigondo; as they had no replacement, the PRA leader was forced to walk 19 kilometres (12 mi) to Nyendo where he asked a friend, Nathan Ruyondo, to loan him his Peugeot 304. He claimed that he needed the car to get to a relative's wedding. Ruyondo agreed to lend the Peugeot; he would never see his car again.

Museveni and his two comrades finally arrived at the meeting place at 3:00am on 6 February. However, their delay caused them to miss Kafuniza's group that had been waiting at Rwemiyaga since 4 February. The UNLF-AD members, assuming that the PRA had been attacked by security forces, had initially decided to relocate to another position to observe their rendezvous area. When the PRA continued to fail to appear, Kafuniza ordered his men to withdraw to their hideouts in the Rwenzori Mountains. (Note: Guweddeko alleged that the forces aligned with the Gang of Four were the ones who had most elaborately planned the raid, leaving the PRA to carry out a much less sophisticated attack. However, Kafuniza denied that this was the case.) Undeterred, Museveni split his PRA force into three sections: The first, led by Sam Magara would strike at the armoury, the second under Tumwine would eliminate the main gate's sentries, and the third under Hannington Mugabi would try to raid the quartermaster's store. A smaller force of four men with pistols, led by Paul Kagame, was ordered to attack the base's communications room. The militants then drove to Nkonge. Unbeknownst to the rest of the fighters, however, Tumwine had gotten temporarily lost at the meeting point and had not gotten into a vehicle. He was forced to run after the convoy, only catching up at Nkonge. The PRA militants rested for a few hours at Nkonge, waiting until the scheduled start of their attack.

=== Battle ===
At about 8:15am or 8:25am, the PRA lorry, followed by the Peugeot, began to approach the Kabamba base. Before they got to the main gate, Kagame's team disembarked for their attack on the communications room. At the main gate, Tumwine and several other fighters got out of the vehicles, greeting the two sentries. Only one of them, a corporal, had his weapon at hand. The sentries were already suspicious about how the men seemed to take up positions, but Tumwine informed the corporal that they were bringing supplies from the General Headquarters. Seeing that even more fighters were exiting the lorry, the other sentry gradually retreated to get his gun from the guard room at the gate. At this point, the Peugeot suddenly accelerated and raced past the lorry to the armoury. Tumwine then shouted the agreed code word for opening fire, whereupon the militants shot and killed the two sentries. Kagame's team heard the shots, and began their own attack at the officers' quarters.

However, the shooting alarmed a Tanzanian soldier who was guarding the arms depot, and he promptly barricaded himself, preventing the rebels from gaining access. The armoury was constructed from concrete, partially underground, and well defendable, with only two possible approaches, both of which offered a clear field of fire. Using a machine gun, the Tanzanian guard was able to hold off Magara's section. Meanwhile, Mugabi's group ran to the quartermaster's store, where they met two collaborators from the camp who promptly joined them. To get a clear view of what was happening and direct his men, Museveni positioned himself at a mound near the gate. There, he was fired upon from the staff quarters; despite Tumwine's requests that he take cover, Museveni refused, remaining on the mound. Having failed at breaking through, Magara drove the Peugeot back to the gate and informed the PRA leader that the assault on the armoury had failed. Museveni responded by ordering a renewed attack with Tumwine's fighters supporting Magara's section. This time, the rebels got closer, with one PRA militant able to throw a grenade into the armoury; however, it did not explode. Another shot an RPG at the arms depot, but it did little damage. Both Magara and Tumwine came to the conclusion that their attack was lasting too long, and gave the camp's garrison the opportunity to organize a counter-attack. Accordingly, they decided to break off the assault and withdrew.

With the troops of Magara and Tumwine back at the gate, Museveni agreed to retreat, but first ordered his men to take whatever guns and ammunition they could find at the parts of the camp which they had taken, namely the guardroom, communications center, and military transport section. With 13 additional guns and six or eight vehicles which they had captured, the PRA militants withdrew and drove to Nabingola. The entire battle lasted about an hour, and the rebels suffered only one casualty, with one PRA militant being shot in the leg.

== Analysis ==
Kainerugaba summarized that the PRA assault on Kabamba became generally known as "somewhat of a botched job". Researchers Tom Cooper and Adrien Fontanellaz argued that the battle constituted a "partial failure" for the PRA. Guweddeko called it a "useless attack" which ultimately only alerted Obote to the start of an insurgency in southern Uganda, causing him to increase security and thus prevent foreign arms shipments from reaching the rebels in Uganda. Directly after the battle, several PRA members regarded their raid as a failure, and Museveni had to raise their morale by framing the operation as a partial success.

Kainerugaba cautioned that the common negative assessments of the Kabamba raid are not entirely warranted. He described the rebels' intelligence gathering before the raid as "first rate", and argued that the PRA's ability to dominate the battle despite being numerically extremely inferior to the base's defenders was impressive. He also pointed out that the rebels had been able to achieve all objectives besides their main aim of capturing the armoury, as they had held all administrative and communications nodes in the base for an hour. Comparing it to the start of another guerrilla war, namely Fidel Castro's attack on the Moncada Barracks, Kainerugaba stated that Museveni's operation actually went rather well, and concluded that it was a "qualified success and not a catastrophe".

Both analysts as well as participants of the battle agreed that the main reason for the PRA's failure to take the armoury was the loss of the element of surprise. When Tumwine shot one of the sentries, he warned the rest of the base; Museveni later argued that Tumwine should have tried to subdue the sentry physically. Journalist Derrick Kiyonga agreed, stating that Tumwine "bungled up the operation" by firing the first shot. However, Kainerugaba pointed out that the preparations for the battle had not included instructions to tackle opponents without guns: Tumwine had no training in hand-to-hand combat, and the attackers had no knives. Furthermore, the rebels lacked explosives to forcibly enter the armoury. Kainerugaba argued that this lack of contingency planning was the main reason why the operation derailed.

Kainerugaba claimed that the Battle of Kabamba was "immensely significant both strategically and symbolically", as it signalled for ex-FRONASA members to join the anti-Obote rebellion and involved two future presidents, namely Museveni and Kagame, both of whom had an immense impact on the future history of the African Great Lakes. In addition, influential Rwandan politician and militant Fred Rwigyema was also part of the PRA force at Kabamba.

== Aftermath ==
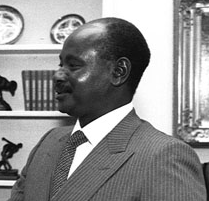
Yoweri Museveni (pictured 1987) became President of Uganda in 1986.

The attack on Kabama officially marked the start of the PRA's rebellion. Using the small amount of captured equipment, the PRA began to raid police stations. However, the group were attacked by a joined UNLA-TPDF force at Kiboga on 9 February, forcing it to scatter. A few rebels decided to give up at this point, but the rest reunited and continued a low-level insurgency. The assault on Kabama caused Obote's security forces to increase controls; this prevented the Libyan arms shipments from reaching the UFF and UFM, causing them to accuse Museveni of having acted too soon. Meanwhile, the forces of the "Gang of Four" gradually scattered, having been demoralized by their inability to take part in the Kabamba raid and still lacking guns. The UNLF-AD continued to wage a fairly effective propaganda campaign against Obote, but was never able to become a major militant group. The group stopped its independent insurgency in July 1982. However, several of its members went on to cooperate with Museveni's forces during the Bush War's remainder, and eventually fully joined his group.

In June 1981, a new rebel coalition was organised, with the PRA and Lule's UFF agreeing to unite as the National Resistance Movement (NRM). Museveni was made vice-chairman of the National Resistance Council, the group's political body, and Chairman of the High Command of the National Resistance Army (NRA), the Movement's armed organ. Later into the war, the NRA would conquer Kabamba on New Year's Day 1985. In 1986, the NRA overthrew the UNLA military government and Museveni became President of Uganda.

The start of the PRA's rebellion, and with it the Battle of Kabamba, is annually commemorated as part of the "Tarehe Sita" celebrations by the Uganda People's Defence Force, Uganda's current national military and the NRA's successor organization.
