= Mbazzi =

- Map of Uganda showing the location of Mbazzi
- Coordinates: 00°17′25″N 32°20′12″E
- Country: Uganda
- Region: Central Uganda
- District: Mpigi District
- Time zone: UTC+3 (EAT)

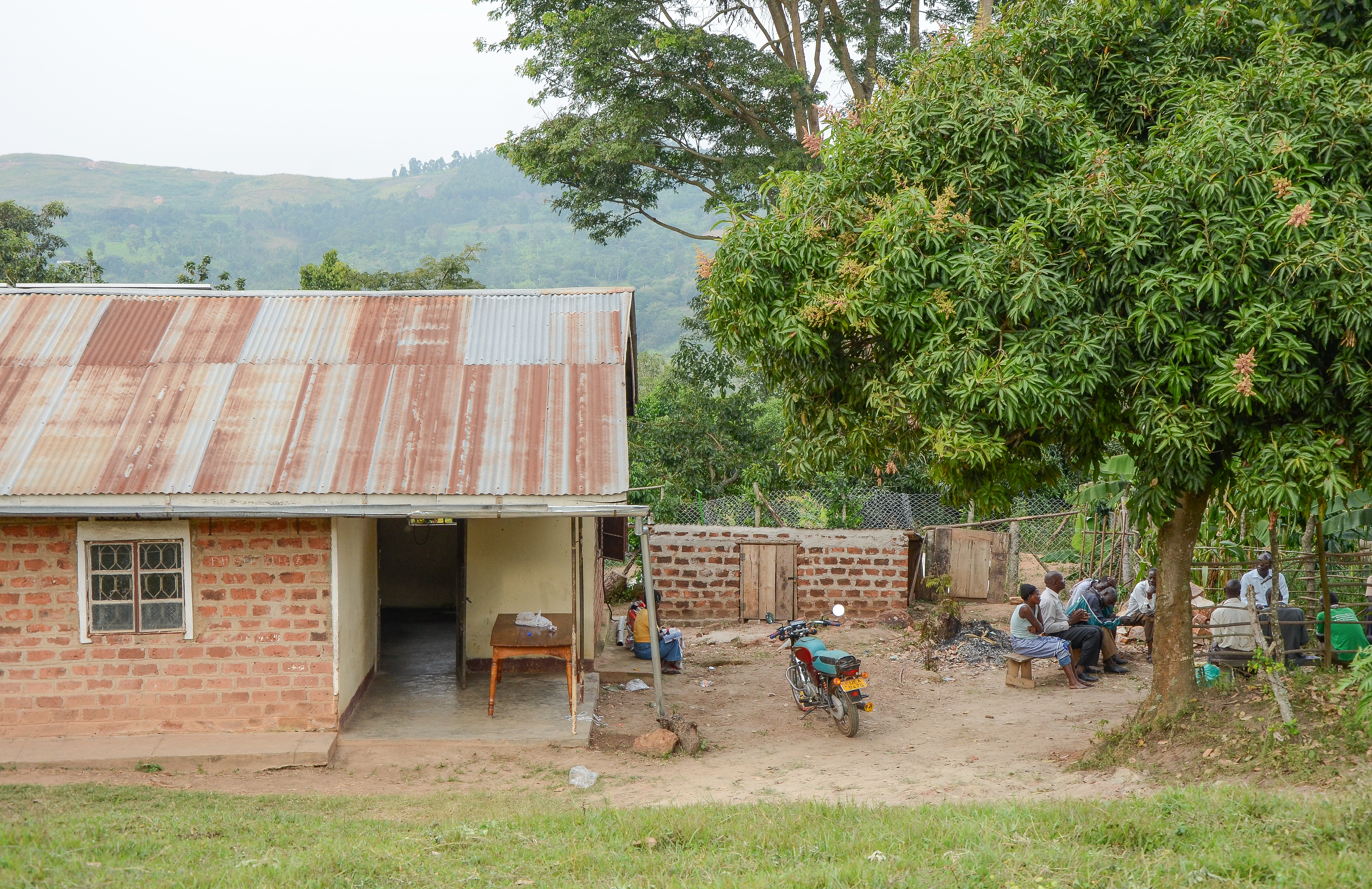
Mbazzi Wikipedia Centre

Mbazzi is a village situated in Mpigi District in Uganda, south of the road to Mityana. The village consists of small farms and a small market place in the central of the village.

== History ==
The first settlers can be traced back to 1830. The first settlers made axes on the hilltops of the area, whereby the village was named axes in Luganda. Back in time the valleys in the area was mainly covered with rainforest and houses were built on the grazing hilltops. Today, the remains of the rainforest are almost extinct.

== Agriculture ==
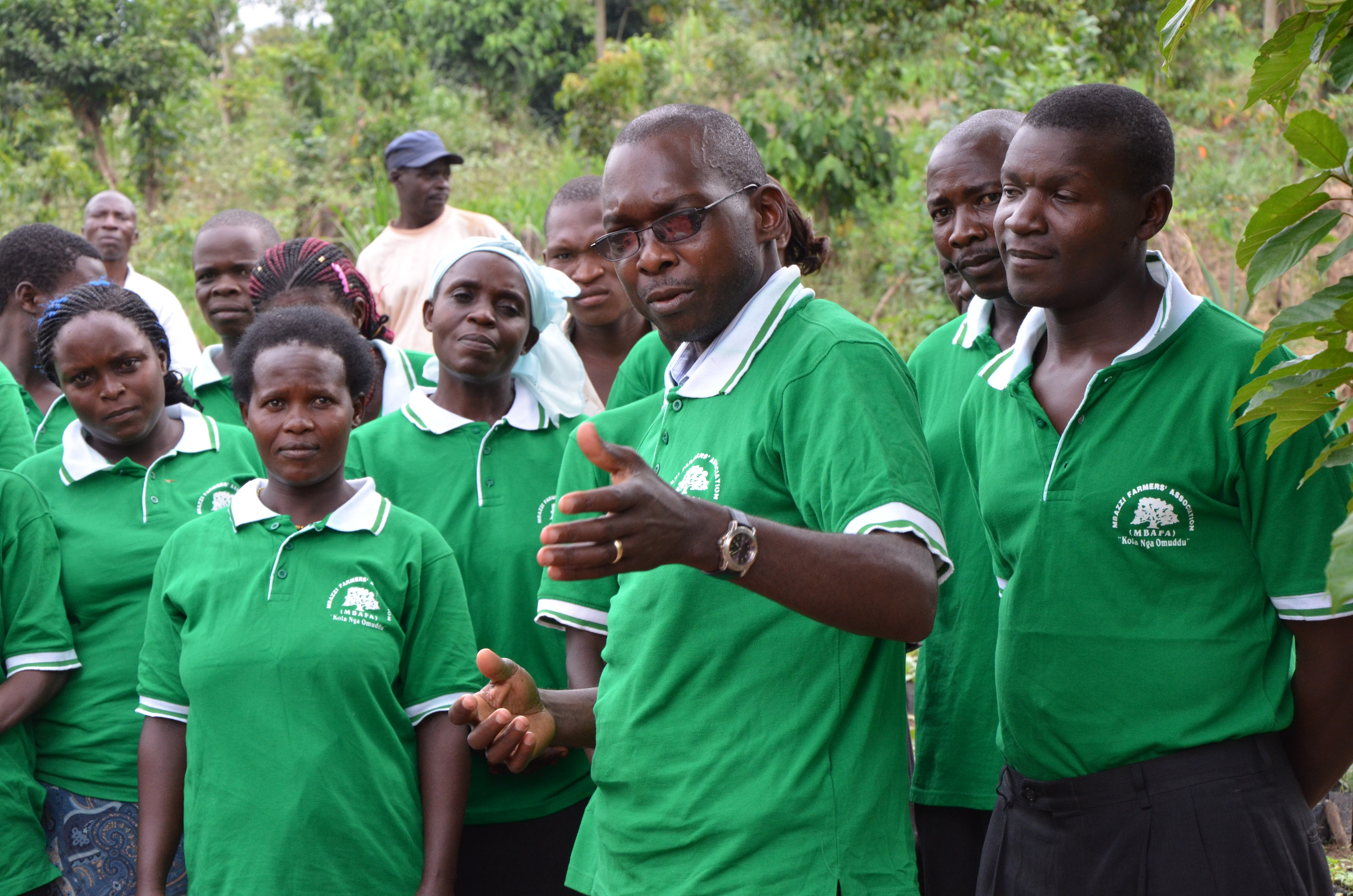
Mbazzi Farmer association

The major economic activity in Mbazzi, as well as in Mpigi District, is in agriculture. The major crops include:

- Cassava
- Sweet potatoes
- Mangos
- Jackfruit
- Coffee
- Maize
- Matoke
- Bananas
- Avocado
- Beans
- Cotton
- Groundnuts
- Cabbage
- Onions
- Tomatoes

In 2013, the local agriculture cooperative Mbazzi Farmers Association was set up, assisted by the Swedish organization Vi-Agroforestry, with the purpose of promoting agroforestry in Mbazzi. and the vision of safeguarding a sustainable local economy.

== See also ==
- Mpigi District
