= Tanzania Military Academy =

- Chuo Cha Mafunzo ya Kijeshi Tanzania (Swahili)
- Former names: National Leadership Academy
- Type: Military academy
- Established: 1 September 1976
- Affiliations: TPDF
- Location: Monduli, Arusha, Tanzania; 3°20′45″S 36°27′28″E

The Tanzania Military Academy (TMA) (Chuo Cha Mafunzo ya Kijeshi Tanzania, in Swahili) is a military training academy located in Monduli District of Arusha Region in Tanzania. It is regarded as the most prestigious training institution in the country and has trained officers from a number of countries across the East African region.

== History ==
The academy was constructed with assistance from the Government of China and was formally inaugurated by President Julius Nyerere in 1976. At inception, it was known as the National Leadership Academy (Swahili: Chuo cha Taifa cha Uongozi) before being renamed its present name in 1992 after the country transitioned to a multiparty system. Over the years, it has trained officers from Kenya, Lesotho, Seychelles, South Africa, Zambia and Uganda.

== Notable alumni ==
- Jakaya Kikwete, 1976
- Katumba Wamala
- Elly Tumwine
- Joseph Semwanga
- Makongoro Nyerere
- Yusuf Makamba
- Venance Salvatory Mabeyo
- John Mutwa
- Sam Magara

== See also ==
- Tanzania People's Defence Force
