= Uganda Freedom Fighters =

The Uganda Freedom Fighters (UFF), also known as the Buganda Army, was a Ugandan rebel group led by former president Yusufu Lule. Opposed to Milton Obote's government, the group fought in the Ugandan Bush War. By early 1981, the group was based in the forests between Matugga and Kapeeka, and it operated in the forests of Mukono, Luweero, and Mubende. The UFF was supposed to receive weapons shipments from Libya, but these never arrived due to Obote's military increasing security after the Battle of Kabamba in February 1981. The UFF eventually merged with Yoweri Museveni's Popular Resistance Army to create the National Resistance Army (NRA). The NRA would go on to topple the military junta of Tito Okello and take power in 1986.
