= Popular Resistance Army =

1980 rebel group in Uganda

- Leader: Yoweri Museveni
- Dates active: c. 1980/1981 – June 1981
- Active regions: Southwestern Uganda

The Popular Resistance Army, also known as Movement for the Struggle for Political Rights, was a rebel group organized around late 1980 and early 1981 by Yoweri Museveni to fight against the regime of Milton Obote in Uganda. It was a predecessor of the National Resistance Army. It relied on military strength and dependence on civilian material assistance to conduct its operations. When it held territory, it would hold elections for committees which managed their villages.

== History ==
Museveni disputed the results of the 1980 Ugandan general election, claiming that Obote had only won through fraud. Believing that he could only topple Obote's government by waging a guerrilla war and fearful that pro-Obote elements were planning his murder, Museveni began to mobilize his supporter network in Kampala and the rest of the country from December 1980. In secret, he organized the PRA with his bodyguards and a small number of veterans who had served in the disbanded Front for National Salvation, Museveni's previous rebel group and private army.

As his group lacked foreign supporters, the PRA and an allied rebel group, the UNLF-AD, opted to risk a raid on a military base to capture weapons to start their insurgency. This plan resulted in the Battle of Kabamba; even though the PRA failed to capture a significant amount of guns, it also suffered almost no losses during the battle. Afterwards, it began a low-level insurgency, achieving some small victories like the Battle of Kakiri, but also suffering a number of setbacks such as the Battle of Kiboga.

In June 1981, a new rebel coalition was organised, with the PRA and Yusuf Lule's Uganda Freedom Fighters agreeing to unite as the National Resistance Movement (NRM). Museveni was made vice-chairman of the National Resistance Council, the group's political body, and Chairman of the High Command of the National Resistance Army (NRA), the Movement's armed organ.

== See also ==
- National Resistance Army
