= Military history of Uganda =

The military history of Uganda begins with actions before the conquest of the country by the British Empire. After the British conquered the country, there were various actions, including in 1887, and independence was granted in 1962. After independence, Uganda was plagued with a series of conflicts, most rooted in the problems caused by colonialism. Like many African nations, Uganda endured a series of civil wars and coups d'état. Since the 2000s in particular, the Uganda People's Defence Force has been active in peacekeeping operations for the African Union and the United Nations.

== Pre-colonial Uganda ==
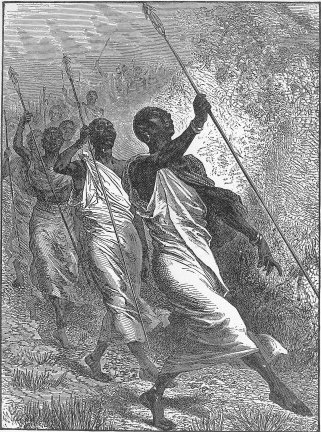
Depiction of the Bugandan army marching in 1875

The region now known as Uganda is divided linguistically by Lake Kyoga into a Bantu south and Nilotic north. The pastoralist Nilotes of the north were organized by lineage into small clans. While cattle raiding was practiced extensively, the highly decentralized nature of northern societies precluded the possibility of large-scale warfare. By comparison, the introduction of plantain as a staple crop in the south around 1000 AD permitted dense populations to form in the area north of Lake Victoria. One of the early powerful states to emerge was Bunyoro. However, chronic weakness within the structure of Bunyoro resulted in a continual series of civil wars and royal succession disputes. According to legend, a refugee from a Bunyoro conflict, Kimera, became Kabaka of the contemporaneous kingdom of Buganda, on the shores of Lake Victoria.

Bagandan governance was based on a stable succession arrangement, allowing the kingdom to more than double in size by the mid-nineteenth century through a series of wars of expansion, becoming the dominant power in the region. As well as a force of infantry, Baganda also maintained a navy of large outrigger canoes, which allowed Baganda commandos to raid any shore on Lake Victoria. Henry Morton Stanley visited in 1875 and reported viewing a military expedition of 125,000 troops marching east, where they were to join an auxiliary naval force of 230 canoes.

Beginning in the mid-nineteenth century, Uganda began to lose its isolated status, mainly due to traders seeking new sources of ivory after the decimation of elephant herds along the coast. Arab traders from the coast began making trade agreements with the Kabaka of Uganda to provide guns and other items in exchange for a supply of ivory. In the north, Turkish Sudan under Khedive Isma'il Pasha sought to expand its control of the White Nile. In 1869, the khedive sent a force under British explorer Samuel Baker to establish dominion over the upper Nile. Encountering stiff resistance, Baker was forced to turn back after burning the Bunyoro capital to the ground.

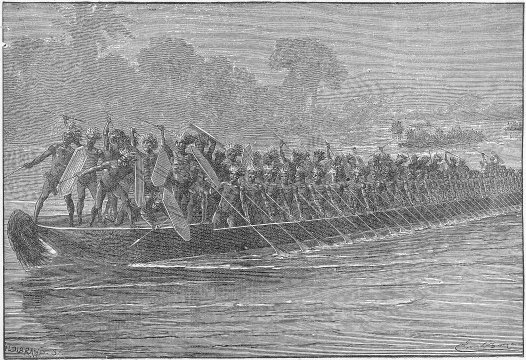
Depiction of war canoes used by the Kingdom of Buganda, c. 1875

Foreign influences led to the eventual disruption of royal rule in Buganda. In 1877, the London-based Church Missionary Society sent Protestant missionaries, followed two years later by Catholic France-based White Fathers. The competition for converts in the royal court also included Zanzibar-based Muslim traders. When the new kabaka Mwanga II attempted to outlaw the divisive foreign ideologies (see Uganda Martyrs), he was deposed by armed converts in 1888. A four-year civil war erupted in which the Muslim forces initially declared victory, but were eventually defeated by an alliance of Christian groups. The conclusion of the civil war was also marked by various epidemics of foreign diseases, which halved the population in some localities and further weakened Baganda. The arrival of European colonial interests, in the persons of British captain Frederick Lugard and German Karl Peters, broke the Christian alliance. Protestant missionaries moved to put Uganda under British control, while French Catholics either supported the German claim or urged national independence. In 1892, fighting broke out between the two factions. Momentum remained with the Catholics until Lugard brought Maxim guns into play, resulting in the French Catholic mission being burnt to the ground and the Catholic bishop fleeing. With the support of Protestant Buganda chiefs secured, the British declared a protectorate in 1894 and began expanding its borders with the help of Nubian mercenaries formerly in the employ of the Egyptian khedive.

== Colonial period (1894–1962) ==
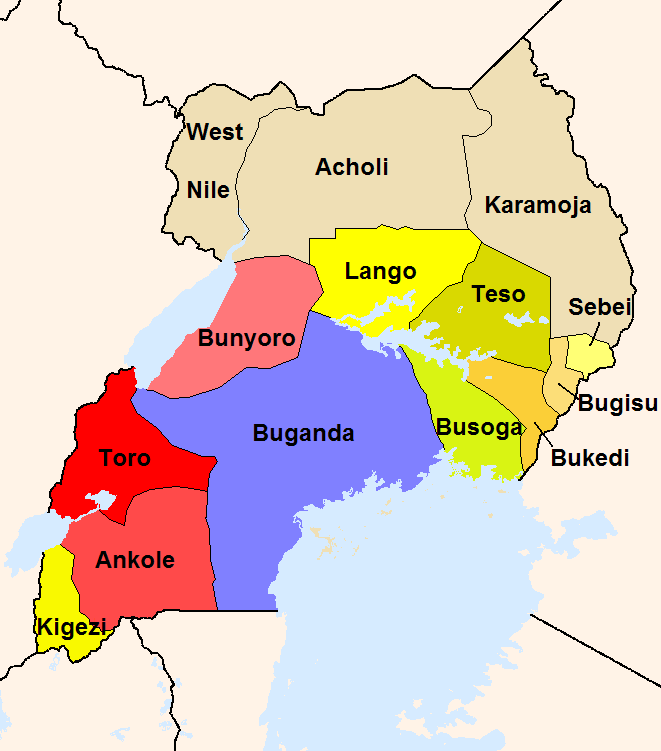
Subdivisions under the Ugandan Protectorate (1926 borders). (Click area to go to article.) The areas in red and blue hues had centralized kingdoms prior to British arrival, while the colonialists introduced centralized rule on the Baganda model to areas in yellow. Areas in khaki never had centralized kingdoms.

In spite of the British declaration, actually taking control of the region was a prolonged affair. The British and their Buganda ally engaged in a bloody five-year conflict with Bunyoro, which boasted several regiments of rifle infantry under the firm rule of Kabarega. After defeating and occupying the Bunyoro, the British forces defeated the Acholi and other people of the north. Elsewhere, the Ankole kingdom and chiefdoms of Busoga signed treaties with the British, but the loosely associated kinship groups of the east and northeast resisted until they were finally conquered. The general outline of the modern state of Uganda thus took shape.

However, in 1897 the Nubian mercenaries rebelled, resulting in a two-year conflict before they were put down with the help of units of the British Indian Army, transported to Uganda at great cost. The protectorate rewarded Buganda for its support during these wars of expansion by giving it privileged status within the protectorate and awarding it most of the historic heartland of Bunyoro, including the locations of several royal tombs. The Baganda offered their expertise in administration to the colonial rulers, resulting in Ganda administrators running much of the country's affairs in the name of the protectorate. The Banyoro, aggrieved by both the "lost counties" and arrogance of Baganda administrators, rose up in the 1907 Nyangire "Refusing" rebellion, which succeeded in removing the irksome Baganda civil servants from Nyoro territory.

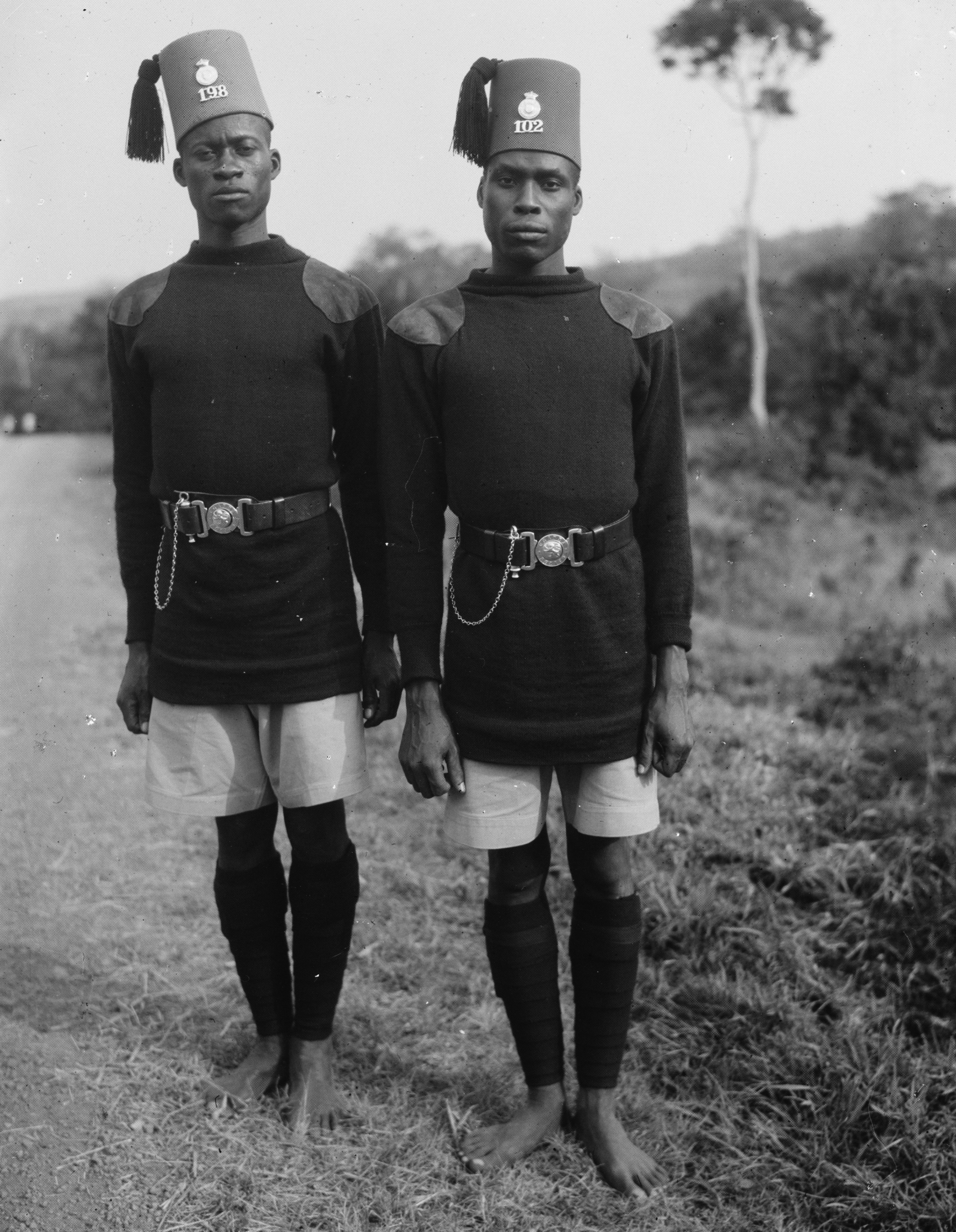
Two soldiers on Jinja Road, 1936

Despite these tensions, the protectorate was generally stable and prosperous, especially in comparison with Tanganyika, which suffered greatly during the East African Campaign of World War I. This began to change with the British decision to divest itself of its colonial properties and prepare Uganda for independence, embodied in the arrival of Andrew Cohen in 1952 to assume the post of governor.

Various groups began to organize themselves in preparation for planned elections, which was given urgency by the announcement that London was considering joining Kenya, Uganda, and Tanganyika into an East African federation. Many politically aware Ugandans knew that the similar Central African Federation was dominated by white settlers and feared that an East Africa counterpart would be dominated by the European settlers of the White Highlands in Kenya, where the Mau Mau Uprising was being bitterly fought.

In the complete lack of popular confidence in his rule, Cohen was forced to agree to Buganda demands for a continued privileged status in the new constitution. The major dissenters were the Baganda Catholics, which had been marginalized since 1892 and were organized into the Democratic Party (DP) of Benedicto Kiwanuka, and the Uganda People's Congress (UPC), a coalition of non-Baganda groups, determined not to be dictated to by the Baganda, led by Milton Obote. After much political manoeuvering, Uganda entered independence in October 1962 under an alliance of convenience between the UPC and Kabaka Yekka (KY), a Buganda separatist party, against the DP. The Kabaka was named ceremonial head of state, while Obote became prime minister.

== Early independent Uganda (1963–1970) ==
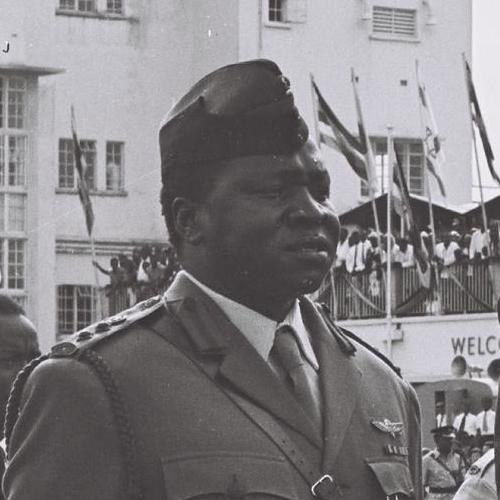
Idi Amin pictured in 1966, shortly after he led an attack on the Kabaka's palace and forced Mutesa II of Buganda into exile

In January 1964, several army units rebelled, demanding higher pay and more rapid promotion. Obote was forced to request the assistance of the British military in putting down the revolt, but ultimately caved in to all of the demands. The obvious lack of civilian control of the military resulted in the rapid expansion of the army and its resulting importance in political affairs. Obote also chose a young army officer, Idi Amin Dada, as his personal protege. Later that year, Obote made a deal with several DP ministers in which they would cross the floor to join the UPC if Obote could return the "lost counties". The kabaka opposed the planned referendum and sent 300 Baganda veterans to Bunyoro to intimidate voters. In response, 3,000 Banyoro soldiers massed on the Bunyoro-Buganda border. Civil war was avoided when the kabaka backed down, allowing the referendum in which the populations of the "lost counties" overwhelmingly expressed a desire to return to the Bunyoro kingdom. In early 1966, Obote consolidated central power by stripping the monarchs of the five kingdoms of their titles and forced them into exile.

The UPC itself fell into disarray in 1966 after it was revealed that Obote and his associates, including Amin, were smuggling arms to a secessionist group in neighboring Congo in return for ivory and gold. Faced with nearly unanimous disapproval, Obote did not take the expected step of stepping down as prime minister, but instead had Amin and the army carry out what was in effect a coup d'état against his own government. After suspending the constitution, arresting dissident UPC ministers and taking the powers of the presidency for his own, he announced the promulgation of a new constitution abolishing the autonomy of the kingdoms guaranteed by the former federal system. When the Baganda protested, now-President Obote sent the army under Amin to attack the palace of the kabaka. The Battle of Mengo Hill resulted in the palace being overrun, with the kabaka barely escaping into exile. With his opponents arrested, in flight, or co-opted, Obote secured his position with the creation of the General Service Unit, a system of secret police staffed mostly with ethnic kinspeople from the Lango region. Nevertheless, Obote narrowly escaped an assassination attempt in December 1969, apparently carried out by Baganda monarchists.

In early 1970, the mysterious murder of Acap Okoya, the sole rival to Amin among the senior military officers, led Obote to grow suspicious of Amin. Later that year, Obote escaped another assassination attempt after the attackers mistakenly targeted the car of the vice-president. However, Obote could take no direct action as he was totally reliant upon the army that Amin led to keep him in power. In response, Obote increased the recruitment of ethnic Acholi and Langi to counter the recruitment by Amin of soldiers from his home West Nile sub-region. In October 1970, Obote put Amin under house arrest on charges of increasing military expenditure over budget, as well as continuing to support Sudan's Anyanya rebel group in the civil war against the government of Gaafar Nimeiry, after Obote had decided to switch his support to Nimeiry. Amin was close friends with several Israeli military advisors that were helping to train the army and there is much speculation that they had influenced him to continue supporting the Anyanya, which was also the recipient of Israeli military aid.

== Under Idi Amin (1971–1979) ==
Despite protestations by Amin that he remained loyal, Obote decided to rid himself of the perceived threat in January 1971. While leaving on a foreign trip, Obote ordered Langi military officers to arrest Amin and his close supporters. However, word of the plot was leaked to Amin before it could be carried out, prompting Amin to carry out a pre-emptive coup. The successful coup is often cited as an example of "action by the military", where the Ugandan Armed Forces acted against a government whose politics posed more of a threat to the military privileges. One of the priorities of the new president was mass executions of Acholi and Langi troops, which owed their loyalty to Obote. In July 1971, Lango and Acholi soldiers were massacred in the Jinja and Mbarara Barracks, and by early 1972, some 5,000 Acholi and Lango soldiers had disappeared. Amin's rule was welcomed by the Baganda, but tens of thousands of Obote supporters fled south into Tanzania. Tanzanian president Julius Nyerere would prove to be a strong opponent of the Amin government, an attitude mirrored by Kenya, South Africa and the Organisation for African Unity, though Israel, Great Britain and the United States were quick to recognize the legitimacy of the Amin government.

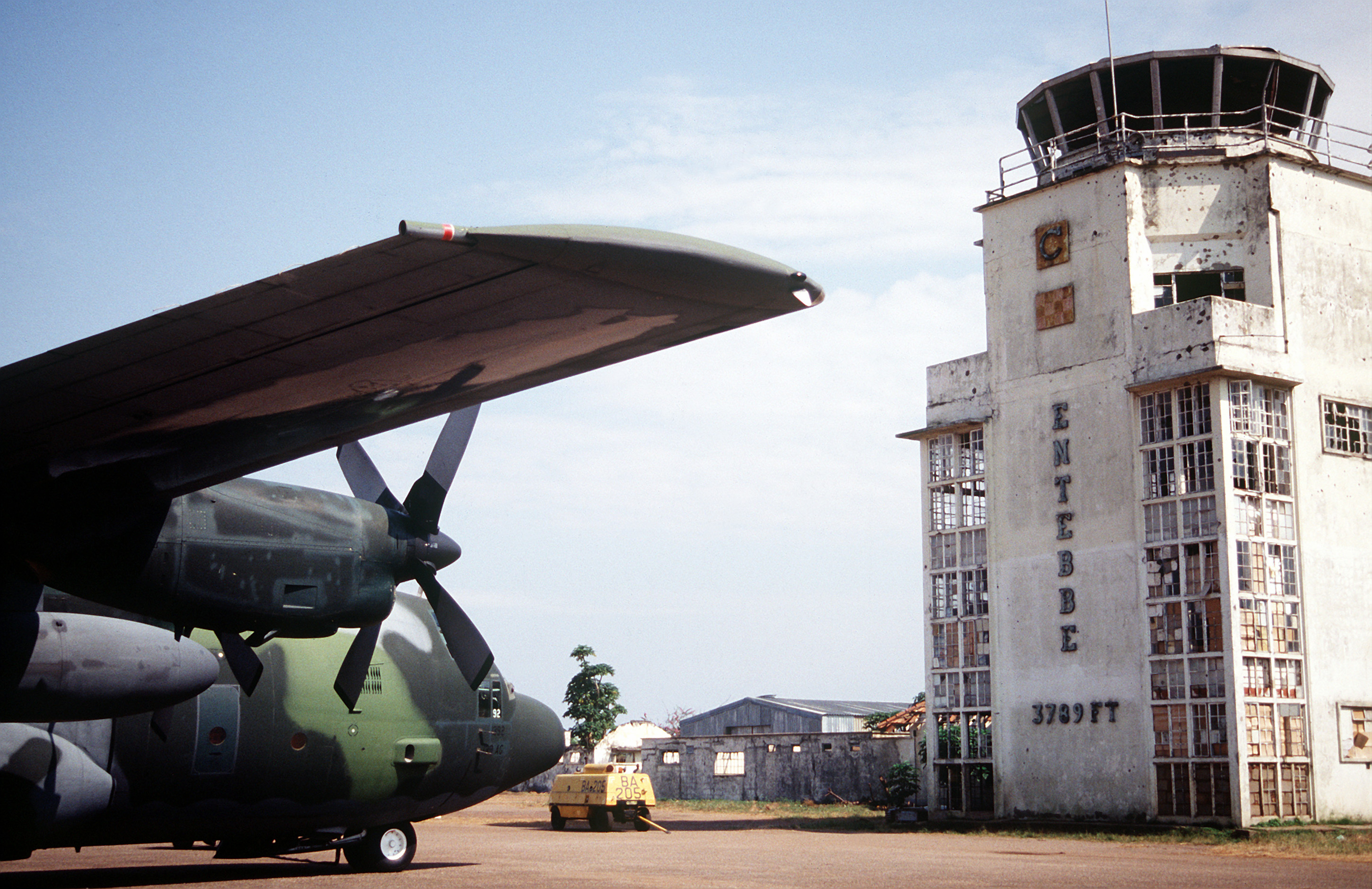
The old terminal building of Entebbe International Airport (pictured in 1994). The terminal was the site of Israeli hostage-rescue mission in 1976. Bullet holes from the raid were still visible on the building.

While the military had grown under Obote, it multiplied in size under Amin, who characterized the government in military terms. He renamed Government House "the Command Post", placed military tribunals over civil courts, appointed military commanders to head civilian ministries and parastatals, and informed civilian cabinet ministers that they were subject to military law. The commanders of barracks located around the country became the de facto rulers of their regions. Despite the characterization of the country in terms of a military command structure, the administration was far from well-organized. Amin, like many of the officers he appointed to senior positions, was illiterate, and thus gave instructions orally, in person, by telephone or in long rambling speeches.

The regime was subject to deadly internal rivalries. One area of competition was a rivalry between British-trained officers and Israeli-trained officers, who both opposed the many untrained officers, resulting in many trained officers being purged. The purges also had the effect of creating promotion opportunities; commander of the air force Smuts Guweddeko began as a telephone operator. Another contest was religious in nature. In order to gain supplies from Libya, in early 1972 Amin expelled the Israeli advisers, who had helped put him in power, and became virulently anti-Zionist. To gain the favor of Saudi Arabia he embraced his Islamic heritage, raising hopes among Ugandan Muslims that their defeat in 1892 would be redressed. Amin deployed soldiers to aid Egypt and provided financial support to the Arab nations during the Yom Kippur War. When Popular Front for the Liberation of Palestine - External Operations and German Revolutionary Cells (RZ) terrorists hijacked a plane in 1976 and landed it at Entebbe International Airport, Israeli commandos carried out a raid that successfully freed most of the hostages. Criticism by the Church of Uganda of army abuses would lead to the murder of Archbishop Janani Luwum.

With his reputation with Western nations in tatters after the hijacking, Amin began to purchase weapons from the Soviet Union. As his regime neared its end, Amin became increasingly eccentric and bellicose. In 1978 he conferred the decoration Conqueror of the British Empire upon himself. The government all but ceased to function as the constant purges of senior ranks by the increasingly paranoid Amin caused officials to refrain from making any decisions for fear of making the 'wrong' one.

=== Anti-Amin rebellion and the Uganda–Tanzania War ===
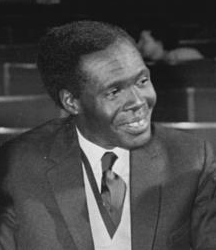
Milton Obote regained power in 1980, after Tanzanian forces aided by the Uganda National Liberation Front defeated Amin's forces in the Uganda–Tanzania War.

Amin was also preoccupied with the dissident groups that Obote had gathered in exile in Tanzania. In late 1972, a small rebel force crossed the border with the apparent intention of capturing the army outpost at Masaka, but stopped short and instead waited in expectation of a popular uprising to overthrow Amin. The uprising did not materialize and the Obote-aligned force was expelled by the Malire Mechanical Regiment. The event prompted Amin to task the General Service Unit, now renamed the Special Research Bureau, and the newly formed Public Safety Unit with an intensified search for suspected subversives. Thousands of people were disappeared. Amin also retaliated by further purging the army of Obote supporters, predominantly those from the Acholi and Lango ethnic groups.

The political environment became increasingly unstable and paranoia-inducing as the regime continued and Amin's circle of supporters grew smaller and smaller due to the purges and disappearances. In 1978, General Mustafa Adrisi, an Amin supporter, was injured in a suspicious automobile accident and units loyal to him, including the once-loyal Malire Mechanized Regiment, mutinied. Amin sent loyalist units to crush the uprising, causing some of the mutineers to flee south into Tanzania. Amin, seeking to deflect blame and rally the populace, then accused Tanzania's Nyerere of being the cause of the fighting and sent troops across the border to formally annex 700 miles of Tanzania known as the Kagera Salient on 1 November 1978. In response, Nyerere declared a state of war and mobilized the Tanzania People's Defence Force for a full-scale conflict. Within several weeks, the Tanzanian army was expanded from 40,000 to over 100,000 with the addition of police, prison guards, militia and others. They were joined by the various anti-Amin forces, who in March 1979 coalesced into the Uganda National Liberation Front (UNLF). The UNLF was composed of the Obote-led Kikosi Maalum and the Front for National Salvation, led by political newcomer Yoweri Museveni, as well as several smaller anti-Amin groups.

The Tanzanian army, with the support of the UNLF, drove the Ugandan forces out of Tanzania and began an invasion of Uganda. The Ugandan army offered little resistance and retreated steadily, spending much of its energies looting the countryside. Libya's Muammar al-Gaddafi sent 3,000 troops to support the Ugandan defense, but these troops found themselves fighting on the front lines, as Ugandan units in the rear commandeered their supply trucks to carry their plunder away. On 11 April 1979, Kampala fell to the invaders and Amin fled into exile, marking the first time in the post-colonial era that an African nation successfully invaded another.

== Disunity and the Ugandan Bush War (1979–1986) ==
The lack of cohesion between the various Ugandan groups that formed the UNLF quickly became apparent as president Yusuf Lule was replaced by Godfrey Binaisa, a former minister in the UPC. While the UNLF force that helped overthrow Amin numbered only 1000, in 1979, Museveni and David Oyite-Ojok, a Langi like Obote, began a massive recruitment of soldiers into what were in-effect their personal armies. When Binaisa attempted to stop this rapid military expansion, he was deposed by Museveni, Oyite-Ojok and Obote-stalwart Paulo Muwanga. After Muwanga's rise to power, Obote returned to the country to stand in elections. In an intensely contested and highly compromised election held on December 10, 1980, Obote was re-elected president with Muwanga as his vice-president. In response, Museveni declared armed opposition to Obote's UNLF government. In 1980, Museveni merged his Popular Resistance Army (PRA) with Lule's Uganda Freedom Fighters, forming the National Resistance Army (NRA). As well as the NRA, two rebel groups based in Amin's home West Nile sub-region emerged: the Uganda National Rescue Front and the Former Uganda National Army.

The beginning of the Ugandan Bush War was marked by an NRA attack in the central Mubende District on 6 February 1981. The NRA insurgency was based largely in the anti-Obote strongholds of central and western Buganda and the former kingdoms of Ankole and Bunyoro. Fighting was particularly intense in the Luwero triangle of Buganda, where the bitter memory of the counterinsurgency efforts of the UNLF's Langi and Acholi soldiers against the populace would prove an enduring legacy. The NRA was highly organized, forming Resistance Councils in areas they controlled to funnel recruits and supplies into the war effort. In comparison, the inability of the UNLF government to defeat the rebels both in the west and West Nile proved devastating to the unity of the government, while the brutality of the counter-insurgency further inflamed anti-Obote sentiment in the occupied areas. Following the death of General Oyite-Ojok in a helicopter crash at the end of 1983, the Acholi-Langi alliance began to fracture. On 27 January 1985, Acholi troops under Brigadier Bazilio Olara-Okello staged a successful coup and put fellow Acholi General Tito Okello into the presidency as Obote once again fled into exile, this time for good. The Okello government had little policy besides self-preservation. After an Okello-Museveni peace agreement broke down, the NRA began a final offensive and entered Kampala in January 1986 as the Acholi troops fled north to their homeland. Yoweri Museveni declared the presidency on January 29, 1986. Estimates for the death toll for the 1981-5 period, which includes the Bush War, conflict in West Nile and internecine UNLF purges and fighting, range as high as 500,000.

== Under Museveni (1986-ongoing) ==
=== Internal conflicts ===
==== Northern Uganda ====
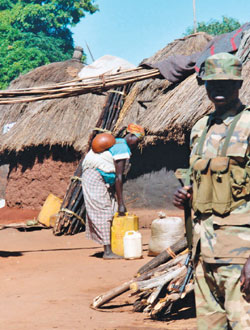
A soldier in an internally displaced persons camp in northern Uganda in 2003. Northern Uganda saw a number of displaced civilians due to civil conflict in Uganda, as well as civil war in neighbouring Sudan.

The new NRA government's occupation of the north was challenged by rebel groups formed among the former supporters of Obote. The Acholi coalesced into the Uganda People's Democratic Army (UPDA), largely composed of former army soldiers, in 1986 while a series of perceived outrages prompted the formation the following year of the similarly comprised Uganda People's Army (UPA) by the Iteso, who were closely allied with the Langi. Both the Acholi and Iteso were subject to a devastating series of cattle raids by Karamojong along their western border, which resulted in loss of much of the region's wealth.

The UPA rebellion reached a height of intensity in the late 1980s, before a settlement was negotiated in 1992. The UPDA rebellion also soon faltered and resulted in a peace accord in 1988. However, the situation in Acholiland was compounded after spirit medium Alice Auma declared divinely inspired leadership of a Holy Spirit Movement to retake the capital and initiate a heaven on earth. While Auma's force was defeated in the forests near Kampala in August 1987, its relative success inspired Joseph Kony, also a self-proclaimed spirit medium, and a relative of Auma's, to form a new group that would come to be known as the Lord's Resistance Army (LRA).

One of Africa's longest-running military conflicts, the hostilities between the Ugandan military, renamed the Uganda People's Defence Force (UPDF) following the promulgation of the new 1995 uganda constitution, and the insurgent LRA have been ongoing since 1987. In September 2006 a ceasefire was declared after peace talks. The LRA is accused of widespread human rights violations, including mutilation, torture, rape, the abduction of civilians, the use of child soldiers and a number of massacres. Operating in a vast swathe of northern Uganda, southern Sudan and the eastern Democratic Republic of the Congo (DRC), the LRA has, at various times, caused the displacement of the majority of civilians in its areas of operations with the support of militias allied with the Sudanese government in its own civil war.

==== West Nile ====
The situation in West Nile, located in the northwestern corner of the country, also remained fluid. While many members of the Uganda National Rescue Front, formed by Amin supporters to oppose Obote, were integrated into the new NRA military, some joined the West Nile Bank Front (WNBF), formed by Juma Oris in 1986 to oppose the NRA government. The WNBF was, like the LRA, highly active along the porous Uganda–Sudan border until a counterinsurgency operation focused on civil-military cooperation was initiated by Major General Katumba Wamala in 1996, which, coupled with Ugandan-backed Sudan People's Liberation Army attacks upon the WNBF's rear areas in Sudan, resulted in the WNBF dwindling into obscurity by 1998. However, some rebels instead formed the Uganda National Rescue Front II, which operated with Sudanese support in Aringa County, Arua District, until it signed a formal ceasefire in 2002.

==== Western Uganda ====
In contrast to the endemic insecurity in West Nile and northern Uganda that continued well past the NRA's rise to power, much of the rest of the country remained stable and relatively peaceful. The one exception has been the Allied Democratic Forces (ADF), a rebel group formed in 1996 by puritanical Muslim Ugandans of the Tablighi Jamaat sect after a merger with the remnants of the rebel National Army for the Liberation of Uganda. The ADF based themselves in the Ruwenzori Range along Uganda's western border with the DRC and by 1998 had carried out attacks on civilians that resulted in tens of thousands of internally displaced persons, as well as thrown bomb attacks on restaurants and markets in Kampala and other towns. By 1999, military pressure by the UPDF forced the ADF into small uncoordinated bands. In December 2005, the Congolese government and United Nations mission carried out a military operation to finally destroy ADF bases in the DRC's Ituri Province.

=== External conflicts ===
==== Great Lakes region ====
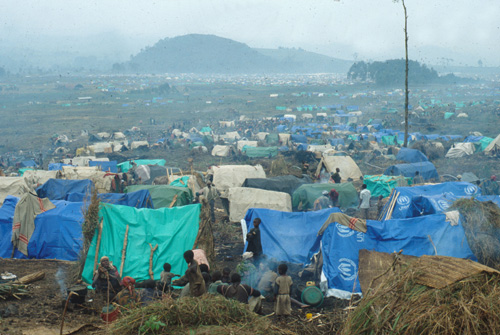
A Rwandan refugee camp in Zaire, 1994. The outflow of refugees after the Rwandan Civil War eventually led to the First Congo War.

During his rebellion, Museveni recruited heavily from the Rwandan refugees located in the southwest of the country; of the 27 original members of the NRA, two were Tutsi refugees: Fred Rwigyema and Paul Kagame. Tutsi refugees formed a disproportionately large number of officers in the NRA for the simple reason that they joined early and had accumulated more experience. After his 1986 victory, Museveni rewarded their long service by appointing Rwigyema to the second-highest military post and Kagame to the post of acting head of military intelligence. Many Tutsi veterans were also members of the Rwandan Patriotic Front (RPF), which was initially created as an intellectual forum. However, a nativist backlash resulted in the refugees feeling increasingly unwelcome. On 1 October 1990, the RPF invaded Rwanda, stating that they were fighting for a just government and the right to return, thus beginning the Rwandan Civil War. With the initial offensive repulsed, the RPF retrenched for a long guerrilla struggle. Museveni would later tacitly admit that he had not been consulted prior to the invasion but, faced with the choice of offering aid and sanctuary to his old comrades in the RPF or watching them defeated along Uganda's southern burden, chose to offer assistance. Roméo Dallaire, the head of United Nations Observer Mission Uganda-Rwanda (1993–1994), would later complain of the substantial restrictions the Ugandan government put on his efforts to discover military supplies surreptitiously transported to RPF-held areas in northern Rwanda.

The start of the Rwandan genocide in April 1994 reignited the civil war between the RPF and Rwandan government. The victory of the RPF in August 1994 prompted a massive outflow of refugees into neighboring countries, in particular Zaire. Zairean president Mobutu Sese Seko had been a strong supporter of the Hutu government of Rwanda, as well as having given Obote military aid in the Ugandan Bush War, and the refugee camps in Zaire quickly became militarized by Hutu insurgents and ex-Rwandan Armed Forces. In 1996, Rwanda sponsored the rebel Alliance of Democratic Forces for the Liberation of Zaire (AFDL), led by Laurent-Désiré Kabila, with the support of Uganda. The first task of the AFDL was to break up the large refugee camps, after which it marched to Kinshasa, overthrew Mobutu and put Kabila into the presidency in 1997. Kabila renamed the country the "Democratic Republic of the Congo" (DRC). (See First Congo War.)

Territory held by combatant during the Second Congo War, in 2003

Kabila attempted to sever his connections with his Rwandan backers in 1998, resulting in the deadliest conflict since World War II, which drew in eight nations and many more armed groups. Museveni apparently persuaded an initially reluctant High Command to go along with the venture. "We felt that the Rwandese started the war and it was their duty to go ahead and finish the job, but our President took time and convinced us that we had a stake in what is going on in Congo", one senior officer is reported as saying. The official reasons Uganda gave for the intervention were to stop a "genocide" against the Banyamulenge in DRC in concert with Rwandan forces, and that Kabila had failed to provide security along the border and was allowing the ADF to attack Uganda from rear bases in the DRC. In reality, the UPDF were not deployed in the border region but more than 1,000 kilometres (over 600 miles) to the west of Uganda's frontier with Congo in support of the Movement for the Liberation of Congo (MLC), a Uganda-backed group formed in September 1998. The lack of Ugandan security forces in the border region allowed the ADF to successfully attack Fort Portal, a large western town, and capture a prison.

The war ended in 2003 with the removal of foreign troops and the country's first election.

Similar to many other African nations involved, the war has created several problems for Uganda. In 2000 the United States Military suspended the UPDF cooperation in the African Crisis Response Initiative until 2003. Several officers in the Ugandan Army have come under attack for their actions during the war.

The Ituri Conflict is an ongoing conflict between Lendu and Hema ethnic groups in the Ituri region. Led by General James Kazini of the Ugandan Army it was a joint operations between the United Nations Mission in the Democratic Republic of Congo peacekeeping force and DRC forces against the Nationalist and Integrationist Front.

==== Sudan ====
In the 1990s, the United States developed the Front Line States Initiative, in which Uganda, Ethiopia and Eritrea were identified as linchpins in containing Sudan. These states were provided "defensive, nonlethal military assistance" against Sudan-backed insurgencies and Sudanese sponsorship of international terrorism.

=== Peacekeeping ===
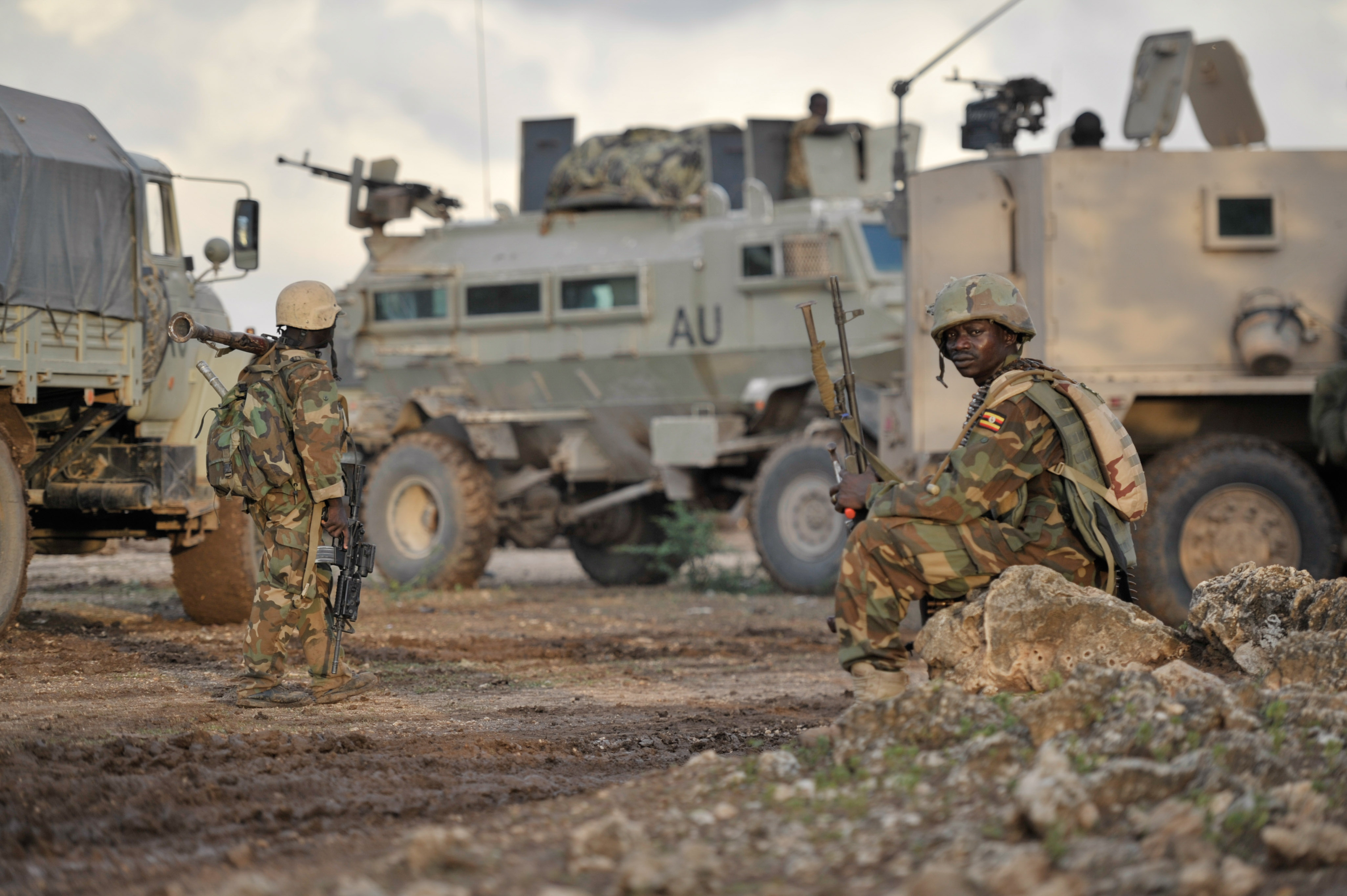
Ugandan soldier, as part of the African Union Mission in Somalia, resting shortly after liberating the Lower Shabelle region from Al-Shabaab

The Ugandan Military has been active in many international peacekeeping missions with both the African Union and the United Nations. It has provided troops to many African Union Peacekeeping missions along with providing civilian police for the United Nations Peacekeeping missions.

Uganda was among the many African nations that have deployed troops as part of the African Union Mission in Sudan, established in 2004 to provide for security and peacekeeping in the Darfur region. This has helped raise the number of troops from 150 up to 3,300. The African Union Mission to Somalia was . The current leader of the African Union Mission to Somalia, established on January 19, 2007 to provide security and peacekeeping in the region during the Somali Civil War, is General Levi Karuhanga from Uganda. Uganda has currently deployed 15,000 troops in the region.

The United Nations Mission in Ethiopia and Eritrea was established in 2000 to monitor the ceasefire that ended the border war between Ethiopia and Eritrea. The mission has remained in place in order to formally mark the border between the two countries. Uganda has deployed military troops to assist in the peacekeeping. The United Nations Mission in Sudan was established in 2005 to monitor the Comprehensive Peace Agreement that ended the Second Sudanese Civil War. Currently there are 15,000 military troops and 715 civilian police. Uganda has currently deployed police as part of the peacekeeping force.
