= Save Uganda Movement =

Ugandan militant opposition group

- Leaders: Akena p'Ojok; William Omaria; Ateker Ejalu
- Dates active: 1973 – c. 1980
- Ideology: Ugandan nationalism
- Size: c. 400 (1978); 1,500 (self-claim, early 1979) c. 17,000 (Sept. 1979)
- Part of: "National Revolt" (loosely, early 1979); Uganda National Liberation Front (from March 1979)

The Save Uganda Movement (abbreviated SUM) was a militant Ugandan opposition group which fought against the government of President Idi Amin from 1973 to 1979. Described as "specialists in sabotage" by journalist John Darnton, SUM attempted to overthrow Amin by waging a guerrilla campaign of bombings, raids, and assassinations. The movement mainly operated from Kenya and Tanzania. Unlike much of the Ugandan opposition at the time, SUM had no firm ideology and was decentralized, consisting of different groups with similar aims, the principal one being the ouster of Idi Amin. SUM cooperated with the forces loyal to ex-President Milton Obote during the Uganda–Tanzania War (1978–1979) and eventually joined the Uganda National Liberation Front which formed the country's post-Amin governments.

== History ==
=== Early guerrilla operations ===
The Save Uganda Movement (SUM) was founded in Nairobi in 1973. Its initial members were Ugandan exiles based in Kenya and Tanzania and its overall aim was to overthrow Amin through guerrilla warfare. Unlike other militant Ugandan factions, like Kikosi Maalum or the Front for National Salvation (FRONASA), SUM was not loyal to one specific leader and was instead split into groups led by Akena p'Ojok, William Omaria, and Ateker Ejalu. Ejalu acted as SUM's "contact person". Other prominent figures in the movement included Yonasani Kanyomozi, Ephraim Kamuntu, Tarsis Kabwegyere, and Richard Kaijuka. At times, Robert Serumaga was also part of SUM, although he later joined the Uganda Nationalist Organization. SUM member Zeddy Maruru was simultaneously a member of SUM and Kikosi Maalum.

SUM members claimed that the group began training guerrillas from mid-1973, teaching them how to use guns and explosives in three-month long courses before they infiltrated Uganda disguised as regular civilians. The group initially launched its raids from Kenya. In 1974, SUM contacted members of the Uganda Army to organize an anti-Amin coup, but the operation was betrayed and two SUM operatives were executed. On 10 June 1976, an unidentified individual attempted to assassinate Amin by throwing a grenade into his car. "Some authors" have claimed that SUM was responsible for the attack, while the Ugandan President blamed the United States' CIA. The overall extent or impact of SUM's early operations is difficult to gauge due to the group's exaggerated claims and the presence of few reliable sources in Amin-ruled Uganda.

After the killing of archbishop Janani Luwum by Ugandan security forces in 1977, Tanzania agreed to train and arm SUM fighters near Arusha. This operation involved 50 militants and was headed by Ateker Ejalu. The small group entered Uganda in early 1978, and attempted to kill ranking Ugandan officials to cause tensions within Amin's government. Although the SUM guerrillas killed a few low-ranking officials in March 1978, most assassination attempts failed.

=== Uganda–Tanzania War ===
By October 1978, there were at least two major SUM factions. One was led by Omaria, an ethnic Teso, and included about 100 fighters. The other was loyal to Akena p'Ojok, an Acholi, and about 300 strong. In course of the Uganda–Tanzania War (1978–1979), SUM mostly conducted bombings, raids, and acts of sabotage to destabilise Amin's regime from within. It also claimed to have contacted Uganda Army officers in an attempt to overthrow the President. Journalist Martha Honey described SUM as the "largest and best organized group" of militant Ugandan exiles at the time. At an early point of the war, Tanzanian President Julius Nyerere invited Ugandan opposition groups to a conference at Dar es Salaam to discuss their strategy to overthrow Amin. SUM attended, alongside FRONASA and the Uganda Nationalist Organization. The Tanzanian government also set up a training camp at Tarime for Ugandan rebels during the conflict's early stages. Nyerere asked several Ugandan exiles, including Ejalu, to send volunteers to the camp to raise an anti-Amin army. The SUM leader complied, although only a few hundred militants ever showed up at the Tarime camp. In December SUM assassinated three agents of the State Research Bureau. In the same month, a rebel boat sank on Lake Victoria; SUM member Patrick Kimumwe drowned during this accident. Over the next few months its operatives, moving across Lake Victoria from Kenya, destroyed a Kampala fuel depot, severed electricity lines, and attacked military outposts.

In January 1979, 200 to 300 rebels from Tarime attempted to cross Lake Victoria to launch a raid into Uganda. Ejalu and Uganda Nationalist Organization leader Serumaga supplied 50 militants for the operation. However, the boats were overcrowded, and one sank, resulting in 82 to 140 rebel fighters drowning. It was suspected that Kikosi Maalum (which was loyal to Obote) had sabotaged the boat, although Obote loyalist Tito Okello had co-organized the raid. Ejalu and Serumaga later sent another force across Lake Victoria, but this operation ended in the loss of the entire rebel team. SUM militants who reached Uganda were either killed, captured by Amin's security forces or ultimately forced to join Kikosi Maalum. The Tarime camp was consequently closed and its remaining rebels moved to Kagera to operate alongside the TPDF at the frontline.

At some point in early 1979, Ejalu made a unity pact with another opposition faction headed by ex-President Milton Obote. At this point, SUM had a neutral stance in regard to Obote's possible restoration to presidency, working with him but preferring another successor to Amin. SUM eventually became affiliated with the "National Revolt", a loose coalition of Ugandan militant groups connected to Obote. SUM and Obote eventually agreed to launch a united raid into Uganda, targeting the barracks at Tororo. However, Obote's faction launched the attack earlier than planned without informing SUM, resulting in the Battle of Tororo in early March 1979 and a defeat for the rebels. SUM blamed Obote's faction for the failure, causing severe tensions. Obote's followers countered that SUM had not been able to organize the agreed number of fighters for the operation. Later that month during the Moshi Conference, SUM and other Ugandan opposition groups united to form the Uganda National Liberation Front and its armed wing, the Uganda National Liberation Army. SUM member Zeddy Maruru was appointed secretary of the UNLA's Military Commission. At this time, SUM claimed to have grown to 1,500 fighters, of which 1,100 were already operating in Uganda. These numbers were probably exaggerated. Regardless, these claims helped SUM to raise funds from wealthy donors.

Though SUM's role in the Uganda–Tanzania War was often minimized in the post-war discourse and literature, war correspondent Al J Venter expressed the belief that SUM crucially contributed to the fall of Amin's government due to its effective sabotage campaign and intelligence gathering for the TPDF.

=== After Amin's fall ===
In course of the Uganda–Tanzania War's later stages, the different Ugandan opposition groups greatly expanded their militias through mass recruitment in territories occupied by the Tanzanians. Following the conflict, these groups developed into private armies and were used by strongmen as well as politicians to enforce their will in post-Amin Uganda. SUM leaders Omaria and Akena p'Ojok were among those who raised large militias. By September 1979, Omaria's group had grown to 5,000 militants, while Akena p'Ojok led about 12,000 militiamen; combined around 17,000. At this time, some leading SUM members like p'Ojok, Kanyomozi, and Kabwegyere belonged to the political "third force" in Uganda who attempted to set up new parties such as the Uganda Labour Congress and the Uganda Patriotic Movement (UPM). The former was not even launched, and the latter experienced great tensions during the founding phase. Negotiations on the UPM's leadership positions between SUM and FRONASA broke down following disagreements over the party office of treasurer. UPM did poorly during the 1980 Ugandan general election.

Ateker Ejalu, Akena p'Ojok, and William Omaria became cabinet ministers in Uganda's post-Amin governments. Ex-SUM member Matayo Kyaligonza later became a high-ranking officer in the National Resistance Army (NRA). After NRA leader Yoweri Museveni seized power in 1986, Ejalu fled to Kenya and reportedly attempted to revive SUM. Ejalu later became a minister in Museveni's government.

== Ideology ==
SUM had no strong ideological position. Its members were described as Ugandan nationalists by Honey and researcher A.B.K. Kasozi. Catherine Thomas described it "as much anti-Obote as it was anti-Amin." In late February 1979 it released a manifesto which stated its aims were "to organise, unite, and mobilise all Ugandans for the overthrow of the fascist regime of Idi Amin with a view to restoring a democratic system of government, law and order, and the rule of law." It stated that once Amin was overthrown, the movement would support the establishment of a transitional government until a permanent one could be elected. The document further declared that SUM was not ethnically or denominationally based, and that the movement was not a political party.
