= Uganda Nationalist Organization =

Ugandan militant opposition group

- Leaders: Roger Makasa; Robert Serumaga; Andrew Adimola
- Dates active: c. 1978 – c. 1980
- Ideology: Ugandan nationalism Conservatism
- Political position: Right-wing
- Size: c. 50 (early 1978)
- Part of: "National Revolt" (loosely, early 1979); Uganda National Liberation Front (from March 1979)

The Uganda Nationalist Organization (abbreviated UNO) was a militant opposition group composed of politically conservative Ugandans who wanted to overthrow Idi Amin, President and dictator of Uganda in the 1970s. UNO operated from 1978 to 1980, taking part in the Uganda–Tanzania War on the side of Tanzania.

== History ==
=== Early activity ===
The Uganda Nationalist Organization was formed around 1978. Its initial leading members were Roger Makasa, ex-chairman of Uganda's Coffee Marketing Board, Robert Serumaga, a Ugandan playwright, and Andrew Adimola, who had formerly served as a minister in Amin's government. The group claimed to serve as umbrella group for all Ugandan opposition groups who were not just anti-Amin, but also opposed to Milton Obote. The latter had been Uganda's president before Amin's takeover and had become a leading member of the exiled opposition.

Soon after its formation, UNO hatched a plan which culminated in "one of the most bizarre tales" of the period, according to journalists Tony Avirgan and Martha Honey. The opposition group attempted to hire Bolka Bar-Lev, an Israel Defense Forces colonel and mercenary, to murder Amin. The Israeli concluded that he would have to raise a commando unit of 200–300 mercenaries (dubbed the "Equatorial Brigade") for the assassination plan, and demanded $1.5 million in advance. UNO could not meet this price, but the rebels offered Bar-Lev any business deal he wanted once Amin was dead; Bar-Lev agreed to aid them in return for a promised casino at the Karuma Falls. UNO ultimately raised $50,000 in advance payments and also covered the expensive hotel bills of Bar-Lev as well as his companions, but the Israeli colonel never actually delivered on his promises, and simply pocketed the money.

=== Uganda–Tanzania War ===
When the Uganda–Tanzania War erupted in late 1978, UNO was internally divided and suffered from disputes among its leadership. One UNO leader, Andrew Adimola, also headed the "Ugandan Redemption and Reconciliation Union" by this point. However, Serumaga and Adimola both refused offers by Obote to join a rebel coalition which the ex-President was assembling following the war's start. In contrast, UNO joined a conference at Dar es Salaam, organized by Tanzanian President Julius Nyerere, to discuss a strategy to overthrow Amin. UNO attended alongside the Front for National Salvation (FRONASA) and Save Uganda Movement (SUM). Despite its internal splits, UNO consequently recruited 50 militants who joined an exiled Ugandan rebel force that was trained to assist the Tanzanians against Amin's Uganda Army. The UNO fighters and other insurgents were put through a military "crash course" by the Tanzania People's Defence Force (TPDF) at a training camp located at Tarime. Serumaga and Adimola enlisted themselves and trained as fighters at Tarime. In contrast to UNO's moderate contribution, Serumaga began to boast to the international press that UNO was training 2,000 guerrillas. These claims helped UNO to raise funds by the Tanzanians, Ugandan exiles, and international companies. There were also rumours about UNO being supported by Israel and the CIA.

In January 1979, 200 to 300 rebels from Tarime attempted to cross Lake Victoria to launch a raid into Uganda. Serumaga and SUM leader Ateker Ejalu supplied 50 militants for the operation. However, the boats were overcrowded, and one sank, resulting in 82 to 140 rebel fighters drowning. It was suspected that Kikosi Maalum (which was loyal to Obote) had sabotaged the boat, although Obote loyalist Tito Okello had co-organized the raid. Ejalu and Serumaga later sent another force across Lake Victoria, but all militants who reached the shore near Jinja were either killed or captured by Amin's security forces. The Tarime camp was consequently closed and its remaining rebels moved to Kagera to operate alongside the TPDF at the frontline. About 30 UNO militants were reportedly integrated into the "National Revolt", an Obote-associated rebel coalition. In March 1979, UNO joined the Uganda National Liberation Front, a large pro-Tanzanian coalition of rebel groups.

=== After Amin's fall ===
After Amin's overthrow, Yusuf Lule was installed as the new Ugandan President. Serumaga became one of his "lieutenants", rising to Minister of Commerce. When Lule was removed from office amid general political turmoil and replaced by Godfrey Binaisa, Serumaga went back into exile. He consequently reactivated the Uganda Nationalist Organization, having reportedly seized a "missing arms depot". However, Serumaga unexpectedly died in 1980. In contrast, Adimola remained a prominent political figure during the following Ugandan governments, becoming vice-president of the Democratic Party.

== Ideology ==
The Uganda Nationalist Organization was mainly composed of "politically conservative professionals" and was described as "right-wing". Serumaga was a well-known monarchist, supporting Mutesa II, the deposed Kabaka of Buganda. In January 1979, UNO joined other Ugandan exile groups at a conference in Nairobi where they passed a resolution calling for the removal of Amin, the establishment of democracy in Uganda, and the restoration of Uganda's "national independence".
