= Zeddy Maruru =

Ugandan retired general (1942–2014)

Uganda National Liberation Army Chief of Staff
- In office 1985 – January 1986
- President: Tito Okello

Commander of the Uganda Army Air Force
- In office 1974 – December 1975
- President: Idi Amin
- Preceded by: Smuts Guweddeko
- Succeeded by: Idi Amin

Personal details
- Born: February 3, 1942 Rushenyi, Ntungamo District, Uganda Protectorate
- Died: January 11, 2014 (aged 71) Mulago Hospital, Kampala, Uganda
- Nickname: "The Colonel"

Military service
- Allegiance: Uganda
- Branch/service: Uganda Army (UA); Save Uganda Movement; Kikosi Maalum; Uganda National Liberation Army (UNLA); National Resistance Army (NRA)
- Years of service: 1964–1990
- Rank: Major General
- Commands: Uganda Army Air Force; Uganda National Liberation Army
- Battles/wars: Uganda–Tanzania War; Ugandan Bush War; Battle of Kampala

Zeddy Maruru (Note: also known as Zed Maruru) (3 February 1942 – 11 January 2014) was a Ugandan fighter pilot and military officer. He was the commander of the Uganda Army Air Force during the 1970s, and later served as the Chief of Army Staff after Tito Okello overthrew Milton Obote's second administration in 1985.

== Early life and education ==
Zeddy Maruru was born on 3 February 1942 in Rushenyi Village, in present-day Ntungamo District. He attended Rwamanyonyi Boys School and Kitunga Primary School. He then transferred to Mbarara High School, before completing his O-Level studies at Ntare School in 1960. Maruru subsequently attended Royal Technical College, in Nairobi, Kenya. He studied pre-engineering courses for two years. He then dropped out of the technical school, after attaining his A-Level Certificate. He returned to Uganda to help his father raise funds to educate his younger siblings.

== Military service ==
=== Early career ===
In 1964, Maruru joined the Uganda Army. He and about 30 others were sent to Jinja for basic military training for three months. He was then sent to Czechoslovakia for pilot training, spending two and a half years there. While there, he trained both as a pilot and as a pilot instructor.

From October 1970 until December 1971, he attended a Staff College course at the RAF Staff College, Bracknell, in the United Kingdom. While there, he was promoted to the rank of captain, by Idi Amin who visited the college in 1971.

Maruru returned to Uganda in 1967 and was commissioned as a second lieutenant. He was posted to Gulu Air Force Base, which was opened after his cohort returned from Czechoslovakia. At Gulu, he completed his training and recruited young men whom he and his classmates trained. In 1968, he was promoted to first lieutenant.

=== Air force commander and exile ===
In 1973, at the rank of major, Maruru volunteered to accompany President Amin on a trip to Iraq. At the end of that trip, Maruru was promoted to lieutenant colonel. He also became quartermaster general of the air force. In 1974, he was made acting commander of the Uganda Army Air Force. In December 1975, Maruru was relieved of his duties as Air Force Commander.

He was dismissed from the Uganda Army in 1975. He went into exile, first to Nairobi, Kenya, then Dar es Salaam, Tanzania. At some point, he became a member of the militant anti-Amin opposition. Maruru joined the Save Uganda Movement (SUM) which intended to overthrow the Ugandan President through guerrilla attacks, helping to set up the group's command centre in Tanzania. When the Uganda–Tanzania War broke out in 1979, Maruru was one of the exiles who organised a pro-Tanzanian militia of Ugandan rebels. As a SUM member, he attended the Moshi Conference which resulted in the merger of several anti-Amin groups into the Uganda National Liberation Front (UNLF) and its armed wing, the Uganda National Liberation Army (UNLA). Maruru was appointed secretary of the UNLA's Military Commission during the conference. At some point during the Uganda–Tanzania War, he became one of the top commanders of the Kikosi Maalum, a contingent of Ugandan rebel troops commanded by Tito Okello and Oyite Ojok.

=== Rise to army chief of staff and later military service ===
In 1979 during the UNLF government, Maruru became a member of the National Consultative Council, which was the country's national legislative body at that time. After the fall of President Godfrey Binaisa in 1980, the UNLA appointed Maruru to the Military Commission to run the affairs of the country.

General elections were held in Uganda in 1980 and Maruru was appointed Brigade Commander in Northern Uganda based at Gulu. He was later transferred to command the Brigade in Western Uganda. He was appointed as Chief of Operations and Training in the UNLA.

When Tito Okello and Bazilio Olara Okello overthrew Obote in 1985, Maruru was promoted to the rank of brigadier and shortly after to major general. He was then appointed UNLA Chief of Staff. When the National Resistance Army (NRA) rebels overran Kampala in January 1986, Maruru was among the high-ranking officers who surrendered there. He met NRA leader Yoweri Museveni at Kampala's Republic House, telling him that he was content to be treated as prisoner of war or be released. To his surprise, Museveni offered him a job in the NRA. Maruru accepted, and went on to serve in Uganda's new national army.

== Later life ==
In 1990, Maruru was appointed as General Manager of Uganda Air Cargo, a state-owned airline that operated passengers and cargo flights. Maruru retired in 2002. In his later life he suffered from hypertension. He died on 11 January 2014 at Mulago Hospital in Kampala.

== Personal life ==
According to his brother Ham Tumuhairwe, Maruru was not very religious and "never liked going to church".

== See also ==
- Uganda People's Defense Force
- Ntungamo District
