= William Omaria =

Ugandan military officer and politician

Member of Parliament
- In office 1996–2001
- Constituency: Soroti County

Minister of State for Internal Affairs
- President: Milton Obote

Member of the Uganda National Liberation Front Military Commission
- In office 1979–1980

Personal details
- Citizenship: Ugandan
- Education: Teso College Aloet
- Occupation: Military officer, politician
- Known for: Member of the UNLF Military Commission; former Minister of State for Internal Affairs

Military service
- Allegiance: Uganda
- Branch/service: Ugandan military
- Rank: Colonel

William Omaria Lo Arapai was a Ugandan military officer and politician who served as a Member of Parliament for Soroti County in the Sixth Parliament of Uganda (1996–2001).

== Education ==
Omaria attended Teso College Aloet, where he became a prefect and later remained involved in the school's alumni activities and he later pursued a career in the Ugandan military and rose to the rank of colonel.

== Career ==
Omaria became involved in Uganda's political and military struggles during the period surrounding the overthrow of Idi Amin. He was associated with the Save Uganda Movement, one of the groups involved in the struggle against Amin's government. Following the overthrow of Amin in April 1979, Omaria became a member of the Uganda National Liberation Front Military Commission.

In 1980, he was on the Military Commission, which governed Uganda during the transitional period following the overthrow of Idi Amin. The commission oversaw the transition to civilian government and the December 1980 general election, which brought Milton Obote back to power.

In 1980, he entered electoral politics by contesting the Soroti County parliamentary seat against Ateker Ejalu, whom he defeated. In 1996, he returned to Parliament after again defeating Ejalu and represented Soroti County in the Sixth Parliament of Uganda (1996–2001). In the 2001 parliamentary election, Omaria contested the Soroti County seat again but lost his bid for re-election to the Seventh Parliament.

In 2002, Omaria contested for the position of chairperson of Soroti District and he received 12,252 votes thus finishing third in the contest. From there, he has been associated with Soroti Golf Club and served on its Board of Trustees.

== See also ==
- Yoweri Museveni
- Paulo Muwanga
- Tito Okello
- David Oyite-Ojok
