= Akena =

Akena is a given name and surname. Notable people with the name include:

- Akena p'Ojok (born c. 1980), Ugandan politician
- Chris Akena (born 2002), Ugandan footballer
- Jimmy Akena Obote (born 1967), Ugandan politician
