= 1972 revolt in Uganda =

1972 revolt in Uganda may refer to:

- 1972 rebel invasion of northern Uganda
- 1972 invasion of Uganda
- 1972 Uganda–Tanzanian border conflict
