= Nairobi Agreement, 1985 =

The Nairobi Agreement was a peace deal between the Ugandan government of Tito Okello and the National Resistance Army (NRA) rebel group led by Yoweri Museveni. The accords were signed in Nairobi, Kenya in December 1985.

== Background ==
On July 27, 1985, an army brigade of the Ugandan army (UNLA), commanded by Brigadier Bazilio Olara-Okello, staged a coup d'état against Milton Obote's government. The National Assembly was dissolved and a Military Council was established to rule the country, first with Olara Okello, and later General Tito Okello as Chairman. Meanwhile, Yoweri Museveni's NRA rebels were gaining ground, having taken advantage of the chaotic situation in the country, caused by power struggles within the government and a demoralized and disintegrating UNLA.

Tito Okello immediately and publicly invited all parties to the violence in Uganda to join in national reconciliation and nation building. All the major armed groups accepted this invitation, with the exception of the National Resistance Movement (NRM), the political wing of the National Resistance Army (NRA). President Julius Nyerere of Tanzania was approached by Tito Okello to facilitate a negotiated agreement between the NRM/A and the Military Council. Museveni and the NRM failed to turn up to the first round of talks in Dar es Salaam, as they were possibly suspicious of Nyerere's friendship with the ousted president, Milton Obote. Alternative arrangements were made for discussions presided over by a mutually acceptable Kenyan delegation headed by President Daniel arap Moi.

== Negotiations ==
The arduous negotiations continued from 26 August to 17 December and have been documented by the then Permanent Secretary in the Kenyan Ministry of Foreign Affairs, Bethuel Kiplagat. Museveni and the NRM/A were angry that the revolution for which they had fought for four years had been 'hijacked' by the UNLA, which they viewed as having been discredited by gross human rights violations during the second regime of Milton Obote, commonly referred to as 'Obote II'. The talks occasionally degenerated into slanging matches. Museveni denounced previous Ugandan regimes as "primitives" and "backward", initially refusing to negotiate with the "criminal" Military Council. Museveni and the NRM adopted a mercurial negotiating position, changing their demands and reintroducing supposedly resolved issues, leading Okello's team to accuse the NRM of prolonging the discussions unnecessarily. On one occasion, Museveni disappeared to Europe for three days, tabling new demands on his return. Both groups charged each other with maintaining links with soldiers loyal to the former president Idi Amin.

== Final agreement and breakdown ==
The final agreement, signed in Nairobi, called for a ceasefire, demilitarisation of Kampala, integration of the NRA and government forces, and absorption of the NRA leadership into the Military Council. These conditions were never met, however, and the ceasefire broke down almost immediately. Article 17(c) of the agreement called for the establishment of a commission of inquiry into human rights violations in Uganda since independence. This provided a clear disincentive for the UNLA to implement the peace plan, as it was likely that many of its leaders would be implicated in the abuses that had occurred during Obote II. The UNLA was also dismayed by article 7, which prescribed a national army numbering less than 8,500 troops with consequent unemployment for a large percentage of its 15,000 men.

The prospects of a lasting agreement were damaged further by the immediate context of the negotiations. The Kenyan team lacked an in depth knowledge of the situation in Uganda, the key personalities involved and their views, failing to build a meaningful relationship with the parties to the conflict. The negotiations excluded relevant Ugandan organisations, including the political parties. Several external actors, Libya, Burundi and Rwanda, had direct interests in the outcome of the talks, supporting one or several factions. The presence of these parties and possibly neutral international partners (such as the UN or OAU) may have prevented the failure of what cynics called the "Nairobi peace jokes".

Whether Museveni and the NRM/A were ever interested in a negotiated agreement is open to question. There was certainly no unequivocal commitment to such a settlement. Museveni and his allies refused to share power with generals they did not respect, not least while the NRA had the capacity to achieve an outright military victory. It is possible that the NRM/A merely used the four-month negotiations to present a positive image to the world and reorganise their forces.

== See also ==
- History of Uganda
- Politics of Uganda
- Political parties of Uganda
