= Teso College Aloet =

- Teso College Aloet Logo

Location
- Aloet; Uganda; 01°46′28.178″N 33°37′51.115″E

Information
- Type: Preparatory School
- Motto: AIJAANAKIN KA ARIMARIT (Service and Obedience)
- Established: 1953
- School district: Soroti District
- Faculty: 75
- Newspaper: The Pelican
- Website: www.tesocollegealoet.sc.ug

Teso College Aloet (TCA) was established in 1953. Teso College is an all-male preparatory school, a boarding school, located in Aloet, Soroti, in Uganda. As of 2014, Teso College has 1,574 students. Over 30,000 students have graduated from TCA since its establishment. Teso College ranks in the top 50 in the Ugandan national examinations performance listing.

Students at Teso College have access to a full array of co-curricular activities, including clubs and sports. Teso College's mission is to educate the future leaders of Uganda.

== History ==
Teso College was started in 1953 through the initiative of the local people from the Aloet area, with the support of Leo Okol, the Chairman of the Teso District Council at the time. The school didn't have a name at first, and consisted of only two junior classes. By 1954, under the leadership of the Teso District Local Administration, Teso College had grown into one of the largest and best equipped schools in Teso and Uganda.

On 9 July 1954, the foundation stone for the new school was laid by then colonial Governor of Uganda, Sir Andrew Cohen, marking the official founding of the school and giving it the name Teso College Aloet.

The preparations for enrolment and the formal start of teaching at Teso College were begun by A.S Baxendale, who was to later become Principal Education Officer, Eastern Province. In February 1955, John Sassoon, first acting Headmaster of the school, completed these preparations. Classes officially started on 1 March 1955, with James Opolot as the Assistant Master. On 2 March 1955, the Principal Judge of Teso District, E.P. Engulu, and the Secretary General of Teso, J.E.I. Ogaino, attended the first assembly held in Teso College, where Engulu presented the school with the gift of a drum. Towards the end of 1955, the first headmaster of the college Aloet, Jonny E. Jones, arrived from Sudan. From its foundation until 2012, 14 headmasters have led the college.

Teso College has taught the Christian religion from the beginning, and provides religious facilities to the students. Prior to the construction of the Anglican and Catholic chapels, the room next to the library was furnished as a chapel, and the Anglican Church of Uganda held Bible fellowships there. The art room was designated as the Catholic chapel, with services by a chaplain.

The school suffered some severe setbacks from 1986–2002, with the revolutions and unsettled political climate of Teso. The situation has steadily improved from 2005 onwards, with Teso College's performance in the Ugandan National Examinations getting better and better.

== Campus ==
Teso College is composed of two wings, the east wing and the west wing. Each wing contains classrooms, dormitories, and other necessary infrastructure. The main administrative offices are located in the east wing. This building houses offices for the Head Teacher, the Head Teacher's secretary, the deputy head teachers, and the school bursar. It also includes a small chapel and the staff room.

The Assembly Hall is adjacent to the administrative building. It serves multiple purposes, including Saturday morning assemblies, special conferences, meetings and debates. It is also used for entertainment purposes, such as film screenings. The Assembly Hall is also used for the purposes of holding National Exams at the end of the year.

The college has eight dormitories for Ordinary Level students (five in the east wing and three in the west wing); and one dormitory and two halls of residence for Advanced Level students. Each dormitory in the east wing has a sister dormitory with the same name in the west wing. The dormitories were named after influential personalities in the administration of Teso at the time, and other key African figures.

They include the following:

- Kenyatta House: Named in honour of Jomo Kenyatta, originally born Kamau Wa Ngengi, the first President of the Republic of Kenya.
- Lumumba House: Named after Patrice Émery Lumumba. Lumumba was a Congolese independence leader and the first legally elected Prime Minister of the Republic of Congo (now Democratic Republic of Congo) after he helped win its independence from Belgium in June 1960.
- Obwangor House: Named in honour of the then political boss of First Teso District, Cuthbert Joseph Obwangor, for his immense contribution to the development of Teso. Obwangor was the first Etesot to represent Teso district in Uganda's parliament. Obwangor House has a capacity of 128 students, and is closest to the dining hall. It has generally performed the best in sports and during inspections.
- Akabway House: Named for Akabway Stephen, who started out a Sub-County Chief and retired as County Chief of Katakwi County (present-day Katakwi district).
- Engulu House: Named after Engulu Eria Paulo, the first Principal Judge of Teso District, who also officiated in the first Assembly of Teso College Aloet.
- Engwau House: Named after Justice Engwau, who studied in Teso College between 1957 and 1960. Engwau had a First Class Law diploma from Nsamizi Law School. Upon completing his studies, he first worked as a teacher in Iganga C.O.U, then worked in Lira district. He joined the Judiciary as a Grade III Magistrate in 1964.
- Epaku House: Named for Epaku, who donated the land upon which the school is constructed.
- Esabu House: Named in memory of a County Chief in Teso district, Esabu Patrick, who was later elevated to the position of District Commissioner, Mubende district.

There is one dormitory and two halls of residence for ‘A’ Level students. These include Akabway House, Jones Hall and Inyoin Hall. The two adjoining halls are separated by a common area.

- Jones Hall: Named after the pioneer Headmaster of the school.
- Inyoin Hall: Named for Inyoin J. Onaba Kamodan, popularly known as J.O.K., who rose from being a classroom teacher of Ngora High School to become the first Treasurer of the Teso District Council. J.O.K was a man of transparent honesty, and advocated a corruption-free Teso district. This hall accommodates 120 ‘A’ Level students.
- Akabway House: Named for Akabway Stephen, who began his career as a Sub-county Chief and retired as County Chief of Katakwi County (present-day Katakwi district).

== Religious Life in Teso College ==
Teso College Aloet allows freedom of worship. The school has two churches—the Church of Uganda, located in the west wing, and the Catholic Church, located in the east wing.

== Teso College Farm ==
The school farm is engaged in the production of crops and livestock, as well as apiculture. The main objectives of the school farm are to provide practical training to students studying agriculture, to train the other students in farming skills, to produce food crops and animal products to supplement the students’ diet, to help the students understand the importance of agriculture, and to prepare the students to be self-reliant after leaving school.

The school farm raises and cares for chickens, cows, pigs, an orchard with over 300 orange trees covering 3 acres of land, approximately 12,000 pine trees which occupy about 12 acres of land, and 5 large Kenya Top Bar hives with bees.

== Teso College Staff ==
The college employs around 70 teachers and specialists who oversee the academic programs and 17 co-curricular clubs and activities.

The students' examination results are amongst the best in Uganda, and the college has a reputation for academic excellence in the north-eastern region. Approximately 25 non-teaching staff provide specialist assistance, working alongside teachers.

== Departments ==
English Department: English Language and Literature in English

The English language is the only language taught at TCA. As the school's only official language, as well as its language of instruction, English plays a pivotal role in learning other subjects in the curriculum. Literature in English is taught alongside the English language from Senior One. Studying literature in English helps to improve the student's performance in the language because it exposes him to appropriate language in different contexts and to a number of language resources and ingredients.

Mathematics Department

Every year 60 students participate in the National Mathematics contest organized by the Uganda Mathematical Society. A good number of them feature in the top positions nationwide. Teamwork is exhibited among the members of the department and this has resulted in continued improvement in the performance of students both at ‘O’ and ‘A’ Levels.

Physics Department

The Physics Department is run by all the teachers in the department, spearheaded by the Head of Department The formation of Physics Club that has helped to boost academic performance, leading to continued improvement of results at UCE and UACE UNEB Examinations.

Agriculture Department

The school farm has greatly been improved, both for commercial and teaching purposes. There are poultry and piggery components in the farm. It used to have local cattle, but those have been sold and replaced with exotic breeds. Performance in Agriculture at National examinations has kept improving over the past years.

Commerce Department

Commerce is one of the business subjects taught in the college. It was formerly taught for three years starting with Senior Two, but currently it is taught for four years starting with Senior One. Commerce is taught by permanent teachers and others who are on the government payroll. The department's performance has improved over the past years.

Christian Religious Education Department

The subject is offered at both ‘O’ and ‘A’ Levels. It is one of the optional subjects taken by a majority of students at ‘O’ Level, with 75% of the semi- and candidate classes doing it. It is one of the most popular subjects at the ‘A’ Level Arts department. The performance has been good for the last ten years, with a majority of students scoring distinctions and credits at ‘O’ Level and principal passes at ‘A’ Level.

Biology Department

Biology is one of the compulsory science subjects.

Technical Drawing Department

This department can be described as going from inconspicuous to prominent during its recent history, from 4 students in 2006 to an average of 60 students presently enrolled,. With the decision to eliminate woodwork as a subject in 2007, Technical Drawing has remained the flagship subject for the department.

History Department

History is one of the 7 core subjects taught at ‘O’ Level, and it is a popular arts subject at ‘A’ Level.

Geography Department

Geography is a compulsory subject at ‘O’ Level and optional at ‘A’ Level.

Fine Art Department

The Department of Fine Art is unique in the region because the students are exposed to various materials and tools which are purchased by the school every term. The students are taught how to draw using different media, such as poster paint, watercolours and powders.

Entrepreneurship Education Department

Entrepreneurship Education is a new innovation in educational reform instituted by the Ministry of Education and Sports. It is aimed at creating job makers rather than the job seekers that have been prevalent up until now. The objective is to instil business skills among the students. As a department, we impart business skills, so that by the end of their formal education, students should be able to start their own income-generating businesses, and eventually sustain and maintain them.

Information and Communications Technology (ICT) Department

This department was originally set up as a project under the PTA. ICT went on to become one of the subjects in the school. Gradually more students grew interested in the subject, and it was decided that those interested should get registered for the Uganda National Examinations (UNEB). The department has become so busy that the entire students’ population is now being taught ICT skills.

Chemistry Department

Chemistry is one of the subjects offered from S.1 – S.6 in Teso College Aloet and in many other schools in the country.

Physical Education Department

This subject was introduced to the college and the whole country in 2010. Initially it was supposed to be taught in S.1 and rolled over to S.2 in 2011, but it was initiated from S.1 to S.3 that same year. In 2004, the government of Uganda approved the national Physical Education and Sports Policy (NPESP).

In 2008, the Ministry of Education and Sports directed that the teaching of Physical Education (PE) as a core subject be mandatory in all secondary schools

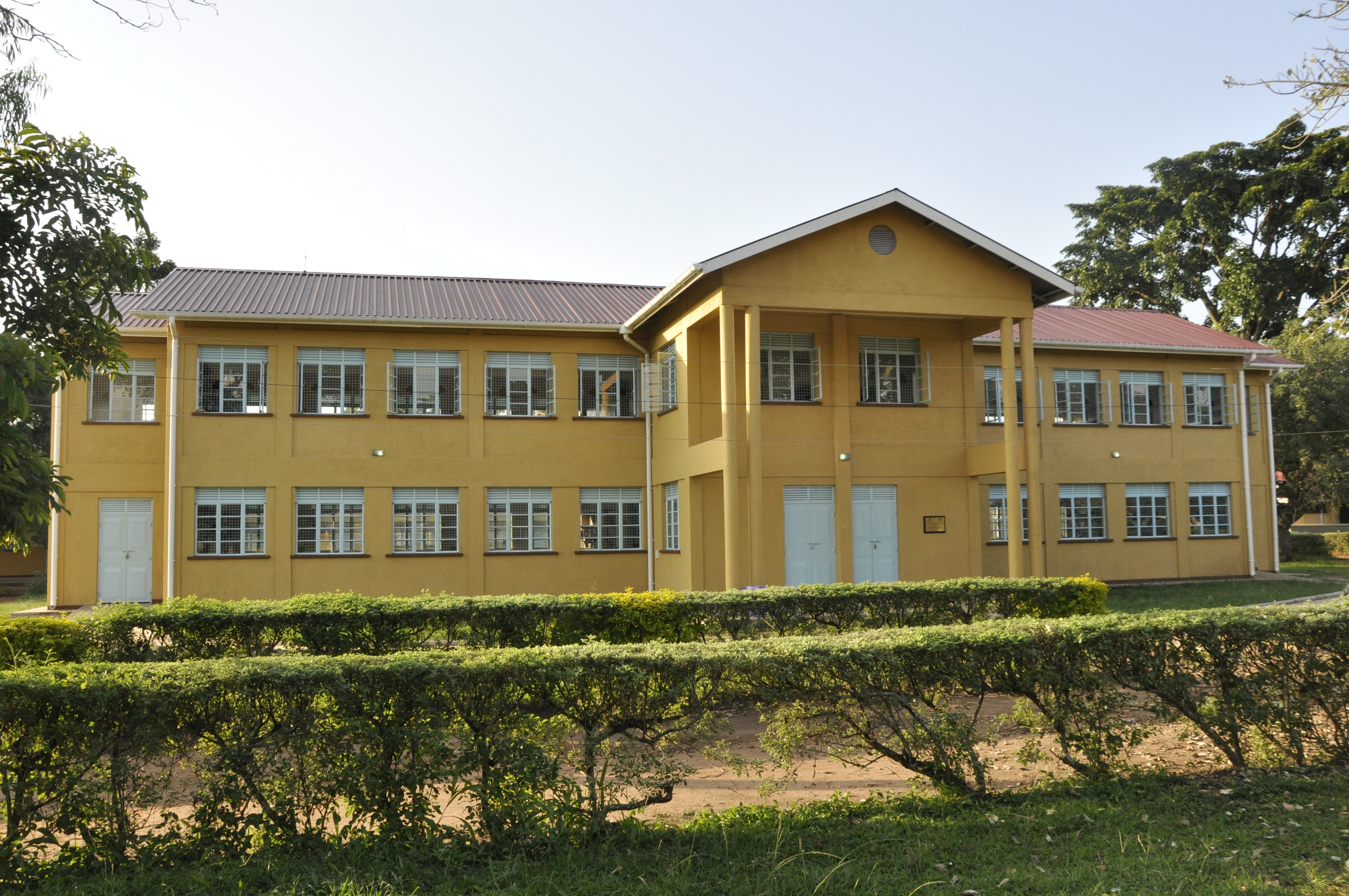
2014 TCA East Wing Library

In 2012, the Ministry of Education and Sports established 32 schools in the whole country as Sports Schools. Teso College Aloet happens to be one of the selected schools. Sports schools will provide a perfect environment wherein identified sports talents can be nurtured while the students continue with their studies.

The basic curriculum for Sports Schools consists of eight core components and seven optional Sports disciplines, one being selected for each school. The core components of the curriculum are: advanced basic gymnastics, football, volleyball, basketball, rugby, athletics, table tennis, and mental games, such as chess, Scrabble, Draft, and mweso board game. There are also optional sports, such as netball, grass hockey, handball, cricket, lawn tennis, badminton, swimming, and baseball (selected for the college) and softball.

Teso College is fortunate to have enough land for construction of facilities. At the moment it has the following facilities: seven football fields (five of which are operational), two volleyball courts, three basketball courts, one baseball area (the diamond is not yet constructed), two tables for table tennis, one rugby pitch, one athletics field, and some mental games (Scrabble).

Economics Department

Economics is a subject offered at ‘A’ level. Students who have passed Mathematics, Commerce, Accounting, Entrepreneurship Education, and Agriculture at ‘O’ Level are allowed to pursue Economics at the ‘A’ Level.

General Paper Department

The Head of the General Paper (GP) Department coordinates with other faculty members in handling topics which fall in their areas of expertise. For example, the topic on the role of ICT in development is handled by ICT department teaching staff.

== Library ==
Teso College has a fully equipped library, providing a wide range of materials to meet the study requirements for classes. There is at least one librarian on duty, ensuring that recommended books are available, that students know how to use them, and that they are kept informed of the latest developments.

== Student Leadership ==
Teso College operates a prefect system. The Head Prefect leads his fellow prefects in their duties, leads the student Council, and represents the student voice and the school at a variety of events. Prefects and Councillors play an important role at the college. They act as ambassadors and diplomats for the school. All prefects help supervise younger students and provide an additional pair of eyes for the teachers. They are also expected to be guardians and role models, exhibiting adherence to school policies and rules, while challenging disciplinary issues with dignity and respect.

== Extracurricular Activities ==
Various forms of entertainment and extracurricular activities exist in the college.

Films: The school screens films every term for students. The types of films screened in the school include educational, documentary, action, and comedy.

Debating club: Debates are organized every term. The debate competitions are conducted between classes. Debates are intended to help the students who take part to learn and master the art of public speaking, improve their English language skills and promote research and literature review on the topics of the debate.

Music: In the music component, students learn how to sing. The students who participate in music are most often born-again and learn gospel music.

Sports: Teso College offers various forms of sports. These include: track and field sports, football, handball and volleyball.

Physics club: The formation of Physics Club has led to continued improvement of results at UCE and UACE UNEB Examinations.

== Sports and Athletics ==
Sports disciplines such as football, volleyball and basketball have gained prominence in the school. Over the years, Teso College has deepened its involvement in football and volleyball competitions at district and zone levels.

PE is a compulsory subject, which is an integral part of the student's education. The school has extensive sport and recreation facilities, including a large ground at West Wing, which has a football pitch and a volleyball court. The school's larger sports ground at East Wing include pitches for football, volleyball, handball, and rugby, as well as a basketball court.

The main sports ground overlooks the head teacher's residence, and has badminton and tennis courts.

== Clubs and Societies ==
Current Affairs/Writers Club

After a long hiatus, the Writer's Club resumed meeting in 2006 with 10 members. In 2011, the club produced the first issue of the school magazine, the Pelican, since the last magazine of the 1960s. In 2012, the second edition of the Pelican was produced. In 2013, the club registered about 35 members.

The club publishes the Pelican annually, and conducts “cartoon networking”—drawing cartoons disseminating relevant information concerning the school and students, which are posted on the notice boards every week. The Current Affairs/Writers Club also gathers news that is “broadcast” during General Assembly, conducted every Monday, and trains other students on news writing and editing.

Cyber Science Club

The Cyber Science Club serves the ‘O’ Level students. Using computers supplied by Cyber School Technology Solutions Uganda, in collaboration with the Ministry of Education and Sports, students are able to learn new technology.

Scripture Union

The club has more than 400 members and 40 executives, who fulfil the objectives of the National Branch, Scripture Union Uganda.

Mathematics Club

Re-established in 2011, this club serves Mathematics students and other students with a particular interest in the subject at both ‘O’ and ‘A’ Levels. The overall aim of the club is to enable students to perform excellently in Mathematics and to provide applicable logical solutions to some real-life situations.

Red Cross

The Red Cross club is run on the seven fundamental principles of HINIVUU: Humanity, Impartiality, Neutrality, Independence, Volunteerism, Unity and Universality. Red Cross volunteers have training in life skills, project management and first aid. With this basic knowledge, they participate in administering basic first aid during sports days at school, district athletics and so on.

Scouting

The Scouting Club is a voluntary, non-political and educational youth movement. It is open to all, without discrimination, regardless of ethnicity and creed, in accordance with the purpose, principles and methods defined by Lord Baden Powell, and his wife, Mrs. Olivier of Gilwell. The Scouts' mission is to educate young people to play a constructive role in society. Scouts are taught to live by a code of conduct exemplified in the 12 points of the Scout Law, and they continue to live by these laws in adulthood. A central part of a Scout's code of conduct is honesty.

Young Catholic Students (YCS) Club

YCS was originally called Young Christian Students and was later changed to the Young Catholic Students Club, with the membership is restricted to Catholics. This was a recent undertaking by the World Council. YCS was started in the 19th century by a Belgian Priest known as Fr Joseph C. as a way of restoring hope and courage to the youth in Europe. The main objective of the movement is to make the students’ world a better and happier place to live in, both spiritually and materially.

Straight Talk Club HIV-AIDS/WSWM/PIASY

With a membership of the about 25% of the student population, PIASY TCA educates and raises awareness on HIV-AIDS issues. They do so by holding assembly talks on HIV and AIDS, hosting school club meetings, organizing a PIASY drama competition, holding in-class talks about HIV and AIDS, developing awareness messages in school, providing guidance and counselling and visiting other schools and TASO Soroti.

Patriotism Club

The club is formed based on government policy and the school administration implements it. Membership in the Patriotism club is compulsory for every student upon payment of membership fees. So far 1,600 students have enrolled.

Cultural Affairs Club

The Cultural Affairs club was established on 3 May 2012 after the Iteso students came to realize that their cultural heritage, especially language, customs, norms, values and beliefs, were being eroded. The students consulted widely and decided to form a Cultural Affairs club called Iteso Cultural Union (ICU). The club is recognized by His Highness Papa Emorimor of the mainstream ICU.

The ICU aims to appeal to young students in the Teso sub-region by raising awareness of the need for peaceful coexistence among people from diverse ethnic, racial and cultural backgrounds, through mentorship and discussion of cross-cutting issues and shared cultural values.

== Notable alumni ==
- William Omaria Lo Arapai, military officer and politician
- Musa Ecweru, accountant and politician
- Charles Engola, politician
- Andrew Mukooza, military officer
- Wafula Oguttu, journalist and politician

== See also ==
- Soroti
