= Robert Serumaga =

Ugandan Playwright

Robert Bellarmino Serumaga (1939 – September 1980) was a Ugandan playwright. He was also an important political figure in Uganda during the late 1970s, being the leader and co-founder of the Uganda Nationalist Organization militant group and Minister of Commerce in the government of President Yusuf Lule.

== Life ==
Born to a Roman Catholic family in Buganda, Serumaga was raised by his mother, Geraldine Namotovu. He won scholarships to study at St Mary's College, Kisubi and St Henry's College, Kitovu. He studied economics at Trinity College, Dublin, where he encountered Irish theatre and the Theatre of the Absurd. He returned to Uganda in 1966 or 1967. Initially employed as a government economist, he soon moved towards the theatre. He founded the National Theatre Company in 1967, writing A Play (1967), The Elephants (1970) and Majangwa (1971) for it. These plays were all influenced by absurdism, the lack of narrative action mirroring the stagnation of Ugandan society under Milton Obote.

In 1971, the year Idi Amin came to power, Serumaga founded a private theatre group made up of fourteen school leavers. Initially known as Theatre Limited, the group was later renamed the Abafumi ("Storyteller") Theatre Company. Serumaga drew on the theories of Constantin Stanislavski and Jerzy Grotowski to train his company in the psychological identification of actor and character. More fundamentally, he created a new dramatic form for Abafumi. By means of an abstract drama of physical movement and dance, political criticism of Amin could be enacted without censorship:

He developed modes of drama - based mostly on ritual and mime - that could represent the climate of violence and death that dominated this period without drawing the unwanted attention of the ruthless military class.

Amayrikitti was even performed at Amin's invitation at the 1974 Organization of African Unity Meeting in Kampala, with Amin describing it approvingly as "gymnastics".

Becoming disillusioned with Amin, Serumaga left Uganda in 1977. In exile in the late 1970s, he became a major figure among the Ugandan opposition. At the time, he became well known as a monarchist, supporting Mutesa II, the deposed Kabaka of Buganda. He became involved in militant opposition groups such as the Save Uganda Movement, and co-founded the Uganda Nationalist Organization (UNO) in 1978. In late 1978, the Uganda–Tanzania War, whereupon Serumaga helped to organize armed UNO fighters to assist the Tanzanians against Amin's regime. He trained as fighter at the Tarime rebel camp. However, two rebel raids into Uganda which Serumaga helped to organize ended in complete failure. Regardless, there were discussions among the opposition in March 1979 which included Serumaga as one of those who could be appointed as president once Amin was removed. Serumaga was ultimately part of the pro-Tanzanian Uganda National Liberation Army that helped to oust Amin in April 1979.

As supporter of newly installed Ugandan President Yusuf Lule, Serumaga initially served as assistant minister before being appointed Minister of Commerce. However, Lule's government was short-lived. When Lule was removed from office amid general political turmoil and replaced by Godfrey Binaisa, Serumaga went back into exile and announced the reactivation of the Uganda Nationalist Organization. He was alleged to have seized a "missing arms depot", and journalist Victoria Brittain judged at the time that Serumaga's group could "cause difficulties in Uganda". However, Serumaga died in mysterious circumstances in Nairobi in 1980, reportedly of a brain haemorrhage. The Serumaga Organization, a non-profit organization run by Serumaga's daughter, is named in his memory.

== Works ==
=== Plays ===
- A Play (produced 1967)
- The Elephants (produced 1970). Published as The Elephants, Nairobi: Oxford University Press, 1971.
- Majangwa (produced 1971). Published as Majangwa: A Promise of Rains and a Play, Nairobi, East African Publishing House, 1974.
- Renga Moi (produced 1972)
- Amayirikitti (produced 1974)

=== Novels ===
- Return to the Shadows, London: Heinemann, 1969. African Writers Series No. 54. New York: Atheneum, 1970.
