= Akena p'Ojok =

Ugandan politician

Minister of Power, Posts and Telecommunications
- Milton Obote's government deposed
- In office 1980–1985

Member of Parliament
- In office 1980–?

Vice Chairman of UNLA's Military Coalition
- In office 1979–1979

Personal details
- Born: c. 1931 (age 94–95) Pupwonya, Amuru District, Uganda
- Party: Uganda Patriotic Movement (after 1980); Uganda National Liberation Front (1979)
- Education: Nairobi University

Akena p'Ojok is a former influential Ugandan politician who held various government positions in the 1980s, including Minister of Power, Posts and Telecommunications. He was a prominent figure of Uganda National Liberation Front/Army that helped remove Idi Amin and was involved in the power struggles that followed.

== Early life ==
P'Ojok, an ethnic Acholi, was born in Pupwonya, a rural community near Atiak trading centre in Kilak County, Amuru District.

== Political life ==
During the rule of Idi Amin, p'Ojok fled to Kenya, settling in Nairobi, where he became the chief engineer of the Kenyan Electricity Utility company. Together with Yonna Kanyomozi, Ephraim Kamuntu, Richard Kaijuka and other prominent Ugandans living in exile, p'Ojok founded the Save Uganda Movement (SUM), an anti-Idi Amin militant organization that subsequently united under the banner of Uganda National Liberation Front (UNLF) with groups having a similar aim who, together with Tanzanian armed forces, removed Idi Amin in 1979.

During the Uganda-Tanzania War, p'Ojok was the Vice Chairman of the military coalition that was composed to form the Uganda National Liberation Army (UNLA, the military faction of UNLF) and Tanzania People's Defence Force, which resulted in Amin's overthrow. He later became the Vice President of UNLF, which de facto ruled Uganda immediately after Idi Amin. Akena p'Ojok was chosen to become the President of Uganda after Yusuf Lule (who was president after Idi Amin). However, following The Moshi Conference, Godfrey Binaisa was appointed president instead.

When political parties were being formed in preparation for the 1980 General Elections, p'Ojok vied for leadership of Uganda Patriotic Movement (UPM), but Yoweri Museveni was instead chosen for the post. Akena p'Ojok then joined Uganda People's Congress (UPC), and became Member of Parliament for Gulu West Constituency, having beaten his main competitor, Anthony Ochaya of the Democratic Party. Uganda People's Congress won the elections (which were largely believed to have been rigged). Akena p'Ojok became the Minister of Power Posts and Telecommunications, and later held various positions as Cabinet Minister in the government of UPC's Milton Obote.

In 1985, Obote's government was deposed in a coup led by Tito Okello and Bazilio Olara-Okello. In 1986, in the aftermath of the chaos which followed the coup, Yoweri Museveni's National Resistance Army, which had been fighting against Obote's government for six years, seized power. P'jok declined several personal offers from Museveni to join his government and in 1987 was arrested and charged with treason for allegedly amassing weapons to overthrow the government. There is no record of his being found guilty of the charges, but he was sent to prison. In 1990 he was released by presidential pardon of Museveni, after which he left Uganda and settled in the United Kingdom.

In early 2005 a congregation of Acholi elders approached p'Ojok and asked him to represent the Acholi in Uganda People's Congress, an offer which he declined.

Since the 1990s, p'Ojok has lived with his wife and children on the outskirts of London.
