= Uganda National Liberation Front =

Armed group of exiled Ugandans in the Uganda-Tanzania War (1978-79)

- Leaders: Milton Obote; Yoweri Museveni; Akena p'Ojok; John Barigye
- Dates active: 1979
- Groups: Kikosi Maalum; FRONASA; SUM; UNO
- Headquarters: Moshi, Tanzania
- Ideology: Anti-Idi Amin
- Part of: Uganda National Liberation Army
- Wars: Uganda–Tanzania War; Ugandan Bush War

The Uganda National Liberation Front (UNLF) was a political group formed by exiled Ugandans opposed to the rule of military dictator Idi Amin. The UNLF had an accompanying military wing, the Uganda National Liberation Army (UNLA). UNLA fought alongside Tanzanian forces in the Uganda–Tanzania War that led to the overthrow of Amin's regime. The group ruled Uganda from the overthrow of Amin in April 1979 until the disputed national elections in December 1980.

== Creation ==
The UNLF was formed as an outcome of a meeting of Ugandan exiles from 24 to 26 March 1979 in the northern Tanzanian town of Moshi. In the meeting, known as the Moshi Conference, 28 groups were represented. The most important groups that united to form UNLA included Kikosi Maalum led by Milton Obote (with Tito Okello and David Oyite Ojok as commanders); FRONASA led by Yoweri Museveni; and the Save Uganda Movement.

Unit	Leader(s)	Base(s)
Obote's faction (Uganda People's Congress, Kikosi Maalum)	Milton Obote	Tanzania, Kenya, Zambia, United Kingdom
FRONASA	Yoweri Museveni	Tanzania
Save Uganda Movement	Akena p'Ojok, William Omaria, Ateker Ejalu	Tanzania, Uganda
Uganda Liberation Group (Z)	Immanuel Oteng; Milton Obote (de facto)	Zambia
Uganda National Movement	John Barigye, Crown Prince of Ankole	Zambia
Uganda Human Right Group	George Kanyeihamba	United Kingdom
Uganda Action Group	Paulo Muwanga	United Kingdom
Popular Front for the Liberation of Uganda	John Odongkara	United States
Uganda Freedom Union	Godfrey Binaisa (?)	United States
Relief Educational Training Uganda Refugees Now (RETURN)	Festo Kivengere	United States
Uganda National Unity and Reconciliation	Eric Otema Alimadi	Tanzania
Uganda Society	Yusuf Lule, Martin Aliker	Kenya
Uganda Discussion Group	Tarsis Kabwegyere (?)	Kenya
Uganda Nationalist Organization	Robert Serumaga	Kenya
Uganda Liberation Movement	Dani Wadada Nabudere (?)	Kenya
Nairobi Consultative Committee	Tarsis Kabwegyere, D.W. Nabudere	Kenya
Negotiating Committee for Democratic Unity	Dani Wadada Nabudere (?)	Tanzania
Moshi Discussion Group	?	Tanzania
Ad Hoc Committee for Promotion of Unity	Yash Tandon, Mahmood Mamdani (?)	Tanzania
Muthaiga Discussion Group	Aliker (?)	Kenya

== Governance ==
The UNLF was governed by an 11-member Executive Council originally chaired by Yusuf Lule who was the Uganda President at that time, with the vice-chairman being Akena P' Ojok, who was Uganda's then vice president. The UNLF was accompanied by a National Consultative Council (NCC) with one member for each of the 28 groups represented at the meeting. Its military arm, UNLA, fought side by side with the Tanzania People's Defence Force (TPDF) in the Uganda-Tanzania War and invaded Uganda, taking Kampala in April 1979 and sending Amin to exile. There were other party members of UNLF across the country and in the regions formed to coordinate the activities of UNLF.<

== Overthrowing of Idi Amin ==
Following the overthrow of Amin on 11 April 1979, a new UNLF government was formed under Yusuf Lule with the UNLA becoming the new national army. The leadership of the UNLF was unstable, with infighting leading to the ousting of Lule in June 1979. His replacement, Godfrey Binaisa, ruled for less than twelve months before being placed under house arrest in May 1980 following an effective coup by Paulo Muwanga. A Presidential Commission was installed with elections planned for December 1980. The exiles who formed the UNLF needed to put aside their political differences to do so. They were only united by one thing: an opposition to Amin. For this reason, the UNLF did not contest the elections with its members supporting various parties.

Following a widely disputed victory for the Uganda People's Congress (UPC) led by former president Milton Obote, many of the UNLF founding members would go on to fight against the now UPC-controlled UNLA. The UNLA was defeated on January 25, 1986 by the guerrillas of the National Resistance Army (NRA) led by Yoweri Museveni, a former member of the UNLF executive council and a minister in the UNLF government. There was a tribal conflict between the Acholi and Langi, that led to the coup d'état making Tito Okello Lutwa president of the republic.
