= Chris Akena =

Ugandan footballer (born 2002)

Personal information
- Full name: Chris Pius Akena
- Date of birth: 18 August 2002 (age 24)
- Place of birth: Kampala, Uganda
- Positions: Attacking midfielder; right winger; left midfielder; left wing back

Team information
- Current team: Zamora CF B

Youth career
- 2008–2015: Pro way Soccer Academy
- 2016: Aspire Academy
- 2017: Maroons
- 2020–2022: Shabab Al Ahli

Senior career*
Years	Team	Apps	(Gls)
2018–2020	Maroons		
2022-2023	Al Rams		
2023–2024	M.A Agias Marinas	22	(11)
2024	Apollon Pontus	9	(2)
2024-2026	Gor Mahia		
2026	UD Las Zocas		
2026-2027	Zamora CF B		

International career^{‡}
2022–	Uganda	2	(0)
- * Club domestic league appearances and goals as of 31 March 2023 ‡ National team caps and goals as of 31 March 2023

Chris Pius Akena (born 18 August 2002) is a Ugandan professional footballer who is known for his versatility playing as an attacking midfielder, right winger, left midfielder and left wing back for Spanish club Zamora CF B and the Uganda national team.

== Club career ==
Akena started his youth career at Proway Sports Academy in Uganda before joining Aspire Academy in Qatar in 2016. In 2017, he joined Uganda Premier League side Maroons and in 2021 he signed for Shabab Al Ahli Club where he won with the U21 and U19 the UAE U21 pro league and the UAE youth league titles before joining the UAE second-tier club Al Rams Club in January 2023 becoming the first Ugandan to ever play professional football in UAE.

He later progressed to playing in Europe signing a one year's contract with a Greek third-tier club Megas Alexandros Agias Marinas for the season 2023/24 then later he joined Apollon Pontus on 31 January, a historical club in Super League Greece 2 for the rest of the season 2023–24.

In July 2024 Akena Chris joined the 21 times Kenyan Premier League record champions Gor Mahia on a two years contract.. He later joined Spanish club UD Las Zocas in the South of Tenerife that has a record of competing in Spanish third tier league for 19 consecutive seasons. He later signed with Spanish historic club Zamora CF B where he currently plays.

== International career ==
In December 2021, Akena earned his maiden call-up to the Uganda national football team which was set to play two international build-up matches against Gabon and Mauritania. However, he made his debut on 21 January 2022 against Iraq national football team at Al Shohada International Stadium in Baghdad city.

== International statistics ==
Uganda
Year	Apps	Goals
2022	2	0
Total	2	0

Statistics accurate as of match played 31 March 2023
