= David Oyite-Ojok =

Ugandan military commander (1940–1983)

- Oyite-Ojok in 1981
- Born: 15 April 1940; Lira District, Protectorate of Uganda
- Died: 1 December 1983 (aged 43); Nakitoma Sub-county, Nakasongola District
- Military career
- Allegiance: Uganda (1963–1971); Ugandan rebels loyal to Milton Obote (1971–1979); Uganda (Obote government; from 1979)
- Branch: Uganda Army (1963–1971); Kikosi Maalum (1971–1979); UNLA (from 1979)
- Service years: 1963–1983
- Rank: Major general
- Nicknames: Lion of Uganda; Lion of War
- Conflicts: 1972 invasion of Uganda; Uganda–Tanzania War: Battle of Lukaya; Fall of Kampala; Battle of Lira; Ugandan Bush War

David Oyite Ojok (15 April 1940 – 2 December 1983) was a Ugandan military officer who held a leadership position in the coalition of Uganda National Liberation Army and Tanzania People's Defence Force which removed military dictator Idi Amin in 1979 and, until his death in a helicopter crash, served as the national army chief of staff with the rank of major general.

== Military career before 1979 ==
An ethnic Lango, Oyite Ojok was born in Lira District on 15 April 1940. Although there are few documented details regarding David Oyite Ojok's early years, he was initially noted in his late twenties as a junior army officer serving during the 1966–71 period of President Milton Obote's first government.

Oyite-Ojok joined the Uganda Army in 1963. By 1965, he was teaching a training course for officer cadets in Jinja. He was transferred from 1st Battalion to 4th Battalion on 7 February 1966 at Shaban Opolot's orders. However at the end of February 1966 he was transferred to Army Headquarters and made Deputy Assistant Adjutant and Quartermaster General. In September 1970, while Idi Amin was out of the country serving as the Ugandan representative at the funeral of President Nasser of Egypt, Obote appointed a new Chief of Defence Staff (Brigadier Suleman Hussein). Oyite-Ojok was one of President Obote's most important followers in the military, and was described by Omara-Otunnu as 'Obote's principal military confidant' was appointed to the '..newly created post of Assistant Military Secretary in the Ministry of Defence,' serving as a Major. His duties included '..planning, all policy matters, and control of Establishment.' At some point, he was sent for training to Great Britain.

It is not just a victory for us alone, but for the rest of Uganda. With our blood, we have served notice on other oppressive dictatorships in Africa that there comes a time when African people will rise and fight for their right to liberty.

— Oyite-Ojok on the overthrow of Amin, 1979

By 1971, Oyite-Ojok served as lieutenant colonel, but was forced to flee his home country when Idi Amin overthrew Obote in a coup. Relocating to Tanzania, Oyite-Ojok joined the guerrilla army Obote was organizing to regain power. While operating in exile, Oyite-Ojok gradually gained a "legendary" reputation in Uganda. Rumours circulated about him sneaking into the Ugandan capital where he would party with locals at popular nightspots and ask that the bills be sent to President Amin. The latter allegedly responded by putting a $70,000 bounty on Oyite-Ojok's head. In 1972, Oyite-Ojok took part in a rebel invasion of Uganda which aimed at restoring Obote to presidency. Striking from their exile in Tanzania, the rebels attacked in two columns, with Oyite-Ojok reportedly leading the group targeting Masaka. However, the operation resulted in a major rebel defeat. After this failure, Obote reorganized his remaining forces; he mobilized a "navy" of six boats on Lake Victoria which would conduct smuggling operations to finance the rebels as well as set up an underground network in Uganda. Oyite-Ojok was entrusted with command of Obote's "navy".

The Uganda Army invaded Tanzania in late 1978, resulting in the Uganda–Tanzania War's outbreak. Oyite-Ojok assumed a key role in the grouping of military exiles who, with the backing of Tanzanian troops, led the counteroffensive which resulted in the overthrow of Amin. At first, he served as field commander for Obote's private army Kikosi Maalum, and was appointed head of a Uganda National Liberation Army (UNLA) battalion in March 1979. With the latter unit, he fought alongside the Tanzanians in central and eastern Uganda. Oyite-Ojok proved to be tactically adept during this conflict. He eventually rose to chief of staff for the entire UNLA.

Oyite-Ojok's reputation grew immensely during the Uganda–Tanzania War. Some people, including Tito Okello, attributed the Tanzanian victories in the Battle of Lukaya and the Fall of Kampala to his leadership.

== Transition period ==
Oyite Ojok became a member, along with Yoweri Museveni, Paulo Muwanga and Tito Okello, of the Military Commission, a powerful sub-committee of the Uganda National Liberation Front (UNLF) which ruled the country after Idi Amin's overthrow. Like most people in power after the fall of Amin, Oyite-Ojok illegally amassed a great amount of wealth. One of his most successful business ventures was coffee export, and he became chairman of the Coffee Making Board. He remained loyal to Obote who was preparing to return from exile. The alliance of political forces in the UNLF under President Yusuf Lule soon began to unravel. Of significant importance was the emergence of tribal rivalry. On the one side were those from the North who made up the bulk of the new national army, and on the other those from the South (particularly those from the Buganda tribe) who for the first time since 1964 had significant political and military influence.

As chief of staff of the UNLA in its new role as Uganda's national army, Oyite Ojok was supposed to stay neutral and above the political disputes. Instead of doing so, Oyite Ojok fully backed Obote. He ensured that the national army under his command was overwhelmingly made up of Northerners, such as himself. The political symbol for most of those from Northern Uganda was the Uganda Peoples Congress party and Obote, who was still in Tanzanian exile. Obote's possible return was opposed by many within the UNLF, particularly those from Buganda who recalled that it was Obote who had dethroned their King (the Kabaka of Buganda) and forced him into exile in 1966. It is widely believed that it was this opposition to Obote's return and the growing influence of the northern dominated army that led to the removal of Yusuf Lule from the Presidency after only 2 months in office. Lule had also tried to extend his very limited presidential powers in the UNLF.

Lule was replaced by another Muganda, Godfrey Binaisa who was seen as more of a figurehead. Real power now lay with Oyite Ojok and the Military Commission. The UNLF became more militaristic in appearance as army officers like Ojok became actively involved in politics, and the quasi-legislative National Commission and government ministers became less significant. On the ground the army became more brutal, particularly in Buganda and other areas of Southern Uganda. Most significantly, the Uganda Peoples Congress with its military allies began to actively organise and call for the return of Obote.

In May 1980, Oyite Ojok gained greater power when "figurehead president" Binaisa dismissed him as army chief in an attempt to reduce the power of the Military Commission. In response the Military Commission removed Binaisa from office and declared the country would be ruled by a Presidential Commission which included Muwanga, Museveni, Oyite Ojok and Okello. Although as chairman, Muwanga presented the face of the Commission, real power was held by Oyite Ojok. Meanwhile, Oyite-Ojok also organized his personal death squad led by his trusted follower Captain Patrick Ageta. This 30-strong squad roamed Kampala in two jeeps, and murdered several political opponents of the chief of staff.

== Return of Milton Obote ==
The Presidential Commission now paved the way for the return of Obote and organised what a general election in December 1980. Oyite-Ojok campaigned on behalf of Obote, using his status as "legendary commander" to rally northerners to his cause. Firmly rooted in tribalist ideas, the officer believed that the elections would decide which ethnic group controlled Uganda's wealth. Researcher Opiyo Oloya argued that this "was the game as [Oyite-Ojok] saw and played it". Despite being an ethnic Lango, Oyite Ojok managed to gain the support of many traditionally marginalised Acholi people. The 1980 elections resulted in "victory" for Obote's Uganda Peoples Congress and Obote became president for the second time, confirming Oyite-Ojok as Army Chief of Staff. Museveni, who had formed a rival political party, the Uganda Patriotic Front, disputed the result and started a guerrilla war against the government.

As Army Chief of Staff, Oyite-Ojok was responsible for attempting to defeat the guerrilla armies of Museveni's National Resistance Movement (NRA) and Andrew Kayiira's Uganda Freedom Movement (UFM) which were fighting to overthrow Obote's government. With his military experience during the struggle to overthrow Idi Amin, Oyite Ojok proved very effective against these groups. However this was done with both military tact and brutality against the population in areas where the guerrilla forces operated. This was most prevalent in the Luwero District where the NRA was active and in the capital city, Kampala where the UFM was based. In Luwero, thousands of civilians were killed by the army – especially in an area called the 'Luwero Triangle'. In Kampala, the army and secret police carried out numerous random arrests which often involved arresting hundreds of people and loading them onto trucks which were then driven to army barracks. This phenomenon was called "Panda Gari" ("Climb the Truck") and it instilled widespread fear in the capital as many of those taken to army barracks were beaten or killed.

By 1983, the UNLA under Oyite-Ojok had effectively defeated the NRA and UFM. However, tensions increasingly emerged in the military, as a rivalry developed between the two northern tribes that dominated the army -the Langi (Obote and Oyite Ojok's tribe) and the Acholi (Tito Okello – the Army Commander's tribe). The majority of the army foot soldiers were Acholi and it was they who suffered most casualties in the war, and it is rumoured that they wanted to engage in peace talks with the guerrillas. Meanwhile, the elite Special Forces and most of the officers closest to Obote were Langi – and were fiercely opposed to any negotiations with the NRA. A rift also emerged between Oyite-Ojok and Obote, as the former seized properties of the Coffee Marketing Board and began to amass a fortune by smuggling coffee out of Uganda. At one point, the army commander and President engaged in a fierce dispute over this issue, with Oyite-Ojok reportedly telling his superior that "it was because of him and the army that he (Obote) was still in power".

On 2 December 1983, Oyite-Ojok died in a helicopter crash in Nakitoma Sub-county, part of Nakasongola District. The NRA claimed that it had shot down his Bell 412, whereas Obote's government claimed that the crash had been the result of a technical failure. Soon, conspiracy theories emerged, alleging that Obote had arranged the death of his army commander as the latter had grown too powerful.

== Aftermath ==
In the decades following the helicopter crash which ended David Oyite Ojok's life at the age of 43, documented details have not been made public. The political ramifications for Uganda, however, were severe. Acholi officers now expected Obote to appoint an Acholi to replace Oyite Ojok. One obvious candidate, Bazilio Olara-Okello who, although unrelated to Tito Okello, was, as in the case of Oyite Ojok, another officer who participated in the overthrow of Idi Amin. Obote, nevertheless, appointed a junior Langi officer, Smith Apon-Achak. This further alienated the Acholi officers who overthrew Obote's government two years later.

Despite having fought against Museveni, Oyite-Ojok has been honored by the latter's government as a national hero.
