= Ateker Ejalu =

Ugandan government minister

Minister of Information and National Guidance of Uganda
- In office 11 April 1979 – 25 June 1979

Minister of Regional Co-operation of Uganda
- In office 25 June 1979 – 20 November 1979

Managing Director of the Uganda Railways Corporation
- In office 1980–1985

Personal details
- Born: June 15, 1939
- Died: December 18, 2008 (aged 69) Nairobi, Kenya
- Resting place: Otatai, Asuret Sub-County, Soroti District, Uganda
- Political party: Uganda People's Congress

John Ateker Ejalu (15 June 1939 – 20 December 2008) was a Ugandan journalist and statesman. He served as Minister of Information and National Guidance of Uganda from April until June 1979, and from then as Minister of Regional Co-operation until November 1979.

== Early life ==
Ateker Ejalu was born on 15 June 1939 to a Kumam father and an Iteso mother. He was baptised in the Catholic Church and given the Christian name Johnson, but he was later christened in the Anglican Church as John. From 1961 until 1967 he served as secretary of the Uganda Students Association in the United Kingdom and edited its newspaper, UGASSO. While in the United Kingdom he founded the local branch of the Uganda People's Congress (UPC) and served as editor of one of its magazines, The Vanguard. In 1965 he was elected president of the Council of African Organisations in the United Kingdom and Ireland. The following year he was made deputy secretary general of Ugandan students in Europe.

== Career ==
Ejalu served as a researcher for President Milton Obote for nearly a year before being appointed editor of the People's Newspaper. In June 1970 Ejalu was made editor of the Uganda Argus, thus becoming its first Ugandan manager. He served in that capacity until Idi Amin deposed Obote in 1971 and assumed power. On 17 April he became Amin's first civilian political prisoner when he was arrested and incarcerated in Makindye Prison. In March 1972, agents of Amin took him from his home and beat him to dissuade him from supporting Obote. He later became an anti-Amin partisan, joining the Save Uganda Movement (SUM) and moving to Arusha, Tanzania. In 1977 the Tanzanian government agreed to arm and train some SUM guerrillas, and a program was organised by Ejalu and Tanzanian officials.

On 11 April 1979 President Yusuf Lule named Ejalu Minister of Information and National Guidance. Lule was replaced by Godfrey Binaisa, who appointed Ejalu Minister of Regional Co-operation on 25 June. On 20 November Binasia removed him from the post and made him Ambassador to Japan. Ejalu refused to go abroad to assume the position. Upon Obote's return to power in 1980, he was appointed Managing Director of the Uganda Railways Corporation. He later resigned in 1985, before Obote was again deposed.

Upon Yoweri Museveni's assumption of power in 1986, Ejalu fled into exile in Kenya. He returned in 1987 when, as a sign of reconciliation, Museveni appointed him Minister of State. After a period of civil war and insurgency, a peace agreement was reached in 1988 between the National Resistance Movement (NRM)-led government and the rebellious Uganda People's Democratic Movement (UPDM). As Minister of State, Ejalu was given responsibility for pacification of conflict areas and tasked with completing negotiations with the UPDM. In August 1989 he went to London to meet with the organisation's leaders. His efforts brought about the signing of the Addis Ababa Accord on 13 July 1990. He then concentrated on achieving reconciliation with other political dissidents, and succeeded in convincing several of them to return to Uganda. That year he also appointed the members of the Presidential Commission for Teso, which successfully negotiated a reduction of the Teso Insurgency.

== Later life ==
In 2008 Ejalu fell ill with meningitis. On 14 November he was brought to the International Hospital Kampala. Four days later Ejalu was sent to The Nairobi Hospital. He died there on 20 December 2008. At the direction of President Museveni, Ejalu was given a state funeral. He was buried in Otatai, Asuret Sub-County, Soroti District on 23 December 2008.
