= Front for National Salvation =

Ugandan rebel group led by Yoweri Museveni

- Leader: Yoweri Museveni
- Dates active: 1971–1973 (unofficially); 1973–1980/81 (officially)
- Ideology: Socialism
- Size: c. 200 (1973); 30 (1978) c. 9,000–10,000 (mid-1979)
- Part of: Uganda National Liberation Army (from 1979)

The Front for National Salvation (FRONASA) was an Ugandan rebel group led by Yoweri Museveni. The group factually emerged in 1971, although it was formally founded in 1973. FRONASA, along with other militant groups such as Kikosi Maalum (led by Milton Obote), formed the Uganda National Liberation Front (UNLF) and its military wing the Uganda National Liberation Army (UNLA) in 1979 to fight alongside Tanzanian forces against Idi Amin.

== History ==
=== Emergence and early operations ===
FRONASA originated as a group of militant left-leaning intellectuals led by Yoweri Museveni. Its founding members mostly were ex-followers of President Milton Obote who had fallen out with him. The group's membership belonged to the Banyankole and Banyarwanda peoples. When Obote was overthrown during the 1971 Ugandan coup d'état, resulting in Idi Amin's assumption of the Ugandan Presidency, the Ugandan left split. Some decided to cooperate with Amin, while others went into exile to organize a militant resistance. Strongly opposed to Amin's regime, Museveni and his small group of comrades decided to team up with Obote's faction despite their previous disagreements.

Museveni's group was based in Tanzania and covertly supported by its host country in various ways. The insurgents repeatedly entered Uganda to gather intelligence and carry out sabotage missions. In August 1971, Museveni's force attempted to set up a guerrilla base on Mount Elgon, but its undisciplined and barely trained fighters were quickly discovered and arrested by Ugandan security forces. The group consequently sent 30 fighters to train with FRELIMO in Mozambique. At the time, FRELIMO was allied with the Tanzanian government which facilitated the Mozamicans' contacts with Museveni. After their training, these cadres infiltrated Uganda. In 1972, Museveni's fighters took part in an attempted invasion of Uganda by Obote-led insurgents. The attack failed completely, however, and the rebels suffered heavy losses.

=== Official foundation and the Uganda–Tanzania War ===
In early 1973, Museveni officially announced the formation of the "Front for National Salvation" and published a manifesto targeting Amin, titled "An Indictment of a Primitive Fascist". At this point, FRONASA had about 200 members. Around this time, another FRONASA camp near Busoga in Uganda was discovered and destroyed by the Uganda Army. FRONASA underground operations were dismantled, and nine members of the group were executed by a firing squad. The group's activities consequently declined. In 1974, 40 to 50 FRONASA cadres led by Museveni were sent for another training mission to Mozambique. They were supposed to be taught about gerrilla warfare by FRELIMO, but the FRONASA fighters were unruly and the training of little success. From 1974 to 1978, FRONASA was mostly dormant, although it continued occasional training.

In late 1978, the Uganda–Tanzania War broke out and the armed Ugandan opposition movements rallied to fight alongside the Tanzanians against Amin's regime. At the time, FRONASA had just 30 armed members. After the Tanzania People's Defence Force (TPDF) defeated the Ugandan invasion of Kagera, it counterattacked into Uganda. FRONASA guerrillas consequently acted as scouts for the Tanzanian 206th Brigade, aiding it during the capture of Mbarara. In March 1979, the Tanzanian government organized the Uganda National Liberation Front (UNLF) and its armed wing, the Uganda National Liberation Army (UNLA). The UNLF/UNLA was supposed to serve as an umbrella organization to unify all Ugandan rebel factions, including FRONASA. Regardless of this nominal unification, the UNLF was split into numerous sub-units according to the wishes and needs of the Tanzanian military. Following the Fall of Kampala and overthrow of Amin's regime in April 1979, Museveni became Minister of Defence in the new Tanzania-backed UNLF government of Uganda. FRONASA consequently acted as his private army and he recruited a large number of Tutsi and Banyankole to bolster its ranks. The group was about 9,000 to 10,000 fighters strong at its peak by mid-1979. As a result of recruiting many Tutsi who were refugees from Rwanda, FRONASA became aligned with the newly founded Rwandese Alliance for National Unity, an organization that aimed at creating an army of Tutsi exiles to overthrow the government of Rwanda. From April 1979, however, Museveni had left the frontlines to involve himself in politics in Kampala.

Meanwhile, FRONASA continued to aid the Tanzanians to securing the rest of western Uganda, helping the TPDF to conquer Fort Royal, Masindi, and the West Nile region. In course of this campaign, anti-Amin tribal militias, vigilantes, and FRONASA militants "unleashed terror" on Muslim civilians. Museveni's followers regarded the Muslims as partisans of Amin who had played an important part in defeating FRONASA's earlier insurgencies. Museveni's fighters carried out several massacres in the Ankole region, and their campaign in the West Nile region was described by researcher Ogenga Otunnu as "systematic extermination" of the local population, killing thousands of civilians. In addition, FRONASA began to clash with its nominal ally, namely Milton Obote's private army Kikosi Maalum. Museveni was reportedly horrified at the mob violence, and especially at the involvement of his own followers in the massacres. He tried to put a stop to the worst excesses, and ordered arrests of some of the participants.

== Dissolution ==
After the UNLF assumed full control of the country, Milton Obote gradually outmaneuvered Museveni and his followers. He sidelined the latter in politics, allowed just 4,000 FRONASA fighters to join the new Ugandan army and had them split up among numerous units, and finally forced the rest of Museveni's private army to disarm. What remained of FRONASA became the core of the Popular Resistance Army (and later the National Resistance Army) when Museveni launched a rebellion against Obote's new government in 1981. The ex-FRONASA cadres brought much-needed political and military experience with them, and allowed the PRA/NRA to develop a broad supporter base. This contributed to its eventual victory in the Ugandan Bush War.
