= 1980 Ugandan general election =

- 10 and 11 December 1980

126 of 156 seats of the National Assembly 64 seats needed for a majority
- Registered: 4,898,117
- Turnout: 4,174,308 (85.22%)
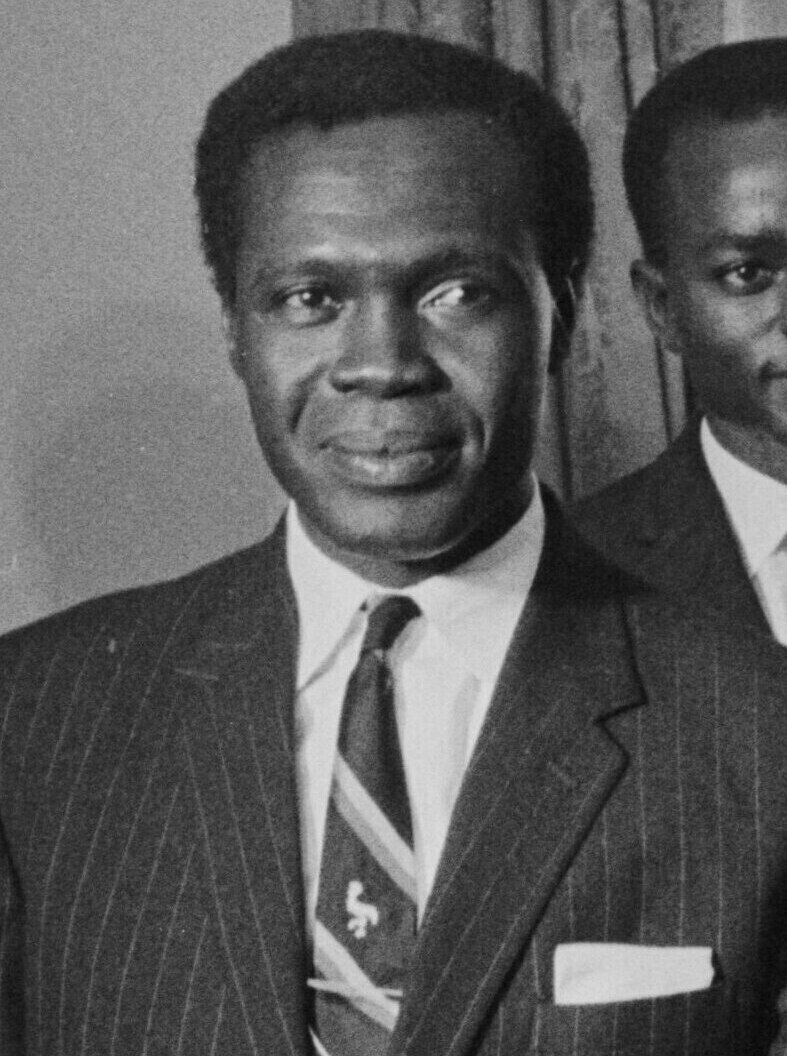

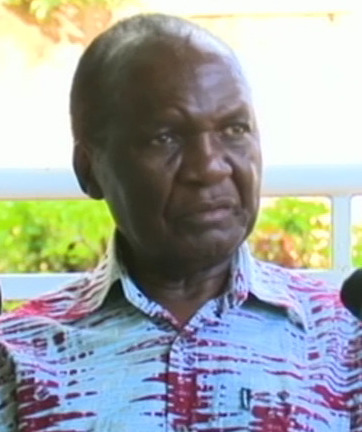

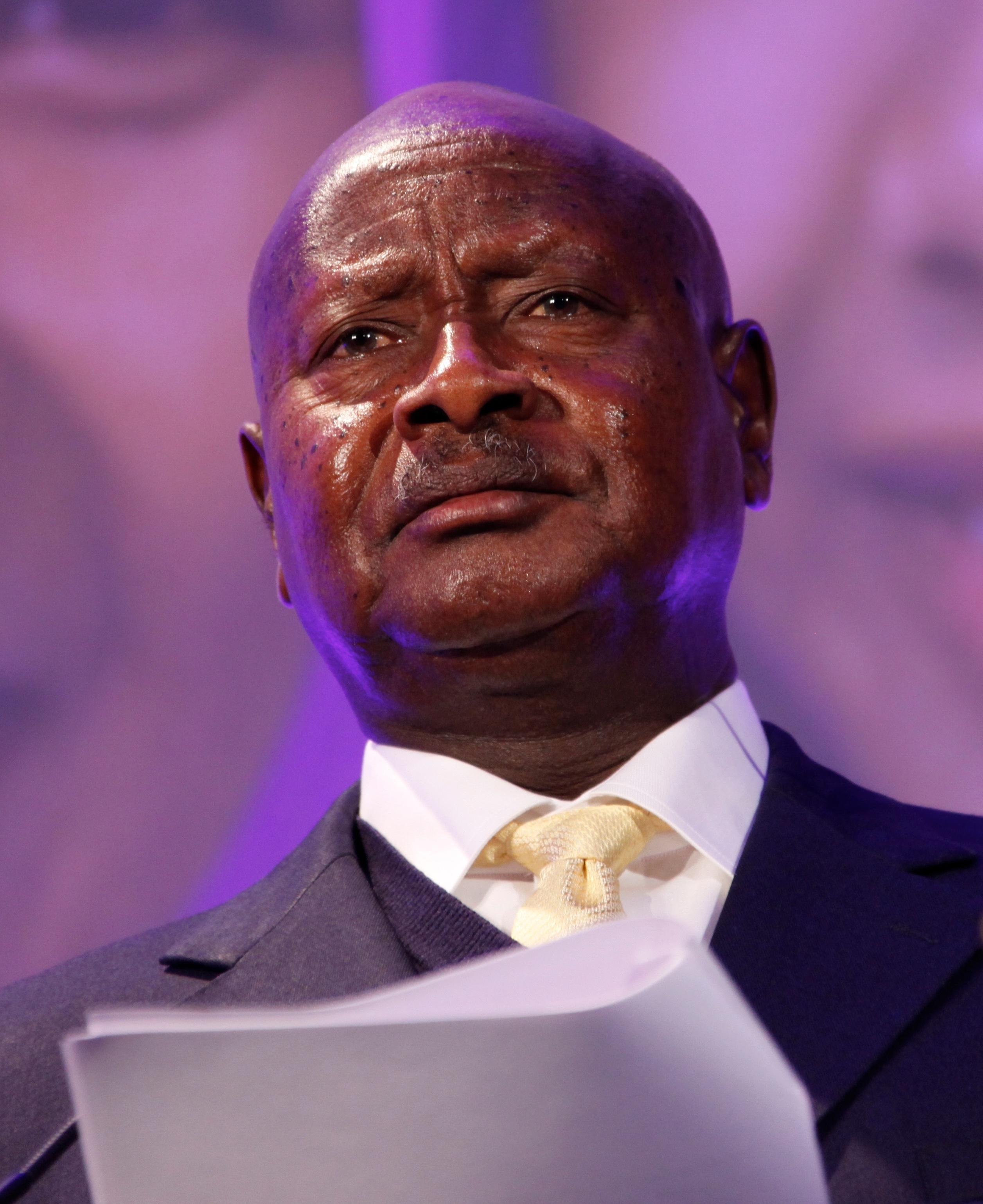
| | First party | Second party | Third party |
|---|---|---|---|
| Leader | Milton Obote | Paul Ssemogerere | Yoweri Museveni |
| Party | UPC | DP | UPM |
| Seats won | 75 | 50 | 1 |
| Popular vote | 1,963,679 | 1,966,244 | 171,785 |
| Percentage | 47.07% | 47.13% | 4.12% |
President before election
Presidential Commission
Elected President
Milton Obote
UPC

General elections were held in Uganda on 10 and 11 December 1980. They followed the overthrow of Idi Amin the previous year and were the first since the pre-independence elections in 1962. The result was a victory for the Uganda People's Congress (UPC) of President Milton Obote, which won 75 of the 126 seats. Voter turnout was 85%.

The UPC was the only party to contest all 126 seats, and its candidates were returned unopposed in seventeen constituencies. The opposition claimed that the UPC had only won through widespread fraud. Several opposition groups united as the National Resistance Army (NRA) under the leadership of Yoweri Museveni to start an armed uprising against Obote's government on 6 February 1981.

== Results ==
| Party | Votes | % | Seats | +/– |
|---|---|---|---|---|
| Democratic Party | 1,966,244 | 47.13 | 50 | +26 |
| Uganda People's Congress | 1,963,679 | 47.07 | 75 | +38 |
| Uganda Patriotic Movement | 171,785 | 4.12 | 1 | New |
| Conservative Party | 70,181 | 1.68 | 0 | New |
| Total | 4,171,889 | 100.00 | 126 | +44 |
| Valid votes | 4,171,889 | 99.94 | | |
| Invalid/blank votes | 2,419 | 0.06 | | |
| Total votes | 4,174,308 | 100.00 | | |
| Registered voters/turnout | 4,898,117 | 85.22 | | |
Source: Nohlen et al.
