= Kikosi Maalum =

Special battalion

Special Force
- Kikosi Maalum
- Leaders: Milton Obote; David Oyite-Ojok; Tito Okello
- Dates active: 1971–1978 (precursor groups); 1978–1979 (officially)
- Size: c. 600–800 (late 1978) c. 5,000 (Sept. 1979)
- Part of: Uganda National Liberation Army (from 1979)

Kikosi Maalum (meaning "Special Force" in Swahili), also known as the Special Battalion or the grand coalition, was a militia of Ugandan exiles formed in Tanzania to fight against the regime of Idi Amin. The unit was founded by and loyal to former Ugandan President Milton Obote, and served as his de facto private army. It was commanded by former army officers David Oyite-Ojok, and Tito Okello. Kikosi Maalum took part in the Uganda–Tanzania War, fighting alongside the Tanzanian military against Amin's forces. In course of this conflict, the militia was nominally unified with other Ugandan rebel groups, forming the Uganda National Liberation Army (UNLA) in 1979. After the fall of Amin's regime and Obote's return to power, Kikosi Maalum became the core of Uganda's new national army.

== History ==
=== Obote's rebel movement ===
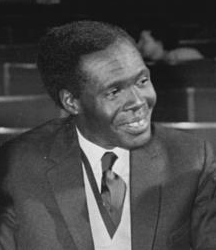
Milton Obote, leader of Kikosi Maalum

Milton Obote had served as Uganda's president until he was overthrown by Idi Amin in the 1971 Ugandan coup d'état. Obote consequently went into exile, and tried to regain power. Many Uganda Army soldiers attempted to flee Uganda to link up with Obote. Hundreds of these deserters, mostly Acholi and Langi, were captured by security forces loyal to Amin and massacred. However, Obote still organized a guerilla force in exile. One group of pro-Obote militants was provided by Tanzania with a training camp at Kingolwira, where 294 fighters had been amassed by August 1971. Another, larger faction was located in Sudan. Assisted by the Sudanese Armed Forces, about 700 to 1000 Ugandan exiles were trained at Owiny Ki-Bul to launch an invasion into Uganda. However, the Sudanese government and Amin's government concluded an agreement in May 1972, whereupon Obote and his forces had to leave the country. These militants were transported from Sudan to Tanzania, but on the way many got sick and died due to unhealthy transport conditions.

Regardless, Obote continued to organize a militant anti-Amin resistance movement in Tanzania. At the time, his armed faction was reportedly known as the "Uganda People's Liberation Front" (UPLF). Having unified his militia with the guerrilla group of Yoweri Museveni, Obote dubbed the umbrella rebel force the "People's Army". The "People's Army" attempted to invade Uganda in 1972. Obote's forces were completely defeated and the unit suffered heavy losses including hundreds killed. The remnants of his rebel army were subsequently reorganized. By 1978, the unit had about 600 or 800 trained fighters, most of whom were ex-soldiers who had fled Uganda due to Amin's ethnic and political purges. It mostly recruited Acholi and Langi.

=== Operations as "Kikosi Maalum" ===
When the Uganda–Tanzania War broke out in late 1978, Obote's militia acted as auxiliaries for the Tanzania People's Defence Force in combat against Amin's Uganda Army. At this point, his troops became known as "Kikosi Maalum". Obote also used Kikosi Maalum and associate guerrilla groups to instigate a revolt against Amin in Uganda, but these attempts failed, most notably during the Battle of Tororo. While advancing into southern Uganda, Kikosi Maalum militants terrorized Muslims in the Ankole region and occasionally clashed with another rebel faction, Museveni's FRONASA, despite being officially allies. The Tanzanian government subsequently organized the Uganda National Liberation Front (UNLF) and its military wing, the Uganda National Liberation Army (UNLA), as umbrella organizations to unify all Ugandan rebel factions, including Kikosi Maalum. Regardless of this nominal unification, the UNLF was split into numerous sub-units according to the wishes and needs of the Tanzanian military. As a result, Kikosi Maalum continued to operate as separate force. Its troops aided the Tanzanians in several battles, and helped to end Amin's regime. As the fighting was still ongoing, Kikosi Maalum was rapidly expanded by enlisting new members in territories conquered from Amin's forces. As a result, the militia was initially the most powerful Ugandan rebel group in the UNLA, allowing Obote to gain much influence in the UNLF Military Commission.

After Uganda–Tanzania War's end in 1979, a new UNLF government was formed to govern Uganda. Obote quickly began to dominate this government, and outmaneuvered his political rivals. Accordingly, he tried to empower Kikosi Maalum which had become his private army. The unit had about 5,000 fighters by September 1979. These troops provided the core for Uganda's new national army. After Obote officially returned to power as president following the disputed 1980 election, opposition groups launched rebellions. Kikosi Maalum veterans consequently fought for Obote's government in the Ugandan Bush War. After years of civil war, Obote was ousted by Tito Okello in the 1985 Ugandan coup d'état. Okello was, in turn, defeated by Yoweri Museveni in 1986. Thereafter, Kikosi Maalum veterans were retrenched from the military. Kikosi Maalum veteran Justine Odong Latek later founded the Uganda People's Democratic Army.

=== Legacy ===
In the 2010s, 100 Kikosi Maalum veterans formed the "Kikosi Maalum Cooperative Society Limited" to advocate for their interests and lobby for government recognition of their role in the overthrow of Idi Amin. The lobby group was headed by Lt. Col. Bosco Omure. President Museveni and State Minister for Defence Jeje Odongo gifted USh 30 million and USh 10 million respectively to the Kikosi Maalum Cooperative Society Limited in late 2014.
