= Soroti =

Ugandan town

Soroti Solot
- Soroti
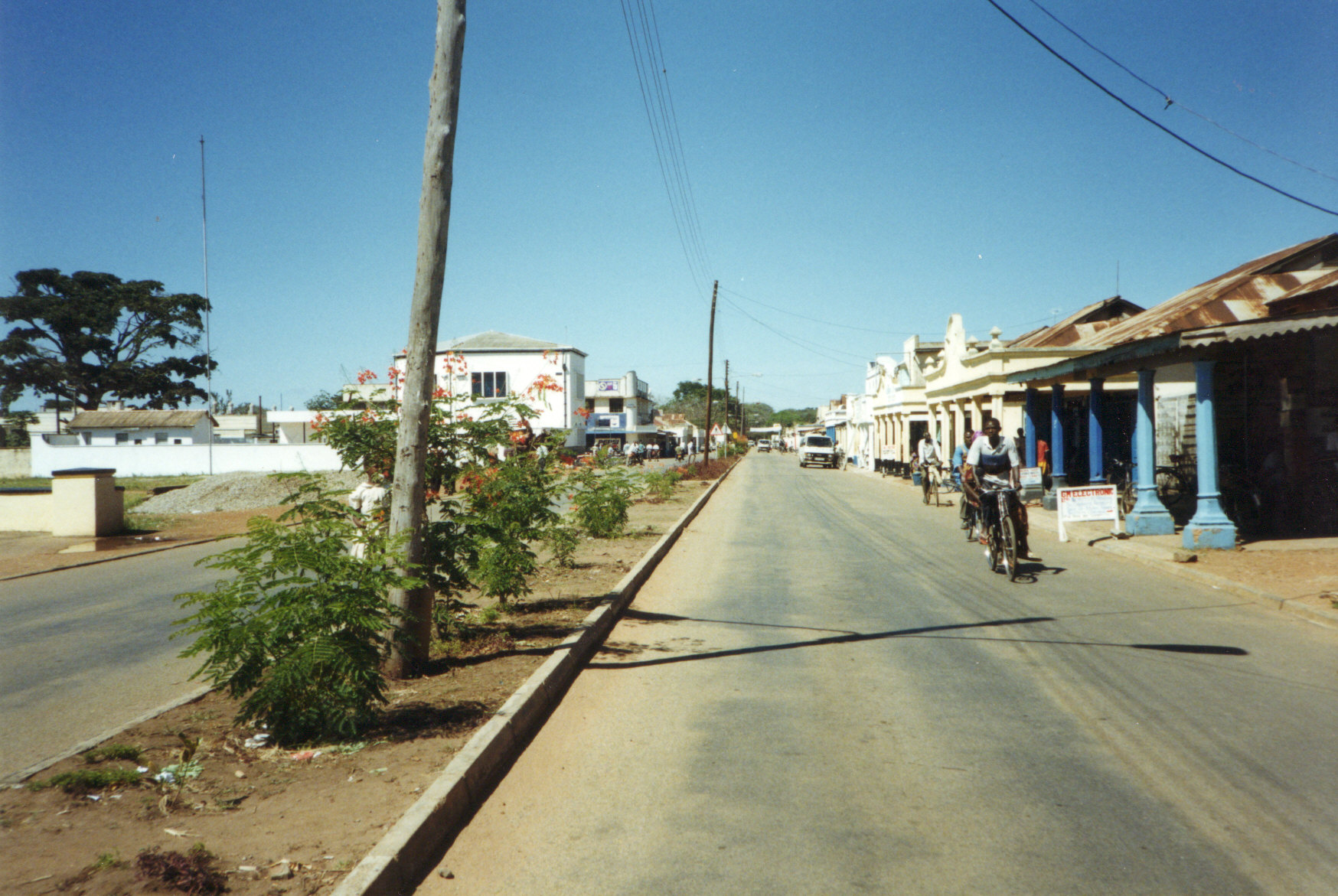
- Soroti Main Street

- Location in Uganda
- Coordinates: 01°42′54″N 33°36′40″E
- Country: Uganda
- Region: Eastern Region of Uganda
- Sub-region: Teso sub-region
- District: Soroti District

Government
  - Type: City Council
  - Mayor: Mr. Paul Omer
  - Chief Administrative Officer: Mr. Moses Otimong
- Elevation: 3,710 ft (1,130 m)

Population (2024 Census)
  - Total: 134,199
- Website: soroticity.go.ug

Soroti is a city in Eastern Region of Uganda. It is the main city, commercial, and administrative center in Soroti District, one of the nine administrative districts in the Teso sub-region. Soroti city was immediately approved for operationalization ahead of schedule by the Parliament of Uganda in the Financial Year 2020/2021.

== History ==
In the late Uganda–Tanzania War, Soroti suffered from lootings as well as mass killings committed by fleeing Uganda Army troops. When the Uganda National Liberation Army (UNLA) and the Tanzania People's Defence Force's 7th Battalion captured the town as part of the Eastern Uganda campaign of 1979, they found it plundered and discovered the corpses of about 50 civilians. (Note: When UNLA and TPDF soldiers discovered the mass grave at Soroti, UNLA officer Joseph Obonyo initially claimed that it contained "more than 200" corpses.) The local Radio Uganda station was left mostly undamaged, however, and was quickly broadcasting again.

In the last phase of the Ugandan Bush War in early 1986, the area around Soroti became the site of heavy fighting. Rebelling UNLA troops and Karamojong militias ambushed retreating loyalist UNLA forces in the area, and later blocked the Awoja Bridge near Soroti. On 12 February 1986, Soroti itself was captured by the National Resistance Army (NRA) as part of its efforts to conquer northern Uganda.

== Geography ==
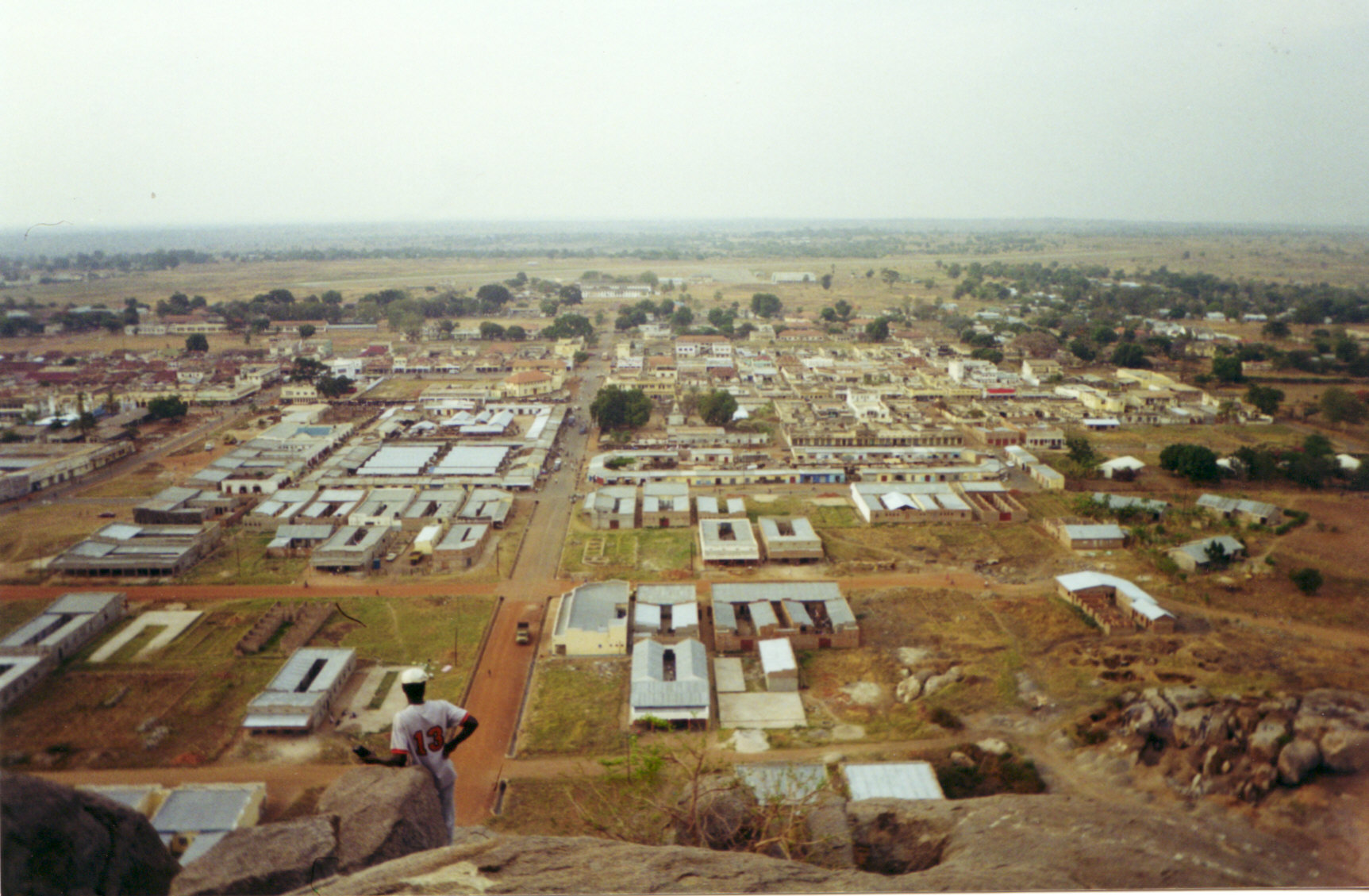
View of central Soroti City from the Rock

Soroti City is surrounded by Soroti District, of the Teso sub-region, in the Eastern Region of Uganda, lying north of Lake Kyoga. Soroti is approximately 103 kilometres (64 mi), by road, northwest of the city of Mbale, the largest urban centre in Uganda's Eastern Region. Soroti lies on the Tororo–Mbale–Soroti Road or Lira-Mbale route, approximately 326 kilometres (203 mi), by road, northeast of Kampala, Uganda's capital and largest city. The coordinates of Soroti are 1°42'54.0"N, 33°36'40.0"E (Latitude:1.715000; Longitude:33.611111). Soroti lies at an average elevation of 1,130 metres (3,707 ft) above mean sea level.

=== Climate ===
Climate data for Soroti (1961–1990)
Month	Jan	Feb	Mar	Apr	May	Jun	Jul	Aug	Sep	Oct	Nov	Dec	Year
Mean daily maximum °C (°F)	32.0 (89.6)	32.0 (89.6)	31.2 (88.2)	29.7 (85.5)	29.4 (84.9)	28.9 (84.0)	28.4 (83.1)	28.6 (83.5)	29.8 (85.6)	29.8 (85.6)	29.6 (85.3)	30.7 (87.3)	30.0 (86.0)
Mean daily minimum °C (°F)	17.8 (64.0)	18.6 (65.5)	18.9 (66.0)	18.7 (65.7)	18.3 (64.9)	18.1 (64.6)	17.9 (64.2)	17.7 (63.9)	17.7 (63.9)	17.8 (64.0)	17.9 (64.2)	17.8 (64.0)	18.1 (64.6)
Average rainfall mm (inches)	68.4 (2.69)	63.0 (2.48)	131.5 (5.18)	169.3 (6.67)	117.5 (4.63)	69.2 (2.72)	63.1 (2.48)	95.7 (3.77)	108.4 (4.27)	138.0 (5.43)	148.7 (5.85)	91.5 (3.60)	1,264.3 (49.77)
Source: World Meteorological Organization

== Population ==
The 1969 national population census enumerated the population of Soroti at 12,398. In 1980, the population had increased to 15,048. During the 1991 national census, Soroti's population was 40,970. In August 2014, the national population census put Soroti's population at 49,685. The Uganda Bureau of Statistics (UBOS) estimated the mid-year population of Soroti in 2020, at 60,900. The table below illustrates the data in tabular format.

Historical population
Year	Pop.	±%
1969	12,398	—
1980	15,048	+21.4%
1991	40,970	+172.3%
2014	49,685	+21.3%
2020	60,900	+22.6%

== Education ==
Soroti hosts the main campus of Soroti University, a public institution of higher education, located in the suburb of Arapai. Soroti is also home to secondary campuses of Kumi University, and Kyambogo University. Soroti Secondary School is one of the biggest day school in Teso.

== Transport ==
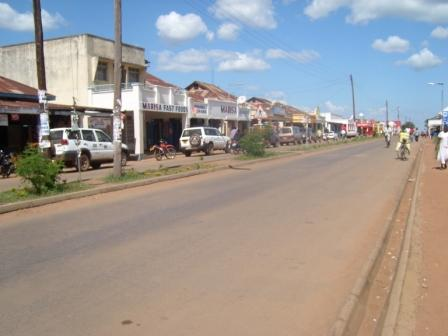
A street in Soroti Town.

Soroti is connected to Mbale and Lira via the tarmacked Tororo–Mbale–Soroti Road and Soroti–Dokolo–Lira Road. The recently completed Soroti–Katakwi–Moroto–Lokitanyala Road connects the town to Moroto, in extreme northeastern Uganda. The Soroti–Amuria–Abim–Kotido Road, remains gravel surfaced, as of July 2020.

Soroti is also served by Soroti Airport, lying approximately 3.5 kilometres (2 mi), by road, northeast of the central business district of the town.

== Points of interest ==
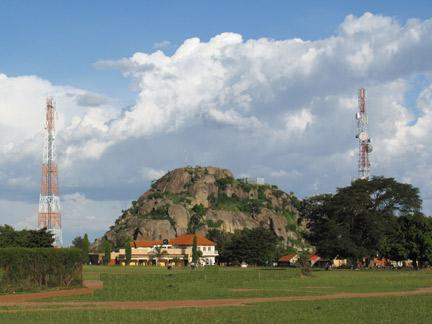
Soroti rock

The following points of interest are located in Soroti or near the town limits: 1. The headquarters of Soroti District Administration 2. The offices of Soroti Town Council 3. A branch of the National Social Security Fund 4. Soroti Regional Referral Hospital, a 275-bed public hospital administered by the Uganda Ministry of Health 5. The main campus of Soroti University, a public institution of higher education 6. Teso College Aloet, an all-boys boarding secondary school 7. Lwala Soroti Hospital, a 135-bed, non-governmental hospital, administered by the Uganda Catholic Medical Bureau 8. Soroti Solar Power Station, a privately owned solar power plant with generation capacity of 10 megawatts 9. Soroti Rock, a volcanic rock formation. 10. Soroti central market 11. The headquarters of the Roman Catholic Diocese of Soroti and 12. Tororo-Lira-Kamdini Highway, which passes through the center of town in a north-west/south-east direction.

Soroti is also home to Soroti Fruit Processing Factory, a joint venture between Uganda Development Corporation and Teso Tropical Fruit Growers Cooperative Union, built with assistance from Korea International Cooperation Agency and was opened in April 2019.

== See also ==
- Soroti Rock
- Teso sub-region
- List of cities and towns in Uganda
