= Birungi =

Birungi is a surname. Notable people with the surname include:

- Barbara Birungi (born 1986), Ugandan technologist
- Grace Birungi (born 1973), Ugandan runner
- Irene Birungi (born 1973), Ugandan entrepreneur, broadcaster, and columnist
- Patrick Birungi (born 1968), Ugandan economist
