= Eastern Uganda campaign of 1979 =

Eastern Uganda campaign
- Part of the Uganda–Tanzania War
Date	15 April – c. May 1979
Location	Eastern Uganda
Result	Tanzanian-led victory
Territorial changes	Eastern Uganda mostly secured by Tanzania People's Defence Force; Karamoja mostly left under Karamojong control

Belligerents
Tanzania; Uganda National Liberation Front; Uganda Army renegades Karamojong groups	Uganda

Commanders and leaders
(Tanzania) Mwita Marwa (Tanzania) Salim Hassan Boma (Tanzania) Ben Msuya (Tanzania) L.G. Sandys (Tanzania) Dick Mwandetelle (WIA); Joseph Obonyo; Malinga	Unknown

Units involved
(Tanzania) 208th Brigade: 7th Battalion; 17th Battalion; 18th Battalion; 19th Battalion; 24th Battalion	Eagle Colonel Gaddafi Battalion; Eastern Brigade

Strength
(Tanzania) 4,000; UNLA: 1,000; Mbale defectors: 250	Unknown

The Eastern Uganda campaign of 1979 was a military operation by Tanzanian forces and allied Ugandan rebels, most importantly the Uganda National Liberation Army, against Uganda Army (UA) troops loyal to Idi Amin during the Uganda–Tanzania War. The operation was launched by the Tanzania People's Defence Force (TPDF) on 15 April 1979 to secure eastern Uganda and oust UA remnants which were still active in the area. The TPDF mainly targeted the important towns of Jinja, Mbale, Tororo, Soroti, and Moroto. It encountered only sporadic resistance, as most UA soldiers focused on fleeing with loot instead of resisting, and successfully secured most of eastern Uganda. In the northeast, the collapse of the Uganda Army resulted in local Karamojong groups seizing much weaponry which would result in long-lasting security issues.

== Background ==
Map of the battles of the Uganda–Tanzania War

In 1971, Idi Amin became President of Uganda after overthrowing his predecessor, Milton Obote, in a military coup. This event precipitated a deterioration of relations with the neighbouring state of Tanzania. Amin ruled the country under a repressive dictatorship. In October 1978, the Uganda Army launched an invasion of Tanzania under disputed circumstances, resulting in open war. Tanzania halted the assault, mobilised anti-Amin opposition groups, and launched a counter-offensive.

In a matter of months, the Tanzania People's Defence Force (TPDF) and its Ugandan rebel allies—unified under the umbrella organisation Uganda National Liberation Front (UNLF) and its armed wing Uganda National Liberation Army (UNLA)—defeated the Uganda Army in a number of battles, and occupied Kampala, Uganda's capital, on 11 April 1979. With his military disintegrating or already in open revolt, Amin's rule was collapsing. The Ugandan President and many of his forces fled to the eastern city of Jinja; thousands of Uganda Army soldiers reportedly retreated eastward from Kampala.

== Prelude ==
After capturing Kampala, the TPDF initially rested, reorganized, and resupplied. However, the Tanzanians were under public pressure to advance against Jinja, as the town hosted the Owen Falls Dam which generated hydroelectric power, supplying electricity to all of Uganda and portions of Kenya. In addition, newspapers reported that Uganda Army troops were murdering civilians along the road to Jinja.

Meanwhile, Amin made a short-lived attempt at rallying his forces in eastern Uganda. He implored the people and soldiers in Jinja to resist the Tanzanians and vowed to make his "last stand" there and die in battle. According to journalist Nelson Bwire Kapo, Amin even declared Jinja the new capital of Uganda. Afterwards he moved to Mbale where he addressed the Eastern Brigade under Abdulatif Tiyua, urging them to also continue fighting. The President then fled to Arua, where he was picked up by a Libyan military plane and flown to Tripoli into exile.

Afterwards, a few officers continued to try to hold out, but most Uganda Army soldiers in eastern Uganda focused on fleeing with as much loot as possible. The Eagle Colonel Gaddafi Battalion descended into internal fighting, and much of its remaining forces including its commander Hussein Mohammed fled to Kenya. At Moroto, the local garrison consisting of the Gondo Battalion had already begun to disintegrate in early 1979. By April of that year, most of the unit's Kakwa and Nubian soldiers had fled to Sudan. Only 78 soldiers remained at Moroto, waiting to surrender.

== Campaign ==
=== Local anti-Amin resistance ===
Soon after Amin had left, Mbale experienced an uprising. The local commander, Tiyua, had initially intended to continue resisting the Tanzanians, but found his soldiers deserting in large numbers. He consequently left Mbale with about 100 other loyalists. This left a group of about 250 Uganda Army soldiers led by Major Malinga in control; these troopers included members of several Uganda Army units who had previously fled from as far as Mbarara and Masaka before halting at Mbale. After receiving reports about Kampala's fall, Malinga's group decided to stop fleeing and to switch sides instead. Bolstered by local civilians, they set up roadblocks around Mbale, and pledged to defend the town from the retreating Amin loyalists. Tiyua's group eventually reached the Kenyan border. They intended to march through Kenyan territory to Sudan, but were arrested by Kenyan security forces and extradited to Uganda.

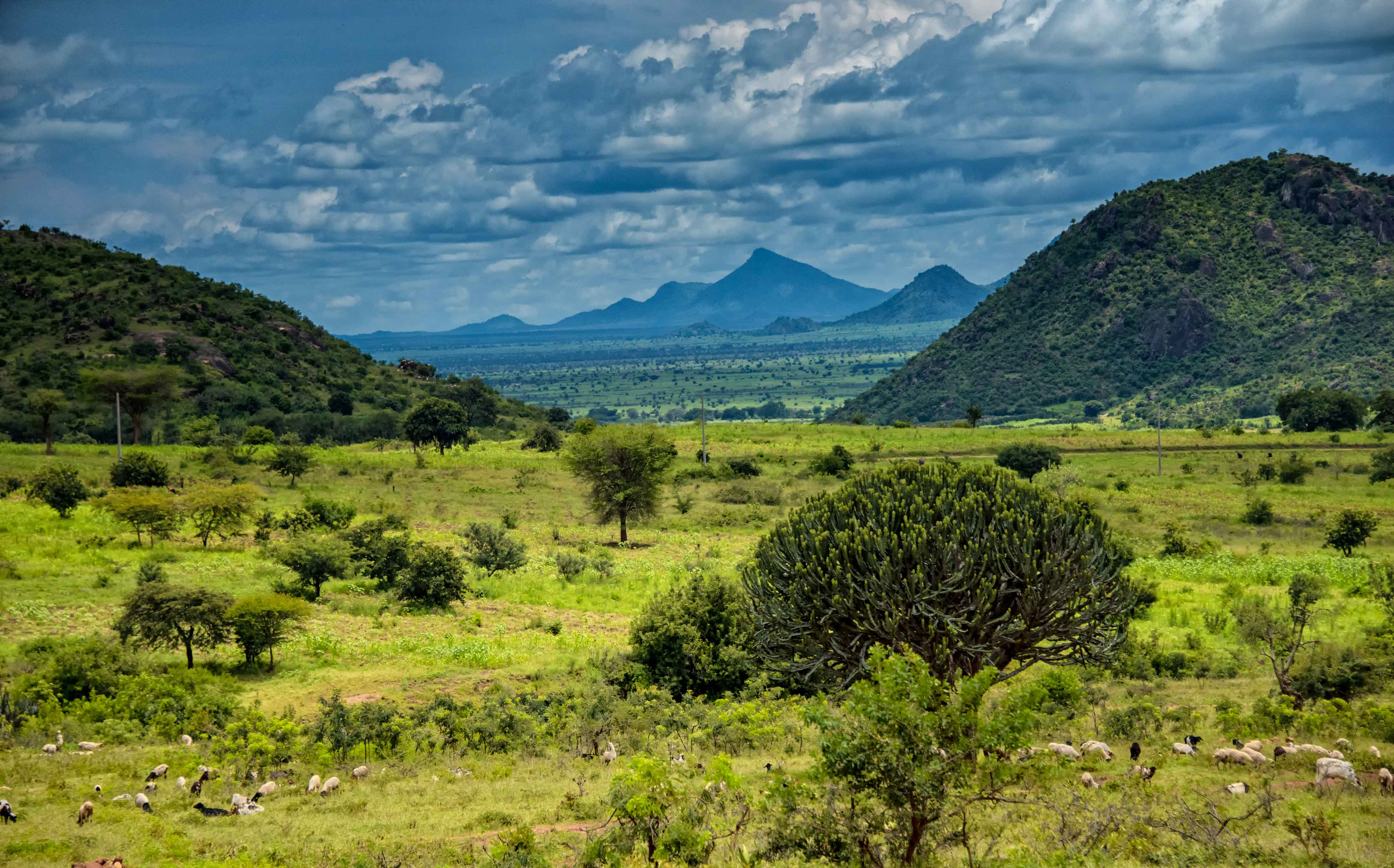
In Karamoja, Uganda Army soldiers fled, leaving Karamojong to seize their weaponry, overpower the police and raid cattle.

In the Karamoja region in the northeast, the local Karamojong exploited the gradual collapse of Amin's regime. The Karamojong were a nomadic people that maintained a strong sense of independence; they were notorious for their tradition of cattle raiding. They had been marginalized and driven off their lands by the Ugandan, Sudanese, and Kenyan governments; increasingly forced into smaller territories with fewer resources and attacked by other cattle herders, most importantly Turkana, the Karamojong became more prone to banditry and inter-communal fighting. When Amin's government fell apart in 1979, the Uganda Army troops stationed in Karamoja feared the Karamojong's fierce reputation as warriors, causing them to flee and leave much weaponry behind. At the abandoned barracks of Moroto, the Karamojong seized many modern small arms, and defected Uganda Army soldiers of Karamojong ethnicity instructed their compatriots on how to use them. Most weapons fell into the hands of the Mathiniko clan who lived close to Moroto; the Mathiniko promptly began to use their new power to raid cattle from other clans, killing at least 54 in raids. Police who were still loyal to the Amin government attempted to investigate at Namalu, but fell into an ambush by the raiders; 15 policemen were killed. The escalating violence resulted in serious issues for local society, as the young raiders took their newly acquired wealth in form of cattle into the bush to keep it safe, leaving the old people behind. Traders from other regions, fearing attacks, refrained from travelling to Karamoja. This resulted in an incipient food shortage.

=== Capture of Jinja ===
The Tanzanians eventually assigned the 208th Brigade under Brigadier Mwita Marwa, their unit with the most combat experience, to capture Jinja. A total of 4,000 Tanzanian and 1,000 UNLA troops were to partake in the operation. At least some of the involved UNLA troops were led by Lieutenant Joseph Obonyo. They were to be accompanied by three Tanzanian tanks, one T-54 and two T-34s. The combined TPDF-UNLA force was able to requisition numerous vehicles in Kampala when it departed the city on 15 April, but had to share them among different groups of soldiers as it moved down the two-lane road toward Jinja. Even though progress was slow due to the lack of adequate vehicles, the TPDF-UNLA force encountered no resistance on its way to Jinja, with the troops instead relaxing, listenining to music from looted radios, and eating Sugarcane along the way. Hundreds of civilians from road-adjacent communities such as Mukono, Seta, Namataba, and Lugazi joined the column, intermingling with the soldiers and helping to carry equipment.

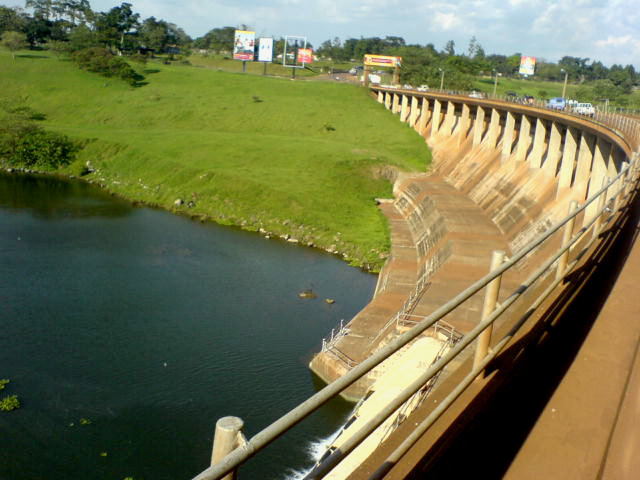
The Owen Falls Dam (pictured) was captured by Tanzanian forces after a short fight.

When the Tanzanian-led force eventually arrived in Jinja's vicinity, it received widely diverging reports by locals about how many Uganda Army soldiers were left garrisoning the Owen Falls Dam as well as the city. Estimates ranged from 200 to 2,000 Amin loyalists. After substantial preparations, the TPDF began its assault with an artillery bombardment on 22 April. For the most part, the TPDF-UNLA force encountered little resistance, as most of the Eagle Colonel Gaddafi Battalion had fled beforehand and the remainder mostly melted away soon after the battle's start. They left behind a dozen tanks and armoured personnel carriers as well as much ammunition at Jinja's barracks.

=== Tanzanian arrival at Tororo and Mbale ===
On 25 April, the TPDF's 208th Brigade—bolstered by the vehicles seized from the Eagle Colonel Gaddafi Barracks—advanced out of Jinja for the Kenyan border. The brigade's 17th Battalion under Lieutenant Colonel Salim Hassan Boma was left behind to maintain law and order in the city. At a road junction near Mbale, the brigade split into three battalions; one went to Mbale, one went to Moroto, and one went to Tororo.

The 19th Battalion under Lieutenant Colonel Ben Msuya was assigned to Tororo. It encountered no resistance on the way to its target. TPDF soldiers stopped at Bugembe, Iganga, Bugiri, and several villages to search for Uganda Army soldiers, but found none. When the battalion eventually arrived at a cement plant just outside Tororo, it spotted a Tata truck commonly used by Amin's troops. The truck was approaching the column, and the leading Tanzanian tank promptly shot at it, missing the vehicle. The truck quickly stopped and five Uganda Army soldiers with female companions leapt out, successfully escaping into the nearby bush despite being targeted by the Tanzanians with machine gun fire. The TPDF force then proceeded to destroy the abandoned truck. The column continued to Tororo, finding it almost completely deserted (Note: According to Tom Cooper and Adrien Fontanellaz, a group of Uganda Army soldiers belonging to Tororo's garrison had previously mutinied and assisted Msuya's troops in securing the town.) and looted. The local civilians as well as the old garrison had fled to Kenya. The 19th Battalion consequently garrisoned Tororo. Some TPDF troops continued their march from Tororo to the border town of Busia, encountering a truck with fleeing UA soldiers on the way. The Tanzanians opened fire, destroying the vehicle and killing several soldiers.

Meanwhile, the 208th Brigade's 18th Battalion under Lieutenant Colonel Emmanuel Moyo moved to Mbale. The TPDF troops found the town in good order; unlike most other settlements in the area, it had not suffered from looting. The retreating Amin loyalists had left the city alone after the 250 Uganda Army renegades and locals had set up defenses. When the Tanzanians arrived at the city, they were greeted by a large celebration and impressed by how well order had been kept at the city. Most of the renegade Uganda Army soldiers were subsequently sent to Kampala, but Malinga and a few other officers stayed with the Tanzanians to assist in the advance to Moroto and Soroti. Moyo and his men remained behind to secure Mbale.

=== Clash at Mbale junction ===
The remainder of the 208th Brigade was sent northward. The 24th Battalion led by Lieutenant Colonel L.G. Sandys targeted Moroto, while the 7th Battalion under Major Dick Mwandetelle continued to Soroti. Both battalions had only been recently assembled, and were much more inexperienced than the other 208th Brigade units. The 7th Battalion initially secured a road junction north of Mbale before the 24th was sent from Tororo to join them. However, there was a 224 kilometres (139 mi) distance from Mbale to Moroto, and Sandys lacked vehicles to transport his soldiers. He struggled to acquire trucks and buses; after some delay, he was able to convince Msuya to lend him some in Tororo and commandeered more from other settlements. Ultimately, he was only able to accumulate enough vehicles for most of his force, and had to leave one company behind. Meanwhile, Sandys sent the three tanks assigned to his force ahead to the Mbale junction. Having guarded the junction for several days, the 7th Battalion soldiers grew lax and opted to celebrate at Mbale the night before the meet-up with the 24th Battalion, instead of staying on guard. As a result, a group of Amin loyalists was able to move past the junction without getting noticed.

At dawn on the next day, the tanks were already at the Mbale junction, whereas the 7th Battalion troops were returning from Mbale and the 24th Battalion was gradually moving in on trucks and buses. Just as the TPDF tank crews were awakening, their position came under small arms and recoilless rifle fire by the Uganda Army loyalists. As the Tanzanians were not at their positions and unsure from where they were attacked, they fell into chaos. The tank crews quickly rallied, however, spotting their opponents at a 550 metres (1,800 ft) distance and responding with their machine guns. After a shootout lasting five minutes, the Amin loyalists fell back and fled toward Soroti. Two TPDF soldiers were wounded during the clash, while the Uganda Army loyalists suffered no losses. Both battalions were shaken by the incident.

=== The 7th Battalion's advance to Soroti ===
Regardless of the attack at the junction, Sandys was quick to get his unit moving again, advancing to Moroto with his overcrowded buses and the three tanks. In contrast, Mwandetelle was unsure about how to proceed, as the Amin loyalists had retreated to Soroti and he had no idea whether enemy forces might be setting up ambushes. While he and other 7th Battalion discussed their future actions, three local boys approached them and reported that six armed but tired Amin loyalists were walking at a nearby path. Within fifty minutes, the 7th Battalion was following the same path, led by the boys; they initially found no sign of the Amin loyalists, but inhabitants of a nearby hut reported that the Uganda Army soldiers had seemingly moved into a local swamp. The Tanzanians consequently approached the swamp and tried to flush out any hiding Amin loyalists, but found none.

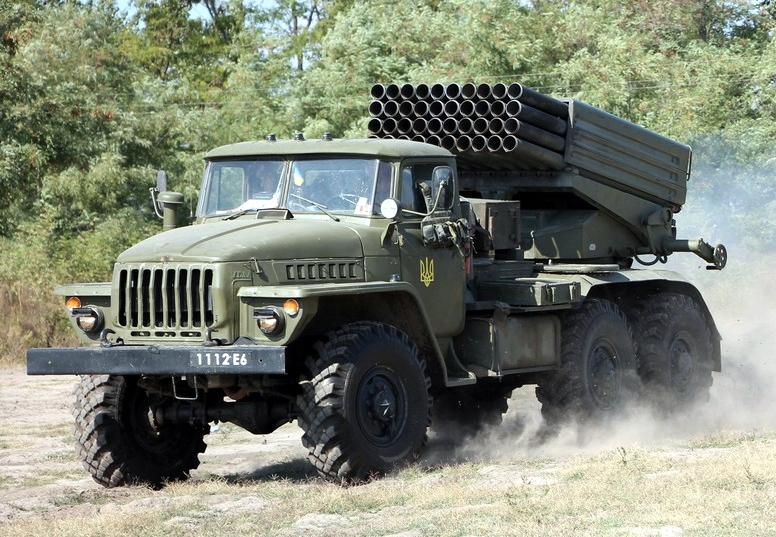
At Bukedea, the 7th Battalion was almost bombarded by its own BM-21 Grad multiple rocket launchers (example pictured).

The 7th Battalion then returned to the road, where they met up with Major Malinga and another renegade officer. He offered to drive ahead of the battalion, arguing that he could inspect any Amin loyalists who he encountered, as they probably did not know that he had defected. Mwandetelle agreed to the plan, whereupon Malinga and his comrade put on their old uniforms and took off in their white Mercedes-Benz car. After half an hour, they returned; Malinga reported that he had found only ten Amin loyalists who had informed him that all other troops were fleeing to Sudan. Malinga had told them to retreat as well, and they had agreed. Satisfied, Mwandetelle's force began to advance to Soroti with three tanks in the lead. On the way, they encountered only a bus which had crashed –with eight dead Amin loyalists inside– and some civilians who claimed to have found a State Research Bureau (SRB) agent. Instead of checking the information, the Tanzanian soldiers shot up the house where the agent was allegedly hiding, only to discover that it was occupied by three women and nine children who had "miraculously" survived unharmed. The soldiers realized that the locals had only accused the three women and their families of being SRB agents because they were Muslims from the north. The 7th Battalion was left further demotivated and embarrassed by this incident, and continued its advance until arriving in the vicinity of Bukedea. Having been informed by local villagers that Amin loyalists might be staying there, Mwandetelle ordered his BM-21 Grad multiple rocket launchers to shoot over the small town to scare any possible enemies into fleeing. However, a lack of information and bad coordination almost caused the artillery to fire on the other TPDF troops instead of over Bukedea; Malinga was the one who noticed that the BM-21s had false coordinates and was able to prevent a friendly fire incident. Instead, the 7th Battalion just moved into the settlement, encountering no enemies. (Note: According to Al J Venter, the TPDF unit involved in this campaign fielded BM-24 on ZiL trucks.)

On the next day, the 7th Battalion advanced into Kumi where a group of Amin loyalists resisted for short time before fleeing. Major Mwandetelle was wounded by shrapnel during the clash, and had to be evacuated; he was the highest-ranking Tanzanian officer to be injured in the entire war. The 7th Battalion's final target, Soroti, was captured without any fighting. Uganda Army troops had only moved through the town, looted it, and murdered about 50 civilians (Note: When UNLA and TPDF soldiers discovered the mass grave at Soroti, UNLA officer Joseph Obonyo initially claimed that it contained "more than 200" corpses.) before fleeing to Lira further in the north. The local Radio Uganda station was left mostly undamaged, however, and was quickly broadcasting again. At Soroti, the Tanzanians had to wait for 10 days before supplies could catch up.

=== The 24th Battalion's advance to Moroto ===
Map of Uganda showing locations of the 24th Battalion's advance

The 24th Battalion's journey to Moroto was also difficult, hindered by mountainous terrain. One night, the column entered the small town of Namalu, and the three leading Tanzanian tanks almost ran into a car and a Land Rover which were driven by Uganda Army soldiers. The latter quickly turned off their lights, abandoned the Land Rover and used the car to drive away, leaving the Tanzanians to fire blindly into the darkness. The TPDF soldiers proceeded to free and feed the half-starved inmates of Namalu's prison before continuing their journey. As they continued, the unit was hampered by the tanks' batteries wearing out. Eventually, only one tank fully functioned and was forced to tow the other two to get them started. As it got further north, the 24th Battalion increasingly encountered Karamojong; as the nomads opposed Amin's regime, they welcomed the Tanzanians and offered to help with their advanced intelligence network. In this way, the 24th Battalion learned that a group of 12 Uganda Army loyalists, armed with at least one 106-mm recoilless rifle, had unsuccessfully attempted to flee to Kenya before setting up an ambush for the TPDF at a mountain pass near Nakapiripirit. They had chosen a well defendable position and effectively blocked the pass.

Sandys judged that an attempt to carefully dislodge the enemy with infantry would need too much time, so he decided to try to scare the Amin loyalists away: He ordered the entire 24th Battalion to assemble at a spot well visible but out of range of the Amin loyalists. Sandys assumed that the 12 Uganda Army soldiers would not try to fight about 1,000 Tanzanians; just as he had expected, the loyalists fled after seeing his force. When the battalion began to travel through the steep mountain pass, however, an accident killed one soldier and injured 34 more; the latter had to be sent back to Mbale. In addition, one bus was destroyed and a supply truck badly damaged. The entire battalion had to return to Nakapiripirit reorganize before attempting to cross the pass again. However, the last functioning tank battery finally wore out, and the 24th Battalion was forced to leave its tanks at Nakapiripirit.

The second attempted crossing of the mountains resulted in another accident which killed four soldiers, but the column pressed on this time. The 24th Battalion was able to travel the remaining way to Moroto without further incidents, only occasionally encountering Karamojong groups in the arid Karamoja region. About 10 kilometres (6.2 mi) from the town, Sandys ordered his men to get out of their vehicles and march the remaining distance. Even though the Karamojong intelligence network had informed him that Moroto was undefended, he wanted to be sure. He ordered his artillery to fire a few shells into the nearby hills to scare possible Amin loyalists away, and then sent his force into the settlement. There, the Tanzanians encountered thousands of spear-armed Karamojong who celebrated their arrival. In addition, the local civil servants had not fled like in other regions, instead pledging loyalty to the new UNLF government of the country. The 24th Battalion also encountered the 78 Uganda Army soldiers who had waited at the local barracks to surrender. In the next months, a few Uganda Army soldiers continued to roam Karamoja, stealing cattle and adding to the general insecurity in the region.

== Aftermath ==
The Uganda–Tanzania War continued until 3 June, when Tanzanian forces reached the Sudanese border and eliminated the last resistance. After capturing the eastern regions, the Tanzanians had to restore order. Many TPDF officers found themselves as ad hoc mayors. L.G. Sandys was faced with an especially difficult task, as the food shortages in Karamoja was escalating into a famine. As the local traders had enough money, while regions to the south had ample food, the problem did not lie with a lack of resources. Rather, Sandys had to restore the supply routes, trust, and trade which had been disrupted by the cattle raiding of the well-armed Karamojong youths. To do so, he first gained the Karamojong traders' trust by offering to take their money and use it to buy food in the south, while using the 24th Battalion as intermediary to safely transport both the cash as well as the supplies. Accountants from the traders were able to accompany the soldiers on the way, ensuring that the process was honest. Afterward, the traders sold the food to those who were starving. Sandys' operation was a general success, and almost solved the food crisis.

He then tried to solve the general insecurity. He estimated that about 12,000 modern guns were now in the hands of the Karamojong, and attempted to convince the local clans to hand over the weaponry to reduce fighting and raiding. The clan elders promised to not attack the Tanzanians, but refused to hand over their guns until they could assess how fairly they would be treated by the new UNLF government. However, Sandys was able to convince the most powerful Karamojong leader and raider, "General" Apalolirisi, to reduce the raiding and send the large cattle herds from the remote bush back to the population centers of southern Karamoja to help feed the population. However, as time went on, new ethnic conflicts began, as neighboring communities and the Karamojong began to raid each other. Sandys was transferred, and communal violence once again rose in frequency. By mid-1980, The Washington Post reporter Jay Ross described Karamoja as "Land of the Damned" where starvation was frequent and large-scale banditry was widespread. Besides Karamojong militias and Uganda Army remnants, "Malire from Ethiopia, Terposa from Sudan, Turcanas from Kenya, Somali bandits" had become active in the area. The TPDF withdrew from Uganda in 1981, leaving an unstable and weak UNLF government in power which was unable to bring the country's armed groups under control. Throughout the 1980s, armed Karamojong groups were "terrorizing" other Ugandan communities and became involved in the Ugandan Bush War, acquiring even more guns. Karamojong cattle raiding escalated during the war in Uganda (1986–1994).
