= Uganda Development Corporation =

- UDC

Agency overview
- Formed: 1952; 74 years ago
- Jurisdiction: Government of Uganda
- Headquarters: Kampala, Uganda
- Agency executives: Chairman, Ham Mugenyi; Executive Director, Patrick Bitonder Birungi
- Parent agency: Uganda Ministry of Trade, Industry & Cooperatives
- Website: Homepage

The Uganda Development Corporation (UDC) is an agency of the government of Uganda. It promotes and facilitates the industrial and economic development of Uganda. Formed in 1952, it had some success in promoting local industrial development and was swelled with the addition of newly nationalised industries in the early 1970s. These, however, proved too much for the corporation, and it went into a slow decline before being completely phased out in 1998. The organisation was reconstituted with similar aims in 2008.

== History ==
=== Before Amin (1952–1971) ===
The UDC was created by the British colonial administration in 1952 to "facilitate the industrial and economic development of Uganda". Under the Uganda Development Corporation Act 1952, the objective of UDC was to "promote and assist in the financing, management or establishment of— new undertakings; schemes for the better organisation and modernisation of and the more efficient carrying out of any undertaking; and the conduct of research into the industrial and mineral potentialities of Uganda." It was given a starting equity of £5 million, which it quickly grew. According to Roger Falk <Falk, R. 1970. The Business of Management. Penguin Books Ltd.>, a UK management consultant, as a development corporation, the Uganda Development Corporation was the best of its kind in the world

At the time of Ugandan independence in 1962, a report commissioned by the outgoing British administration and incoming government and overseen by the World Bank commented that "the UDC has energetically explored a wide range of industrial possibilities" among a backdrop of economic pessimism over coffee prices, which Uganda was (and remains) heavily reliant on. By this time, the UDC was already one of the two largest public corporations of the government, a "principal instrument in the country's development program." The same report was complimentary of the UDC's performance, describing it as "presently the most important entrepreneur in Uganda and a successful one in this most difficult field of fostering development." By 1965, it had turned a post-tax profit every year since its creation (albeit with some help from tariff protection) and employed (including subsidiaries) over 18,000 people, engaged in projects as diverse as cement and cotton. State control of the economy was on the increase. The UDC, which had previously provided startup equity before selling out to private investors, was now given the legal right to retain majority shareholding in companies it had been instrumental in setting up, and with the 1970 Nakivubo Pronouncement, which allowed for stakes up to 60 percent.

=== Under Amin (1971–as above1979) ===
After new President Idi Amin presided over the expulsion of Asians from Uganda in 1972, the UDC gained control over some of the largest enterprises previously controlled by those expelled, to which it added some 90 nationalised British holdings in the country later in the same year. Acquisitions from the Asians included much of the profitable Madhvani and Mehta Groups (with the exception of the sugar industry), and from the British a diverse portfolio including tea plantations, a printing firm, a cigarette factory, and a hoe factory.

Together, these gains should have provided it with a possible turnover of $100 million and doubled its assets. Both the rapid nature of the growth and the sudden lack of experienced technicians and managers, however, proved a challenge for the corporation. Uganda's industrial development strategy had been unsuccessful in promoting human resource development as the 1962 report had suggested, and local entrepreneurial capabilities "were not promoted and nurtured". Technological capabilities were also lacking. Indeed, by late 1973 such was the lack in management capability that the UDC was unable to obtain financial reports from 14 of its 52 subsidiaries, and there were tensions in the boardroom. The Nakivubo Pronouncement was revoked and in some industries the UDC was instructed to refrain from owning controlling stakes.

The UDC started to decline. It had over-extended its capacity and could not effectively control the many industries in which it now owned stakes. Because of this, the public sector was re-organised again in 1974 creating nine holding companies, further weakening the UDC - some of its original profitable industries were removed, leaving it with the same liabilities but fewer assets. By the second half of the 1970s, with all viable manufacturing units reallocated, the UDC was reduced to a skeleton staff based in its headquarters.

=== After Amin (1979–present) ===
Faced with mounting economic strife, in 1982 the incoming Obote administration opted to liberalise the economy, returning some government-owned companies to former owners, including the Asian conglomerates. Some other nationalised companies, split from the UDC in 1974, were returned to it in a futile attempt to spur innovation.

== Restructuring ==
By the time the law that re-created UDC wound its way through Uganda's parliament in 2015, only one legacy asset remained, Lake Katwe Salt Works, in Kasese District.

New investments, focusing on public-private-partnerships, include the Kalangala Infrastructure Development Project, which is a joint venture between UDC, IDC of South Africa and InfraCo Holdings, of the United Kingdom. The US$50 million investment, includes a solar/thermal hybrid power station, procurement of two surface-vessel water transport crafts to connect the island with the mainland, electrifying Bugala Island, the largest in the Ssese Islands Archipelago, developing a water supply system on the island and developing a 66 kilometres (41 mi), gravel road network on the island.

Other new projects under UDC include the Kiira Motors Corporation, Soroti Fruit Processing Factory and the new start-up; Uganda National Airlines Company. UDC also owns a 32 percent stake in Atiak Sugar Factory.

Future projects include (a) Moroto Ateker Cement Company Limited, (b) Lake Victoria Glass Works Limited and Isingiro Fruit Factory. In April 2019, president Yoweri Museveni launched commercial production at Soroti Fruit Processing Factory, a US$13.4 million investment 80 percent owned by UDC.

== Investment portfolio ==
The operational investments as of August 2020, are listed in the table below:

Uganda Development Corporation Investment Portfolio
No.	Investment	UDC Ownership	Partner	Partner Ownership
1	Soroti Fruit Processing Factory	80%	Teso Tropical Fruit Growers Cooperative Union	20%
2	Atiak Sugar Factory	40%	Horyal Investments Holding Company Limited	60%
3	Kalangala Infrastructure Services Limited	45.7%	InfraCo Holdings	54.3%
4	Kigezi Highland Tea Company	Lease Financing		

== Governance ==
As of November 2021, the following individuals constituted the board of directors of UDC.

1. Godfrey R. Ruhurira: Chairman
2. Geraldine Ssali Busuulwa
3. Francis Ogwang
4. Edward Nyatia
5. Barbara Mulwana
6. Dorothy Masifa Ochela
7. Patrick Birungi: Executive Director
8. To be named: Representative of Ministry of Finance.

== See also ==
- Uganda Investment Authority
- Bukuzindu Hybrid Solar and Thermal Power Station
