= List of television stations in Uganda =

Television in Uganda was dominated by the state-owned channel Uganda Television (UTV), now known as Uganda Broadcasting Corporation, until the introduction of Sanyu, followed by Wavah Broadcasting Station (WBS TV) in 1999. Although those two stations no longer operate, as of 2023, there are many more stations in Uganda.

== Stations ==
The following is a list of fully licensed television stations in Uganda as of 2024:

1. UBC TV / Official National Television
2. UBC STAR TV.
3. UBC MAGIC 1.
4. UBC U24 TV.
5. APEX TV | Kampala
6. ARK TV | Entebbe
7. BTM TV | Kampala
8. BBS TV | Buganda Kingdom
9. DOXA TV/BUNYORO TV | Kampala
10. BABA TV | Kampala & Jinja
11. BUKALANGO TV | Kampala
12. BUKEDDE TV1 | Kampala
13. BUKEDDE TV2 | Kampala
14. BEE TV | Kampala
15. CHAMUKA TV | Kampala
16. CHANNEL 44 | Kampala
17. DELTA TV | Kampala
18. EMBASSY TV | Kampala
19. ETERNAL LIFE TV | Kampala
20. FUFA TV | Kampala
21. FACE TV | Kampala
22. FAMILY TV C.O.U | Kampala
23. FOCUS OF GOD TV | Kampala
24. GUGUDDE TV | Kampala
25. GMTV | Kampala
26. GALAXY TV | Kampala
27. GNTV | Mbarara
28. GTV Uganda Islam | Kampala
29. GLORIOUS TIMES TV | Kampala
30. HGTV | Kampala
31. HOPE TV SDA | Kampala
32. INDEX TV | Kampala
33. INSPIRE TV | Kampala
34. KSTV | Kampala
35. KBS TV | Kampala
36. KINGDOM TV | Kampala
37. KSTV | Mbarara
38. LIFE TV | Kampala
39. MAKULA TV | Kampala
40. MAKULA KIKA | Kampala
41. MANIFEST TV | Kampala
42. MOON TV | Kampala
43. NTV UGANDA | Kampala
44. NBS TV | Kampala
45. NBS SPORTS | Kampala
46. NYCE TV | Kampala
47. PEARL MAGIC | Kampala
48. PEARL MAGIC LOKO | Kampala
49. PEARL MAGIC PRIME | Kampala
50. REST TV | Kampala
51. REVIVAL TV | Mbarara
52. RWENZORI TV | Kasese
53. SALT TV | Kampala
54. TAYARI WEST TV | Mbarara
55. STV | Kampala
56. SANYUKA TV | Kampala
57. SANYUKA PRIME | Kampala
58. SALAAM TV | Kampala
59. SPIRIT TV | Kampala
60. SMART 24 TV | Kampala
61. SPARK TV | Kampala
62. TVNET | Mbarara
63. TV ONE | Kampala
64. TOP TV | Kampala
65. TV EAST | Soroti
66. TBS TV | Kampala
67. TV West | Mbarara
68. SMART 24 TV | Kampala
69. UCTV Catholics | Kampala
70. WORSHIP TV WTV | Kampala
71. WAN LUO TV | Gulu
72. WEST NILE TV | Gulu
73. MUBS TV
