= Maurice Mugisha =

Ugandan journalist, broadcaster and corporate executive

- Born: 1978 (age 47–48)
- Education: Makerere University Business School (Bachelor of Business Administration)
- Occupations: Journalist, television presenter & corporate executive
- Years active: 2005–present

Maurice Herbert Mugisha, is a Ugandan journalist, broadcaster and corporate executive who works as the deputy managing director of the government-owned media company, Uganda Broadcasting Corporation (UBC), effective October 2018.

Before that, for 12 years, he worked at Nation Television Uganda (NTV Uganda), owned by the Nairobi-based Nation Media Group, rising to the level of "Head of News Production", at the time of his departure for his present position.

== Education ==
He holds a Bachelor of Business Administration degree, awarded by the Makerere University Business School (MUBS), in the Nakawa Division of Kampala, Uganda's capital city, in the year 2003.

== Career ==
Mugisha was hired by WBS Television, (now defunct) in 2003, as a sports reporter, straight out of university. In September 2006, he left WBS TV for the then newly established NTV Uganda, based at the upscale Kampala Serena Hotel. For a period of time, before 2011, he worked, on secondment, at the Kenya-based sister television station NTV Kenya.

Starting out as a news anchor in 2006, he rose to the position of "Head of News Production", at the time of his departure in October 2018. He was then hired by Uganda Broadcasting Corporation as the deputy managing director.

== Family ==
Mugisha is married to personality, Irene Birungi who is the a Ugandan entrepreneur, broadcaster and columnist who works as a private secretary for administration at the office of the President of Uganda, Yoweri Kaguta Museveni, effective September 2017. Together they are parents to one son (from a previous relationship on Birungi's side), and two daughters that they had together.

== Other considerations ==
Maurice Mugisha is a co-founder, and serves as a director at All Round Consult, a media and public relations consulting firm in the Bukoto neighborhood of Kampala, Uganda's capital city.
