= Atiak Sugar Factory =

Ugandan sugar company

Coordinates: 03°25′05″N 32°07′52″E

Atiak Sugar Factory Limited
- Company type: Private
- Industry: Manufacture & Marketing of Sugar
- Founded: 2016; 10 years ago
- Headquarters: Atiak, Amuru District, Uganda
- Key people: Amina Moghe Hersi; Owner/CEO
- Products: Sugar
- Number of employees: 1,500+ (2016)

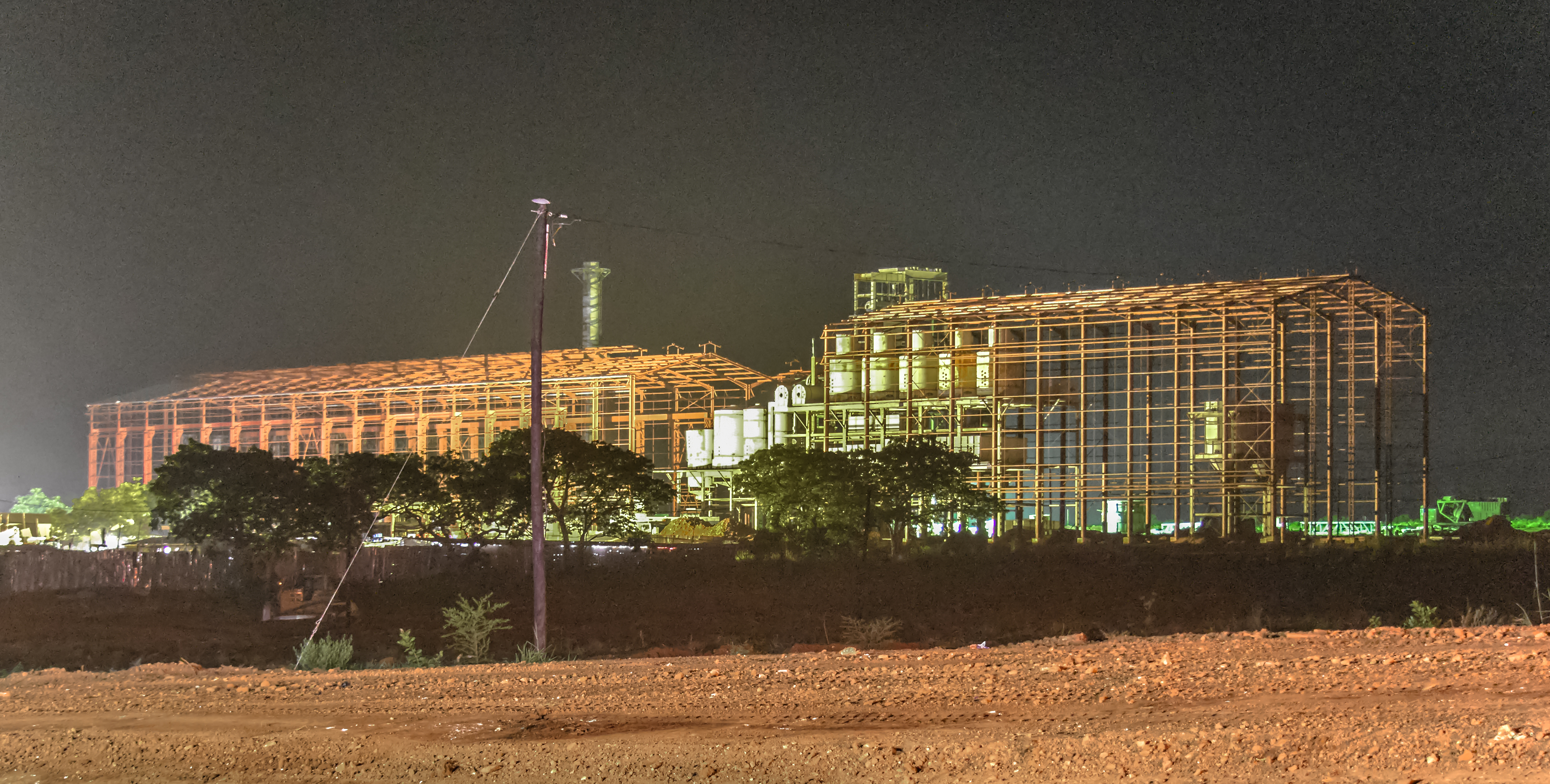

Atiak Sugar Factory Limited (ASFL), also Atiak Sugar Factory, or Atiak Sugar Limited, is a sugar manufacturing company in Uganda.

== Location ==
The company's headquarters and main factory are located in Gem Village, Pachilo Parish, Atiak sub-county, Kilak County, in Amuru District, in the Northern Region of Uganda. It is approximately 17 kilometres (11 mi) north of Atiak. Atiak Town is located approximately 69 kilometres (43 mi) north of Gulu, the largest city in Northern Uganda.

== Overview ==
The factory has the capacity to crush 1,650 tonnes (1,650,000 kg) of raw sugar cane daily, producing 66,000 tonnes (66,000,000 kg) of powder sugar annually. Commissioning of the factory was expected in May 2016, with first distribution of sugar planned for June 2017. The factory will employ over 1,500 people and has contracted with over 5,000 out-growers. The owners of the company have established a working relationship with Gulu Women Entrepreneurs Association Limited (GWEAL), whose objective is to develop Northern Uganda.

In July 2017, the government of Uganda extended a credit facility of US$17.4 million (approx. USh62.65 billion) to Horyal Investments Holding Company Limited, the owner of Atiak Sugar Factory. The loan, according to Uganda's finance minister will help Horyal to finish construction, procure the sugar-manufacturing machinery and start sugar production. Amina Hersi Moghe, the Chief Executive Officer of Horyal, says the credit will "provide support to sugarcane out growers, offset the balance of procuring machines and restructure their loan period with DFCU Bank". A new commissioning date has been pushed to June 2019.

== Construction ==
The supervising engineering company is Sugarnpower Projects Private Limited, from India. An electricity co-generation plant with initial capacity of 6 megawatts (8,046 hp), expandable to 27 megawatts (36,208 hp), is incorporated in the design.

As of July 2018, construction was estimated at 70 percent completed. At that time, Amina Morghe Hersi, had invested an estimated USh272 billion (US$70 million) and UDC had invested USh65 billion (US$17 million). In October 2019, the Daily Monitor newspaper reported that completion was slated for the first quarter of 2020. In March 2020, Dr. Amina Moghe Hersi indicated that commissioning of the factory was slated for April 2020.

In July 2020, The Independent (Uganda) newspaper reported that commercial production would start in August 2020.

== Production Halt ==
In March 2022, Atiak Sugar Factory in Amuru District temporarily shut down sugar production over inadequate cane supply. Although the factory was projected to shut down for a short time pending the production of more cane, the current projection points to 2025 when it's likely to resume.

It is expected that when the factory resumes production in late 2024 or early 2025, it will rely on irrigation and mechanization to boost productivity and be able to crush 1,650 tonnes of raw cane daily. During the 2022/2023 financial year, the Parliament of Uganda approved USh108 billion (approx. US$28.5 million) to establish an irrigation system and procure machinery and mechanize some of the tasks, including land clearing, planting, weeding, harvesting and collection of harvested cane.

== Ownership ==
The company is a subsidiary of Horyal Investment Holding Company Limited, owned by Amina Moghe Hersi, a female Kenyan entrepreneur of Somali descent. In May 2018, the government of Uganda, through the Uganda Development Corporation (UDC), took a 10.1 percent ownership in Atiak Sugar Factory, for an investment of USh20 billion (approximately US$5.5 million).

In July 2018, UDC invested another USh45 billion (approx. US$11.6 million), thus raising its stake in the factory to 32 percent. In April 2019, the company requested another USh 24 billion (approx. US$6.5 million), in funding to complete construction of offices and staff houses, with opening planned for the second half of 2019. This would bring the governments shareholding to 44 percent.

In September 2023, Ugandan print media indicated that Horyal Investments owned 51 percent and the Uganda Development Corporation owned 49 percent of the company shares.

Atiak Sugar Limited Stock Ownership
Rank	Name of Owner	Ownership (July 2018)	Ownership (May 2019)	Ownership (September 2023)
1	Horyal Investments Holding Company Limited	68.0	56.0	51.0
2	Uganda Development Corporation	32.0	44.0	49.0
	Total	100.00	100.00	100.00

== Co-generation ==
When the factory opens, it is expected to have crushing capacity of 1,650 metric tonnes of sugarcane daily with co-generation of 6 megawatts of electricity. Future production is expected to increase to 3,500 metric tonnes of sugarcane daily with co-generation of 27 megawatts.

== See also ==
- Economy of Uganda
- List of sugar manufacturers in Uganda
