= Joseph Obonyo =

Ugandan soldier and rebel

- Born: c. 1943; Kitgum, Protectorate of Uganda
- Military career
- Allegiance: Uganda (until 1986); UPDA (1986–1988); LRA (1988–?)
- Branch: Uganda Army Air Force; UNLA (1979–1986)
- Rank: Colonel
- Commands: Entebbe Air Base (UNLA); Gulu Air Base (UNLA); First Division (UPDA)
- Conflicts: Uganda–Tanzania War; Eastern Uganda campaign of 1979; Ugandan Bush War; Battle of Kampala; Northern Uganda campaign (January–March 1986); War in Uganda (1986–1994)

Joseph Obonyo was an Ugandan military officer and rebel leader. He initially served in the Uganda Army Air Force before joining the Uganda National Liberation Army (UNLA). He fought for the UNLA in the Uganda–Tanzania War and Ugandan Bush War. After the fall of Tito Okello's government and the UNLA's collapse, Obonyo joined rebel groups opposed to the government of Yoweri Museveni. He eventually went into exile in Great Britain.

== History ==
Born in Kitgum around 1943, Obonyo was an ethnic Acholi. At some point, Obonyo joined the Uganda Army Air Force, became a lieutenant, and trained in Nigeria. He eventually fled into exile. There, he joined the Ugandan opposition against Ugandan President Idi Amin. He subsequently fought as part of the Uganda National Liberation Army (UNLA) in the Uganda–Tanzania War of 1978–1979. He served as part of the UNLA contingent that took part in the Eastern Uganda campaign of 1979, during which he and his men discovered a mass grave in Soroti where civilians murdered by pro-Amin Uganda Army soldiers had been buried.

By 1984/85, he had risen to major and been appointed as "Director of Airforce Matters". He eventually became a lieutenant colonel. In mid-1985, long-standing tensions within the UNLA –particularly conflicts between Acholi and Langi soldiers– resulted in a series of mutinies and open clashes. Amid this unrest, Obonyo's house in Entebbe was attacked and "bombed" by two rival Langi officers. Eventually, an Acholi-led UNLA faction spearheaded by Bazilio Olara-Okello carried out a coup d'état, overthrew President Milton Obote, and installed a new government under Tito Okello. After the coup, Obonyo was promoted to colonel and appointed commander of the Entebbe Air Base. As the UNLA's military situation declined in the ongoing Ugandan Bush War, with National Resistance Army rebels gaining ground, Obonyo oversaw the move of a large amount of military equipment from the capital Kampala to northern Uganda.

In January 1986, he served as one of the UNLA commanders who oversaw the defense of Kampala against the NRA under Yoweri Museveni. He was responsible for the garrison troops guarding the Kampala–Entebbe Road. The UNLA ultimately lost the Battle of Kampala, but Obonyo escaped to northern Uganda, specifically Gulu. There, he and other UNLA commanders attempted to rally their troops and stem the NRA advance. Eventually, Tito Okello also arrived at Gulu, but the former president was widely blamed for the defeat of the UNLA. Obonyo even proposed to execute Okello "for the sufferings he had brought upon the Acoli". However, Bazilio Olara-Okello intervened on his former superior's behalf and allowed the ex-president to escape into exile. Obonyo was also involved in a plan to kill Museveni as the latter was sworn in as the new Ugandan President on 29 January 1986. Alongside Olara-Okello, he planned for a UNLA military helicopter to attack the ceremony to assassinate the NRA leader and his lieutenants. The plan failed as the helicopter opted to surrender rather than attempt to carry out the mission.

The UNLA holdouts were fully defeated by the NRA by March 1986, ending the Ugandan Bush War. Soon after, Obonyo joined other UNLA officers to organize the Uganda People's Democratic Army (UPDA) rebel group in exile, becoming part of its high command. He became head of the group's First Division and took part in the UPDA's unsuccessful campaign to overthrow the Museveni's government. Realizing that their forces could not achieve victory, the majority of the UPDA high command eventually voted in May 1988 to support a peace process and remove Justine Odong Latek from the UPDA's overall command. Obonyo was one of only two UPDA officers who voted against the proposal. Obonyo subsequently joined the Lord's Resistance Army in a leadership position to continue his militant opposition, but he was living in peaceful exile in Great Britain by the 2000s. There, he received an "Employee Excellence Award" by the Transport and General Workers' Union.
