= Irene Birungi =

Ugandan entrepreneur (born 1973)

Irene Birungi Mugisha
- Born: 1973 (age 52–53)
- Education: Amity University (Master of Business Administration)
- Occupations: Journalist, entrepreneur, public relations consultant
- Years active: 2000–present
- Spouse: Maurice Mugisha (m. 2006)

Irene Birungi Mugisha (née Irene Birungi; born 1973), is a Ugandan entrepreneur, broadcaster, and columnist who works as a private secretary for the administration at the office of the president of Uganda, Yoweri Kaguta Museveni, effective September 2017.

Mugisha is the founder of All Round Consult, a public relations and media firm, based in Kampala, Uganda's capital city. In October 2010, she became the first female television manager in Uganda after being appointed state broadcaster at Uganda Broadcasting Corporation. In 2013, she became the head of editorial and was a television producer with CNBC Africa. She is also a columnist for the Daily Monitor and New Vision on economic issues.

== Journalism career ==
Mugisha built her name as a journalist after being hired as a news anchor on WBS Television, (now defunct). Five years later, she joined Uganda Broadcasting Corporation Television (UBC Television) as a television producer and business editor. In October 2010, she was appointed as the television manager of UBC Television, the first woman in Uganda to hold such a position.

In 2013, she joined CNBC Africa as the head of editorial and television producer for their Uganda and Rwanda bureaus, where she presented the popular show Doing Business in Rwanda.

== Personal life ==
Mugisha is married to Maurice Mugisha, who is the deputy managing director of Uganda Broadcasting Corporation and works as an MC for corporate events. He previously worked as head of news at Nation Media Television Uganda.

She is the mother of three children: a son from a previous relationship, and two daughters with her current husband.
