= Soroti Rock =

Rock mountain in eastern Uganda

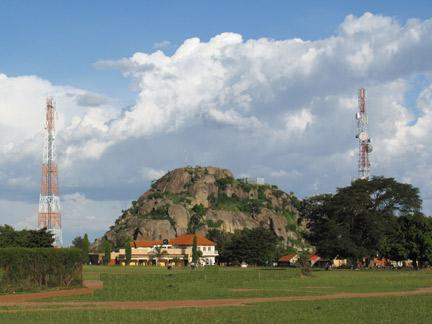

Highest point
- Elevation: 1,208 m (3,963 ft)

Geography
- Location within Uganda
- Location: Soroti, Eastern Region, Uganda

Soroti Rock is a striking granite formation prominent that towers above Soroti town center, Uganda, offering good views across to Lake Kyoga and Mt. Elgon from the pinnacle.
The rock rises approximately 90m out of plain landscape.

== Geography ==
Soroti Rock is part of a series of isolated rocky outcrops characteristic of eastern Uganda. The rock formation is composed primarily of granite and is surrounded by relatively flat terrain, which makes it visually dominant in the local landscape. Smaller rocks and caves are found around its base.

The rock provides panoramic views of Soroti town and the surrounding countryside and is visible from several kilometers away.

== Cultural and historical significance ==
Soroti Rock holds cultural significance among the Teso people, who traditionally associate the rock with local history and folklore. According to oral traditions, the rock and its surrounding caves served as places of refuge during periods of conflict in the precolonial era.

The rock has also been associated with early settlement patterns in the area, as its elevated position offered security and visibility.

== Conservation ==
There are no formal conservation structures currently in place specifically for Soroti Rock. However, it remains an important natural and cultural landmark for Soroti town and the surrounding communities.

== Scenery ==
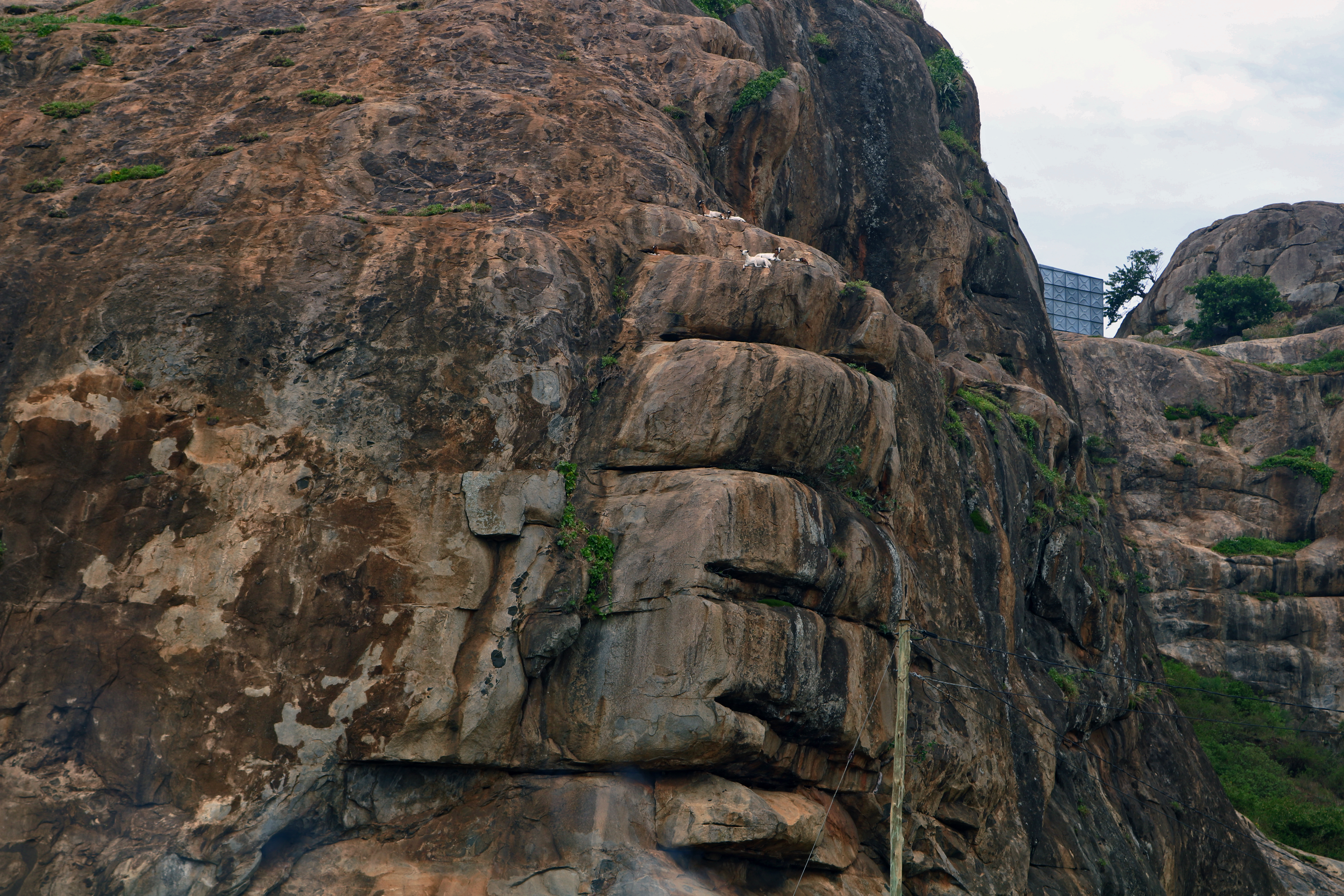

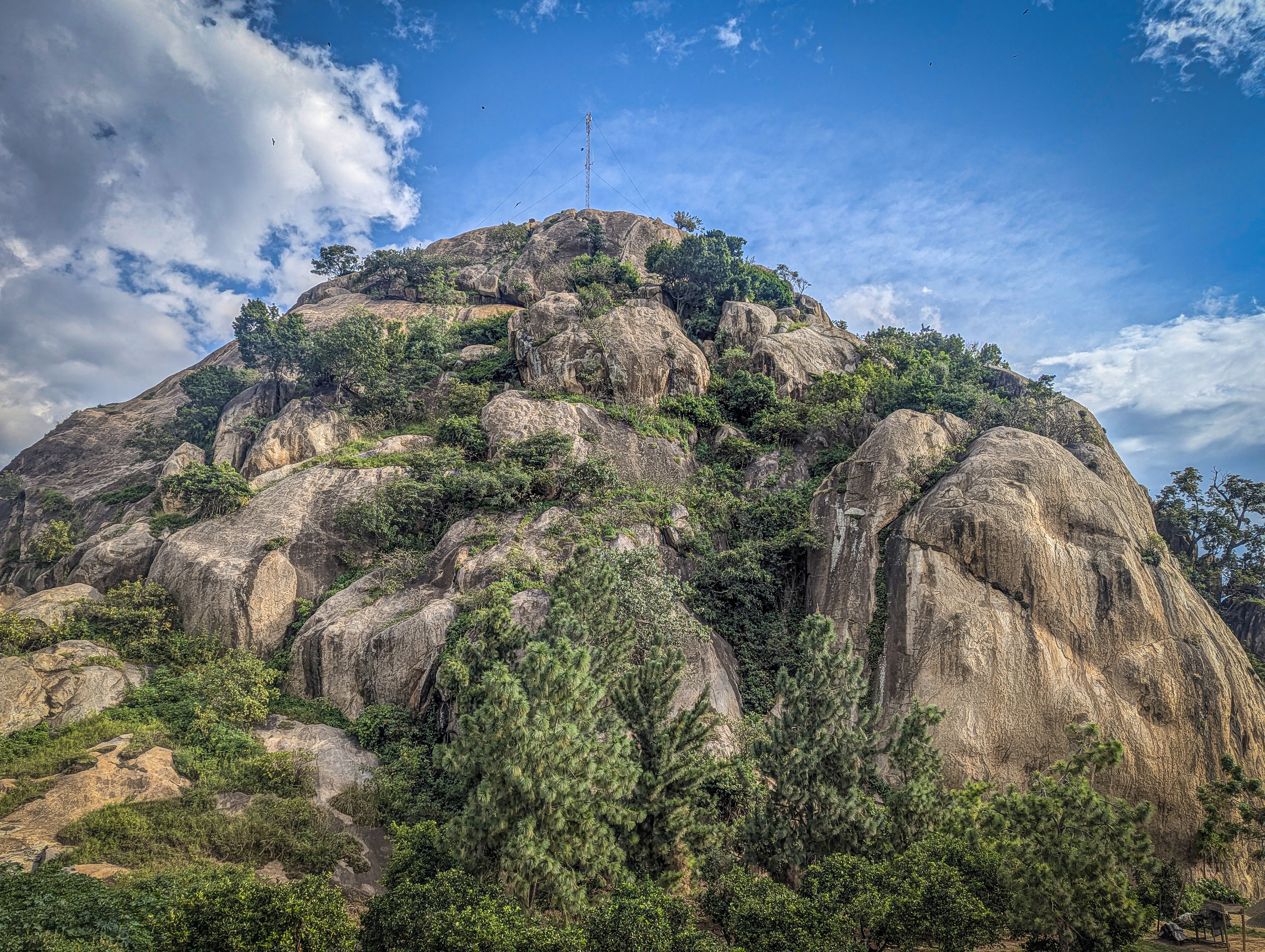

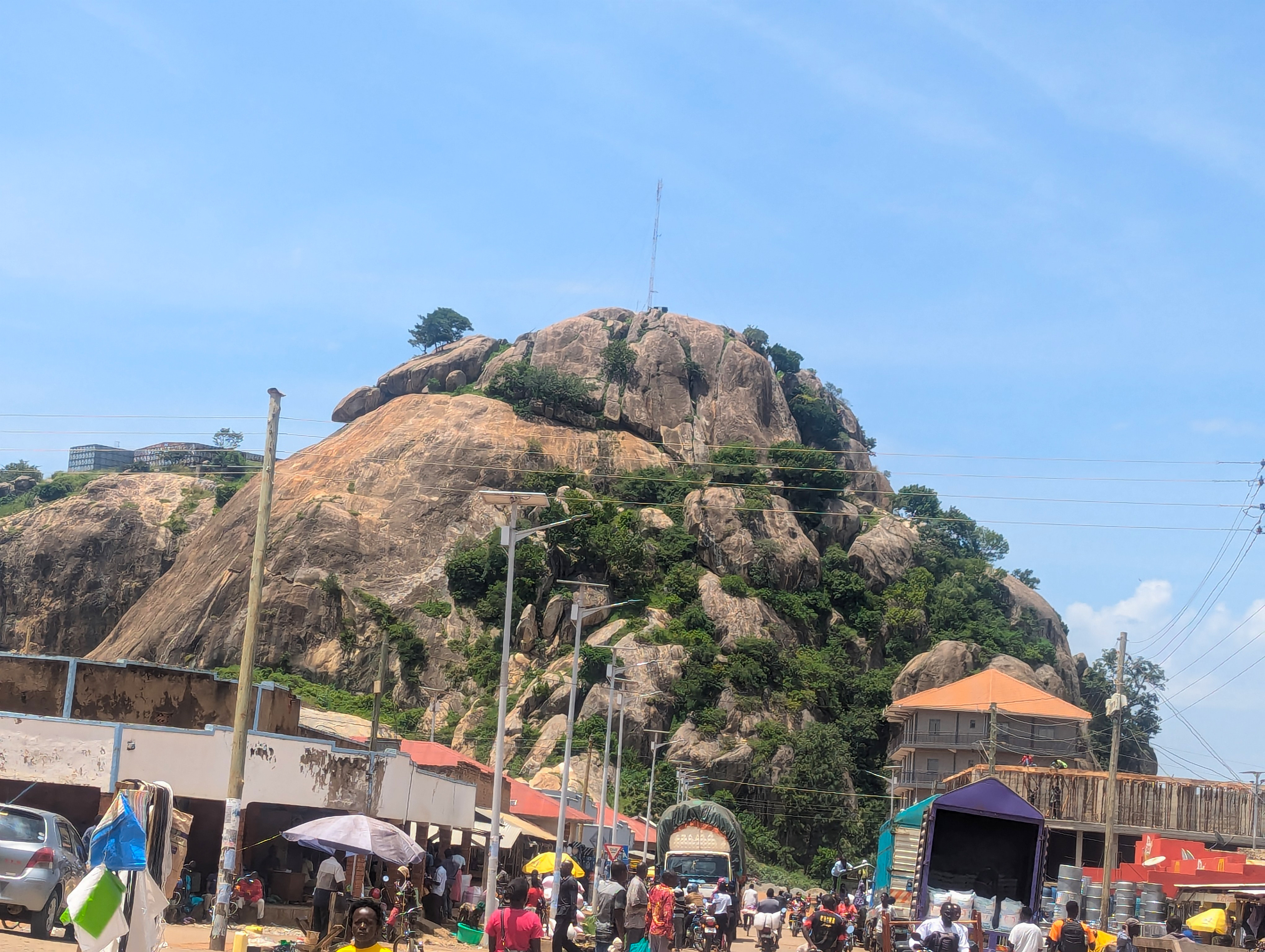

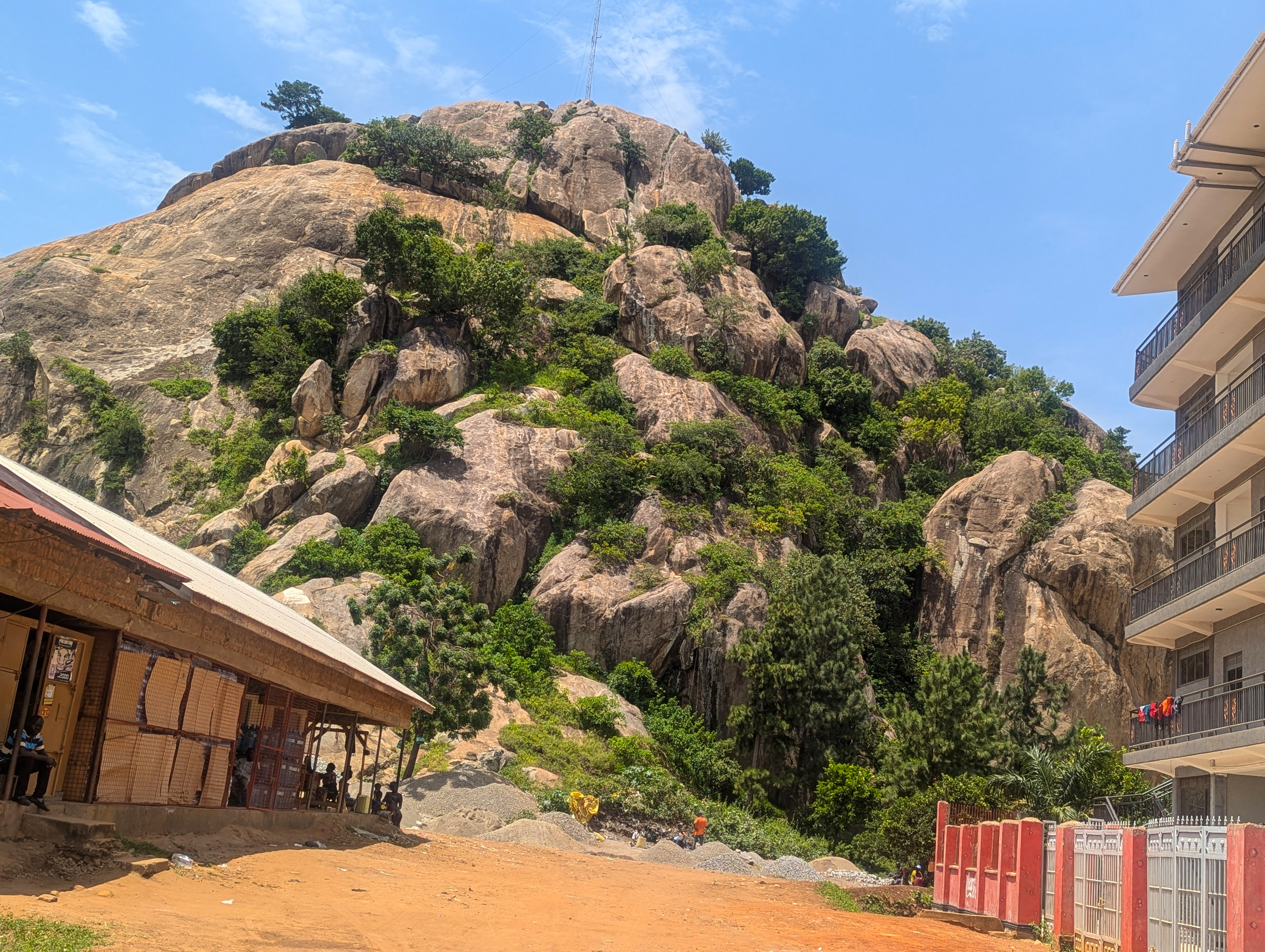

== Tourism ==
Soroti Rock is a local tourist attraction and is occasionally visited by travelers passing through the Teso region. Climbing the rock is possible, although there are no formal hiking trails or developed tourist facilities. The site is primarily valued for sightseeing, photography, and its cultural importance rather than organized tourism.

== See also ==
- Soroti
- Teso sub-region
- List of inselbergs
