= Soroti Fruits =

Agricultural processing company in Uganda

Coordinates: 01°46′32″N 33°37′05″E

Soroti Fruits Limited
- Company type: Public Private Partnership
- Industry: Manufacture & Distribution of Orange and Mango Juice
- Founded: 2014
- Headquarters: Arapai, Soroti, Uganda
- Key people: Julius Martin Ekomu; CEO
- Products: Fruit juice, fruit concentrate, packaged fruit
- Total assets: US$13.4 million (2019)
- Number of employees: 150 (2019)
- Website: www.softe.co.ug

Soroti Fruits Limited is a fruit and juice processing and distribution company of Uganda. It manages the Soroti Fruit Processing Factory, a fruit processing plant in Soroti, Uganda. The company is a public-private partnership, co-owned by the Ugandan government development agency Uganda Development Corporation and a Ugandan fruit growers cooperative union.

== History ==
=== Initiation ===
The government of Uganda, with the assistance of the Korea International Cooperation Agency (KOICA) and in partnership with the Teso Tropical Fruit Growers Cooperative Union (TETFGCU), decided to establish a fruit processing factory in Soroti District to take advantage of the abundant citrus crop in the Teso sub-region and its high yield per tree. The government provided the land, utilities, and infrastructure. and KOICA set aside US$7.4 million for equipment and training and built the factory. TETFGCU was to grow the fruit that the factory would process. Citrus fruit and mangoes were the principal fruits under consideration.

=== Factory development ===
Construction of the factory began in April 2015 and was scheduled to be completed in May 2016. Installing and commissioning the machinery and equipment was anticipated from August 2016 to October 2016. The factory was scheduled to commence commercial operation in November 2016.

After years of delay, the factory began test runs of its production lines in May 2018, with commercial commissioning planned for August 2018. Production is planned to be phased, starting with one 8-hour shift and gradually increasing to two and eventually three daily shifts.

Commercial production is expected to begin in April 2019. The factory has capacity to process six metric tonnes of fruit on a daily basis.

On 13 April 2019, president Yoweri Museveni launched commercial production at the completed factory. At the beginning, 150 employees were hired, with the expectation to increase to 250 people when the factory runs at maximum capacity.

In October 2019, the factory began producing mango juice under the label "Teju", short for "Teso Juice". It is expected that Teju will soon be served on the revived Uganda Airlines.

=== Privatization announcement ===
In September 2023, following years of commercial losses, the government of Uganda decided to privatize the juice factory. It is expected that a knowledgeable and experienced investor will be able solve three major stumbling blocks that the factory faces: (a) lack of cash to buy all the fruit that the farmers produce (b) failure to process in a timely manner all the fruit that is procured. The factory needs to automate and (c) failure to sell all the juice produced by the factory.

=== Move to direct producer procurements ===
During Q4 2023, in an effort to increase efficiency and profitability, management changed tactics and stopped procuring raw fruit from middlemen and started buying directly from the farmers. In addition, to incentivize the farmers, each farmer receives back 10 percent of the juice extracted from the fruit that he/she sells to the factory. It is not clear if the farmer receives actual fruit juice or the value of the juice in monetary payment.

== Ownership ==
The ownership of the factory is divided 80%-20% between the government-run Uganda Development Corporation and TETFGCU.

Soroti Fruit Processing Factory Stock Ownership
Rank	Name of Owner	Percentage Ownership
1	Uganda Development Corporation	80.0
2	Teso Tropical Fruit Growers Cooperative Union	20.0
	Total	100.00

== Factory location ==
The factory is located in Arapai Industrial Park, in Arapai sub-county, Soroti District, on the outskirts of the city of Soroti, approximately 299 kilometres (186 mi), by road, north-east of Kampala, Uganda's capital and largest city. The geographical coordinates of the fruit processing facility are: 01°46'32.0"N, 33°37'05.0"E (Latitude:1.775556; Longitude:33.618056).
