= Moroto Ateker Cement Company Limited =

Cement manufacturer in Uganda

Coordinates: 02°31′56″N 34°38′12″E

- Company type: Public-Private-Partnership
- Industry: Manufacture of construction materials
- Founded: March 16, 2016; 10 years ago
- Headquarters: Moroto, Uganda
- Products: Cement

The Moroto Ateker Cement Company Limited (MACCL) is a manufacturer of cement in Uganda.

== Location ==
The main factory and headquarters of the company are located in Moroto Industrial Park in Moroto Town, approximately 460 kilometres (286 mi), north-east of Kampala, Uganda's capital and largest city.

== Ownership ==
Moroto Ateker Cement Company Limited is a joint venture company between Savannah Mines Limited, a private company, and Uganda Development Corporation, a government parastatal. The shareholding in the shares of stock of the company, is as depicted in the table below.

Moroto Ateker Cement Company Limited Stock Ownership
Rank	Name of Owner	Percentage Ownership
1	Uganda Development Corporation	51.0
2	Savannah Mines Limited	49.0
	Total	100.0

== Construction ==
Saboo Technologies Limited of India carried out a feasibility study, to establish the costs, raw materials, and project longevity of production. According to their findings, the project is expected to cost US$225 million (Shs765 billion). Of this, about US$200 million (Shs680 billion) will be spent on plant and machinery and the remaining US$25 million (Shs85 billion), will be spent on operational expenses. The project will be developed in two phases.

UDC and Savannah Mines are looking towards awarding the construction contract to Saboo Technologies, based on Saboo's experience in building cement plants in Ethiopia and Djibouti. The project is awaiting approval from the Ugandan cabinet and from Uganda's parliament.

== See also ==
- List of cement manufacturers in Uganda
- List of companies and cities in Africa that manufacture cement
