= Nakivubo Pronouncement =

The Nakivubo Pronouncement (or Pronouncements, often shortened to NP) was a commitment issued by Milton Obote, of the ruling party of Uganda, the Uganda Peoples Congress, in 1970. It outlined the increased nationalisation of major industries as part of the move towards socialism described by the Common Man's Charter of 1969 (the "Move to the Left"). It was ultimately a failure insofar as it did not achieve the socialist ideal it was supposed to portray.

== Outline ==
On 1 May 1970, Obote issued the pronouncement, proclaiming that, with immediate effect, the government was to take control of 60% (up from at most 51%) of over 80 corporations in Uganda; they would now be run by state corporations, trade unions, municipal councils, and cooperative unions. The list included all banks, insurance companies, manufacturing and mining industries, plantations, oil companies, and transport undertakings in Uganda. The pronouncement added that a government monopoly would be enforced in Uganda's import-export markets with the exception of oil. Foreign investors were to be compensated out of the post-tax profits of the firms themselves over the next 15 years.

In reality, little preparation had been carried out, nor thought given to the pronouncement's consequences; it seems that the President did not even give the Cabinet any prior warning of his decision. The criteria for nationalisation were not made clear and there was great uncertainty as to whether the nationalisation exercise was complete. It was not even clear whether the nationalisation was supposed to complement the Africanisation of Uganda commerce or to re-prioritise it. The "governmental machine was thrown into the kind of incoherent muddle which became increasingly characteristic of the regime's final phase." Nationalisation had been widely anticipated, and given the uncertainty, foreign investors had been pulling their money out of the country rapidly with disastrous consequences for the economy. Taking advantage of Obote's unwillingness to have the state directly run the affected companies, multinationals, particularly Shell and BP, used threats and brought concerted pressure to bear on the government to reduce their stake and to compensate them "profits or no profits". The result was that nationalisation was never fully realised, and the government never took control of Uganda's major industries.

== World response ==
Even so, the move proved very unpopular on the world stage. Banks felt particularly aggrieved. They had been asked to reincorporate their Ugandan operations in Uganda; now the reasons for that became clear. The Chairman of Barclays Bank, Sir Frederick Seebohm, spoke for many affected companies when he remarked that:

No one questions the right of governments to nationalise within their territory... But to nationalise by instant decree and without any prior consultation is, to say the least, an unfriendly gesture which is not likely to create a feeling of confidence among potential foreign investors.

— Frederick Seebohm, Uganda Argus, 27 March 1971.

Whilst the banks could use their political clout to achieve a better settlement, local Asian firms which had none of the same sort of leverage were left deeply unhappy, and many threatened to leave. They feared the move was part of a long transition to remove them from whole lines of business. In this way, the pronouncement contributed to Asian support of Obote's overthrow by Idi Amin in 1971. It has also been suggested that the strong anti-foreign sentiments illustrated by the pronouncement helped motivate foreign support for Amin's coup; declassified papers seem to support this.

In any event, Amin disliked the socialist attitude demonstrated by his predecessor; the pronouncement was soon revoked and in some industries, the government refrained even from controlling stakes, though Africanisation was completed with the expulsion of Asians and later British holdings.
