= Patrick Birungi =

Ugandan economist

- Born: 1 January 1968 (age 58); Kabarole District, Uganda
- Citizenship: Uganda
- Education: Makerere University; Bachelor of Arts in Economics; University of Pretoria; Master of Science in Economics; Doctor of Philosophy in Economics
- Occupations: Economist, Academic and Corporate Executive
- Years active: 1992 to present
- Known for: Economics
- Title: Executive Director; Uganda Development Corporation

Patrick Bitonder Birungi is a Ugandan economist, academic and corporate executive, who serves as the executive director of Uganda Development Corporation (UDC), effective 4 April 2019. UDC is a Uganda government-owned company, established in 1952, that is mandated to promote investment in the country and to manage government-owned investments in private businesses and industries.

== Early life and education ==
Birungi was born on 1 January 1968 in the Toro sub-region. After attending local primary schools, he enrolled into Nyakasura School, a mixed, boarding, middle, and high school in Fort Portal, Kabarole District, in the Western Region of Uganda. He graduated from Nyakasura with a High School Diploma.

He obtained his first degree, a Bachelor of Arts in Economics, from Makerere University, the oldest and largest public university in Uganda. His second degree, a Master of Science in Economics was obtained from the University of Pretoria in South Africa. He also has a Doctor of Philosophy degree in Economics, also from the same university.

== Career ==
Starting in the 1990s, Birungi worked as an economist in various roles, including with the National Drug Authority. From 1992 until 2008, he lectured at Makerere University, rising to the position of Senior Lecturer, by the time he left. For a three year period, between 2007 and 2010, he was the National Economist for Uganda, at the United Nations Development Programme (UNDP).

Prior to his current position, he spent nearly nine years at the National Planning Authority of Uganda, serving there as the Director of Development Planning.

While there, he was directly involved in the formulation of the National Development Plan I (2010–2015) and the National Development Plan II (2015–2020).

== See also ==
- Emmanuel Tumusiime-Mutebile
- Louis Kasekende
- Economy of Uganda
