= Amina Moghe Hersi =

Somali entrepreneur (born 1964)

Amina Hersi Moghe
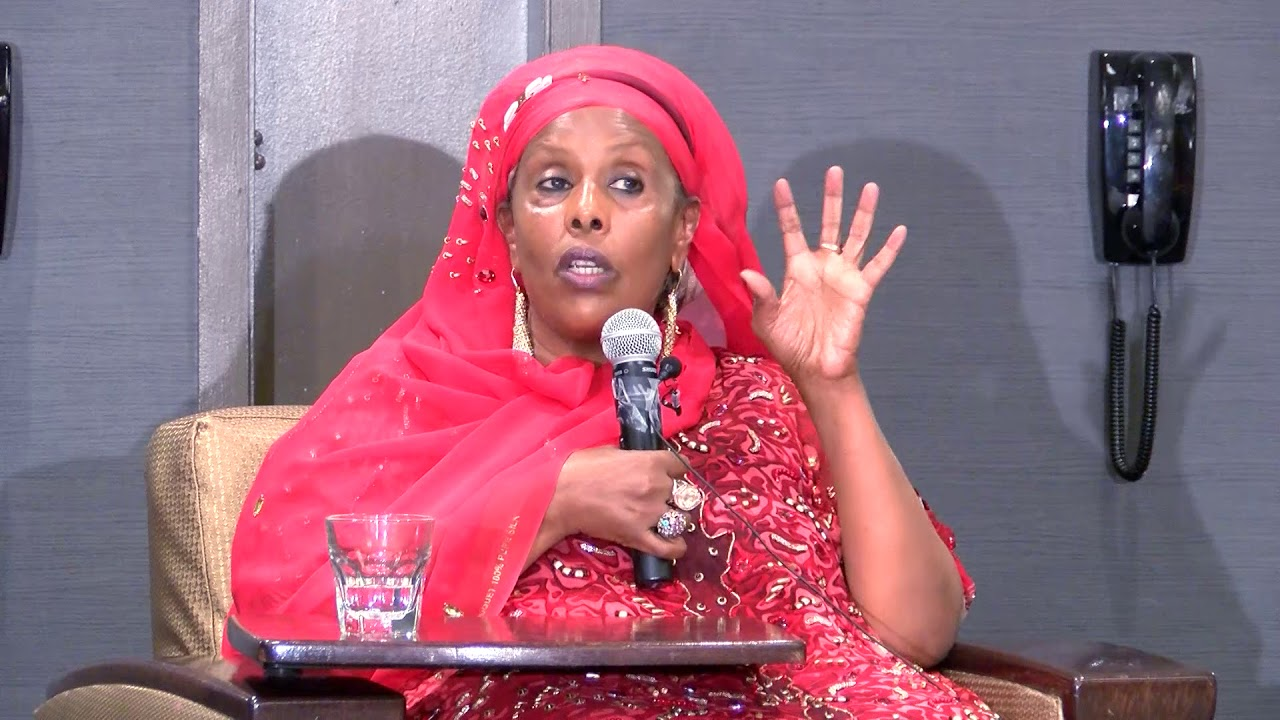
- Born: 27 September 1964 (age 61)
- Occupation: Entrepreneur
- Known for: Oasis Shopping Mall; Laburnam Courts Apartments; Atiak Sugar Factory; Kingstone Enterprises Limited

Amina Hersi Moghe (Somali: Aamina Xirsi Mooge, Arabic: أمينة موجي هرسي) (born 1964) is a Somali entrepreneur. She has launched several multimillion-dollar projects in Kampala, Uganda. Her investments include Oasis Shopping Mall in Kampala's central business district and the Laburnam Courts Apartments, on Nakasero Hill adjacent to State House Kampala. She in the process of launching the first sugar factory in Northern Uganda. Atiak sugar factory will not only bring revenue and development for the region but is championed as the first large scale industrial project for Northern Uganda. She is also one of the city's largest distributors of cement and other hardware materials. With successful business ventures throughout Uganda she has become a beacon of hope and a motivating role model for young African girls.

== Biography ==
Amina was born in Bungoma, Western Kenya, where her mother, Sarah Hersi Ali, is a businesswoman. Adam Hersi Ali, her uncle, who was another figure in Amina's life, served as a Financial Secretary of Treasury in the Kenya's Ministry of Finance in the late 1980s. As a young girl, Moghe and her sister regularly joined their family in the cross-border trade between Kenya and Uganda. The two girls were sent to accounting school by their mother, where they built on their entrepreneurial skills. Having a strong entrepreneurial mother led her to be business savvy not afraid of making big business risks. Her biggest risk was closing her successful hardware store in Bungoma and venturing in a startup business in Uganda after the stabilisation of the country in 1996. With no foundation set for her she used the skills she was taught to set up a hardware store in the city of Kampala, Uganda.

== Career ==
"It was a pleasant surprise and I'm grateful for the recognition. The award has really inspired me to do more in the coming years," – Amina Moghe Hersi.

Moghe quickly adapted to her new environment and acted as a convenient link on the ground for her family's commercial trade. She began expanding the family business and entered the real estate sector. Moghe would eventually become one of the wealthiest people in Uganda and come to own the Oasis Centre, a multimillion-dollar shopping mall complex and grand scale luxurious apartment Laburnam Courts that are both situated in the center of the capital. She also runs one of the largest distributors of cement and other hardware materials in the country. In 2008, Amina received the Woman Investor of the year Award for her large-scale projects that are changing Kampala's skyline.

== Investment portfolio ==
As of February 2018, Hersi organizes her investments under the company known as Horiyal-Investments-Holding Company Limited. These investments include, but are not limited to the following:

- Oasis Mall, Kampala
- Nakumatt Mall, Kampala
- Laburnam Apartments, Kampala
- Atiak Sugar Factory
- Rabo Enterprises Limited
- Kingstone Enterprises Limited
- Kingstone Namanve LCD.

== Recent developments ==
In 2016, Amina Hersi Moghe via her investment company, Horyal Investment Holding Company Limited began construction of Atiak Sugar Factory, in Atiak, Amuru District, Northern Uganda. The US$120 million project is expected to be ready in 2016, with commercial production expected in 2017. This factory will be the first large scale industrial project in Northern Uganda. With the biggest benefactors being women who are working in conjunction with Amina in the factory's development, primarily as sugar-cane outgrowers and main distributors of the final product once production begins. Over 6,000 women in the region are expected to benefit directly and indirectly from the project.

== See also ==
- Somali diaspora
