= Uganda Broadcasting Corporation =

Public broadcaster network

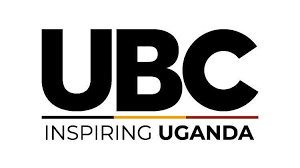
- Type: Television (since 1963); Radio (since 1953)
- Branding: UBC
- Country: Uganda
- Availability: National
- Founded: 8 October 1963; 62 years ago by Government of Uganda
- Headquarters: Broadcast House, 17/19 Nile Avenue, Kampala, Uganda
- Parent: Uganda Ministry of Information and Communications Technology
- Launch date: October 8, 1963
- Former names: Radio Uganda (1954-2006); Uganda Television (UTV; 1963-2006)
- Picture format: 720p (HDTV)
- Affiliates: Magic 1, Star TV, Bryan Morel Publications, U24 and Ugospel.
- Official website: ubc.go.ug
- Language: English

Uganda Broadcasting Corporation (UBC) is the public broadcaster network of Uganda. It was founded as a result of the "Uganda Broadcasting Corporation Act, 2004", which merged the operations of Uganda Television (UTV) and Radio Uganda. It started broadcasting on November 16, 2005.

The Uganda Broadcasting Corporation Act stated that the UBC should be funded by the levying of a television licence fee. Collection of a licence fee set at USh 20,000/= (around €8.40 or US$10.80) started in 2005. However, collection was subsequently halted by President Yoweri Museveni. There has since been pressure to reinstate the licence fee to maintain UBC's independence. UBC operates the UBC TV channel and five radio stations.

Until May 2011, Edward Musinguzi was the managing director. He was fired along with all of the governing board for "massive corruption" involving unpaid salaries, the sale of land owned by the corporation, and advertisements sold during the 2010 World Cup.

== Location ==
The broadcast studios and main offices of UBC are located at plot 17–19 Nile Avenue, Nakasero Hill, in Kampala, Uganda's capital and largest city. The geographic coordinates of Uganda Broadcasting Corporation headquarters are: 0°18'59.0"N, 32°35'21.0"E (Latitude:0.316389; Longitude:32.589167).

== History ==
=== Radio Uganda ===
The British colonial administration set up the Uganda Broadcasting Service in 1954. The primary goal was to support the colonial agenda of the then-current government. The station primarily broadcast news from the external service of the BBC and other programmes. UBS was also instrumental in silencing the pro-independence movement at the time. After independence, UBS was renamed Radio Uganda. Up until the 1980s, both radio and television units were seen as government mouthpieces.

=== Uganda Television ===
In 1963, a year after the independence of Uganda, Uganda Television service was set up. Much like the Uganda Broadcasting Service that came before, the station was built with European engineers. The station was initially housed at the Nakasero facilities, that were later demolished to make room for a Hilton hotel. Bob Astles was appointed head of the outside broadcast unit in 1963, a position he held until 1971 when Idi Amin took over the government. Amin wanted Astles to continue working for UTV, but was subsequently refused as Astles supported Obote and was subsequently jailed.

Idi Amin's rule oversaw massive changes to Uganda Television, which was his first target. UTV was already a propaganda tool for the Obote government, something that was heavily retooled under the new leader. Network head Aggrey Awori was beaten up and fled to Kenya; his deputee James Bwogi took his place. He demanded to reform the broadcaster with the aim of introducing current affairs programmes reflective of his plan to make UTV a medium of discussion. Thanks to his reorganisation, UTV started housing opinions from "an increasing number of people", often showing opinions that never pleased Amin. Subsequently, he was abducted and Amin reformulated UTV again. The main news lasted for one hour, in four languages, English, Swahili, French and Arabic, per a presidential decree, even though French and Arabic were never official languages in the country.

UTV was being tested in 2005 for addition on DStv.

=== Passage of the UBC Act and early years of the new corporation ===
The new UBC was formally launched on 19 April 2006 under the new corporate tagline "Bigger, Better". The channel was also made available on the JumpTV platform shortly after, aiming at the diaspora.

=== Re-organization ===
When he assumed office in 2016, Frank Tumwebaze, the Information and ICT Minister, established an ad-hoc committee to look into the affairs of the broadcaster. The ad-hoc committee found that UBC was in debt and had too many employees, whom it paid poorly and utilized them sub-optimally, among other infractions.

A team was set up to address the short-comings. The pay-roll was reduced from 525 to 349 people. To weed out the 176 who need to be let go, all 525 members of staff were instructed to re-apply, if interested. Those who opt for retirement or early retirement would be provided with appropriate retirement packages.

The changes, which were expected to take effect starting July 2018, were projected to reduce the wage bill from USh 4.5 billion (approximately US$1.25 million) annually to USh 3.5 billion (approximately US$955,000).

In October 2018, the company hired Maurice Mugisha, formerly "Head of News Production" at NTV Uganda, to serve as its new Deputy Managing Director.

== Operations ==
The Uganda Broadcasting Corporation owns five radio stations, three of them general and two of them exclusively over FM (Star FM in Luganda and Magic FM which started in mid-2008). The three core networks were the Red network (North/West Nile, in English, Alur, Kakwa, Kinubi, Lugbara, Madi and Luo), the Blue network (Central/Southern, in Runyoro-Rutoro, Luganda, Rwamba, Rukonzo, Urufumbira and Ruruli) and the Butebo network (East/Northeast, in Lusoka, Nyakarimojong, Ateso, Kumam, Lumasaba, Lunyole-Lusamia, Lugwe, Adhola, Kupsabiny and Lugwere). These networks are grouped according to the primary languages spoken in their respective areas.

UBC operates one television channel, UBC TV. As of the late 2000s, the channel's terrestrial network was received in 60% of the country, the widest coverage compared to its private competitors.
