= Chief of Defence Staff (Rwanda) =

Highest-ranked officer in the Rwanda military

Chief of the Defence Staff
- Umugaba Mukuru w’Ingabo z’u Rwanda (Kinyarwanda)
- Incumbent; General Mubarak Muganga since 5 June 2023
- Rwanda Defence Force
- Reports to: Minister of Defence
- Appointer: The president
- Formation: April 1992
- First holder: Déogratias Nsabimana
- Website: Official website

The Chief of Defence Staff is the highest-ranked officer in the Rwanda Defence Force and is responsible for maintaining control over the branches of the military.

== List of officeholders ==
=== Chiefs of staff (1992–1994) ===
No.	Portrait	Name (born–died)	Term of office			Ref.
No.	Portrait	Name (born–died)	Took office	Left office	Time in office	Ref.
1		Major general Déogratias Nsabimana (1945–1994)	April 1992	6 April 1994 †	2 years	
2		Colonel; Marcel Gatsinzi (1948–2023)	7 April 1994	17 April 1994	10 days	
3		Major general Augustin Bizimungu (born 1952)	17 April 1994	July 1994	2 months	

=== Chiefs of defence staff (1994–present) ===
No.	Portrait	Name (born–died)	Term of office			Ref.
No.	Portrait	Name (born–died)	Took office	Left office	Time in office	Ref.
1		Major general Sam Kanyemera	1994	1998	3–4 years	
2		Lieutenant general Faustin Kayumba Nyamwasa (born 1962)	February 1998	November 2001	3 years	
3		General; James Kabarebe (born 1959)	November 2001	10 April 2010	8 years, 5 months	
4		Lieutenant general Charles Kayonga (born 1962)	13 April 2010	23 June 2013	3 years, 83 days	
5		General; Patrick Nyamvumba (born 1967)	23 June 2013	4 November 2019	6 years, 134 days	
6		General; Jean Bosco Kazura	4 November 2019	5 June 2023	3 years, 213 days	
7		general Mubarak Muganga (born 1967)	5 June 2023	Incumbent	3 years, 154 days	
