= Battle of Kisangani (1999) =

- Part of the Second Congo War
Date	7–17 August 1999
Location	Kisangani, Democratic Republic of the Congo
Result	Rwandan victory

Belligerents
Rwanda; Burundi; RCD–Goma	Uganda; RCD–Kisangani

Commanders and leaders
(Rwanda) James Kabarebe (Rwanda) Patrick Nyamvumba; RCD Jean-Pierre Ondekane; RCD Amuli Kalangala (POW)	(Uganda) James Kazini; RCD Ernest Wamba dia Wamba

Strength
(Rwanda) 4,500+ (Burundi) 4,000; RCD Unknown	(Uganda) Unknown; RCD 1,500

Casualties and losses
Unknown	(Uganda) ~30 killed
- At least 200 killed and 600 injured

The Battle of Kisangani broke out between the allies Rwanda and Uganda in August 1999 while they were backing rival rebel groups in the Democratic Republic of the Congo (DRC) during the Second Congo War. When the war broke out with the Rwandan- and Ugandan-backed Banyamulenge rebellion in August 1998, the city of Kisangani was overrun by rebels during the first weeks. The Rally for Congolese Democracy (RCD) movement later splintered between two factions, with a new group in Kisangani that supported the Lusaka peace process and was anti-Tutsi, while the other, based in Goma, refused to join the peace accords and was aligned with Rwanda.

Fighting broke out between rival factions in Kisangani on 7 August 1999 when RCD–Kisangani was holding a political rally, and the Uganda People's Defence Force (UPDF) supported it with back up. The fighting lasted until 9 August, when negotiations between the UPDF and Rwandan Patriotic Army (RPA) commanders achieved a temporary ceasefire. The battle was not initially between UPDF and RPA troops. However, on 14 August, fighting broke out again, this time between the two armies at Kisangani's main airport, as both countries were flying in reinforcements. Rwanda's ally Burundi later sent troops that fought alongside the RPA. Ugandan President Yoweri Museveni and Rwandan Vice President Paul Kagame achieved a lasting ceasefire on 17 August after negotiations, and also agreed to get both RCD factions to commit to the Lusaka agreement, which RCD–Goma did on 24 August.

Rwanda was left in control of most of the city, and a total of 200 people were reportedly killed during the battle. Many Congolese civilians fled the city into the jungle. The UPDF moved its headquarters in the DRC from Kisangani further west to Gbadolite, and RCD–Kisangani moved to Bunia, closer to the Ugandan border. A joint police force was established in Kisangani that included troops from both sides of the battle. The Lusaka Peace Agreement did not lead to a broader ceasefire, however, and the war continued. Fighting in Kisangani between the Rwandan and Ugandan armies broke out again in May 2000, and on a larger scale in June 2000.

== Background ==
Rwanda and Uganda were some of the closest allies in Africa. Rwandan Vice President Paul Kagame had previously served as Ugandan President Yoweri Museveni's chief of intelligence during the Ugandan Civil War, and Museveni later supported Kagame's Rwandan Patriotic Front when it stopped the Rwandan genocide in 1994. When the Second Congo War broke out in August 1998, the city of Kisangani, Orientale Province, Democratic Republic of the Congo (DRC), saw fighting between government troops and rebels that were aligned with the Rwandan-backed Banyamulenge rebellion that began in the Kivus. The Kisangani uprising in early August 1998 was defeated by the government, which then used Kisangani Airport to bring reinforcements and supplies to the broader region. However, the Kivus were overrun by Rwandan- and later Ugandan-backed rebels. Kisangani, the country's northeastern economic hub and third largest city, was captured by rebels forces on 23 August 1998, during their advance through the eastern DRC.

By the start of August 1999, Kisangani and Orientale Province had been cut off from river transportation to government-controlled Kinshasa, and shipping cargo by air from Uganda was too expensive. This prevented supplies from reaching the city's residents, who were living on one meal a day and were getting limited nutrition. The region was also experiencing political volatility, including a split within the rebel movement Rally for Congolese Democracy. RCD–Kisangani, led by Ernest Wamba dia Wamba, was in favor of the Lusaka Peace Agreement and was anti-Tutsi; it broke away from Emile Ilunga's pro-Rwandan RCD–Goma. The Ugandan-backed Movement for the Liberation of the Congo (MLC) was also present in the province. The rebels were unpopular among the residents of Kisangani, who had started recovering from the effects of the First Congo War when the second conflict broke out.

== Course of the battle ==
Fighting between broke out in Kisangani's airport on 7 August 1999 between the Uganda People's Defence Force (UPDF), which supported the Kisangani faction of the RCD, and the Rwandan-backed mainstream RCD, which attacked Ugandan troops and their Congolese rivals. Rwandan Patriotic Army (RPA) troops supported the mainstream faction. Combat broke out in the city center and at two airports as RCD–Goma disrupted a "tour of explanation" by RCD–Kisangani to explain the Lusaka Peace Agreement. The battle was also described as an attempt to prevent a Zambian delegation from flying into the city to see the level of support for Wamba and RCD–Kisangani, and it did close the airports. On 9 August, the commanding officers of the opposing forces, James Kazini of the UPDF and Patrick Nyamvumba of the RPA, met to discuss the situation and ordered a ceasefire. Kazini claimed that he was in control of Kisangani. RCD–Goma vice president and military commander Jean-Pierre Ondekane claimed that the Ugandan military was creating a political space for Wamba's RCD–Kisangani, and that Uganda's actions were part of a series of "provocations" against the group, such as turning the Ituri District of Orientale into a new province. The Zambian delegation left the DRC, having failed to meet Wamba due to the battle in Kisangani.

At least 14 people were killed in the first clashes. Thousands of Kisangani residents went into the streets and cheered for Wamba, who had support due to his advocacy for negotiations with the Congolese government. Civilians also jeered at Amuli Kalangala, an RCD–Goma commander who was captured, when he was paraded through the streets. Tensions remained high after the initial fighting stopped on 9 August. There had not been fighting between RPA and UPDF troops, and they remained cordial while the city was partitioned to separate the rival RCD factions. During the break in the fighting, South African Foreign Minister Nkosazana Zuma was able to visit the city to hold discussions the RCD's rival leaders, from 11 to 12 August. Her mission was on behalf of the Zambian President Frederick Chiluba, who had been given the role of leading the DRC peace efforts by the Southern African Development Community (SADC). Zuma's trip was to get the two rival groups to both sign on to the Lusaka agreement. The fighting also disrupted preparations for the DRC's national polio vaccination campaign, preventing vaccines from being flown into Kisangani.

Fighting broke out again between Ugandan and Rwandan army troops at Kisangani's main airport on 14 August. About 400 UPDF reinforcements were flown in and ordered to surround RPA positions at the airport, which had been previously shared between the two armies. Another account stated that the Rwandans opened fire at Ugandan troops as they tried to position themselves between the UPDF headquarters and the airport, and that 4,500 reinforcements had been flown in by Rwanda. They faced 1,500 RCD–Kisangani supporters and an unspecified amount of UPDF troops. Water and electricity in Kisangani were cut on 15 August, while the city's residents were holed up in their homes or at hospitals (that some of them went to during the polio vaccination campaign). Burundi reportedly flew in 4,000 troops to fight alongside the Rwandans, despite officially denying it. Ugandan military sources claimed that Rwandan shelling on 15 and 16 August targeted parts of Kisangani where they believed Wamba to be. The RPA shelled Wamba's hotel and then moved in, though Wamba was able to escape. Dozens of civilians were killed by artillery.

The fighting reportedly intensified on 16 August. DRC Health Minister Leonard Mashako Mamba condemned the fighting, claiming that it caused three million polio vaccines to spoil because of the power cut. The fierce fighting between the RPA and UPDF resulted in Rwanda taking key positions in the city, but Uganda launched a new offensive. Most of the fighting centered on three hotels, a local bank, and a prison. US President Bill Clinton sent his national security advisor on Africa, Gayle Smith, to meet with President Museveni and Vice President Kagame. The two of them established a joint command post on 16/17 August to prevent the situation from escalating further. On 17 August, the two heads of state agreed on a ceasefire and to stop engaging in "verbal battles in the media" from government officials. They also affirmed their commitment to secure the rebels' acceptance of the Lusaka agreement and to cooperate with the ceasefire verification observers. By then, Rwanda and RCD–Goma controlled most of the city.

== Aftermath ==
=== Casualties and impact ===
After the battle, at least 34 soldiers were killed, and 600 people were injured. Many of the city's residents fled into the jungle to avoid the fighting. Reportedly, at least 50 Congolese civilians were also killed. Reuters reported that 200 people had been killed. The UPDF admitted that about 30 soldiers had been killed. A Ugandan intelligence officer was quoted as saying that neither the UPDF nor the RPA knew how many casualties they had taken. Life in the city was returning to normal after the ceasefire, with Rwanda in control of most of it despite the ceasefire agreement calling for all sides to return to their previous positions. Uganda controlled Kisangani's main airport while Rwanda controlled the smaller airport.

Human Rights Watch condemned the "callous disregard" for civilians shown by both armies. Humanitarian organizations including the International Committee of the Red Cross, UNICEF, and NGOs visited Kisangani in late August, reporting that although "physical damage" was limited, with hospitals, food reserves, water supply and treatment facilities remaining intact, the disruption to air traffic caused shortages of supplies. When the mission reported the results of their visit to DRC President Laurent-Désiré Kabila, he gave his full support for their humanitarian work, including in rebel-controlled territories. Up to 70% of Kisangani residents were covered by the polio vaccination campaign despite the battle. There was a cholera outbreak in Kisangani in mid-September that caused 23 deaths. As of December 1999, half of Kisangani's population was reported to be in need of humanitarian assistance, as they were affected by malnutrition.

=== Reactions ===
Ugandan and Rwandan soldiers in Kisangani became cordial again after the fighting. On 19 August, UPDF commander Maj. Gen. Jeje Odongo and RPA chief of staff Brig. Gen. Kayumba Nyamwasa arrived in Kisangani to take over from their respective subordinates, UPDF chief of staff James Kazini and RPA chief of DRC operations James Kabarebe. They were tasked with implementing the ceasefire, and with investigating the circumstances that caused the battle and making recommendations on how to resolve the crisis. The result of their work, the "Report of the UPDF/RPA Joint Inquiry into the Incidents Between 6 and 17 August 1999 in Kisangani," concluded that Uganda was largely responsible for causing the battle, but Uganda refused to accept that conclusion. On 17 September, the UPDF set up its own committee to investigate the battle. Museveni said on 27 September that he would send a letter to his Rwandan counterpart, Pasteur Bizimungu, based on the conclusions of the UPDF committee, and that the UPDF/RPA joint inquiry may need to address Uganda's concerns.

Troops from both countries began withdrawing from Kisangani to other locations in the DRC on 6 September, with the UPDF heading northeast towards Bafwasende and the RPA heading southeast. Kabarebe, the Rwandan commander in the DRC, was removed from his post after the battle, and was later appointed the RPA deputy chief of staff. Kazini, the commander of the UPDF troops in the DRC, moved his headquarters from Kisangani to Gbadolite in the northwest. Wamba moved the headquarters of his RCD faction to Bunia, which was closer to the Ugandan border and had a larger UPDF troop presence. In early October, Kisangani residents protested at a meeting with the city's governor, calling for the end of both Rwandan and Ugandan intervention in their affairs, the implementation of the Lusaka agreement, and the presence of UN observers to end the "looting" of resources in the Eastern DRC. On 8 October, RCD–Goma formed a police force in Kisangani with members from both sides, including Ugandan and Rwandan troops.

The DRC's permanent representative to the UN claimed that the fighting between Uganda and Rwanda was to control resources in the region around Kisangani. Members of the Ugandan parliament questioned the legality of the Ugandan presence in the DRC after the battle and demanded casualty figures from the government. On 18 August, a parliamentary committee requested that President Yoweri Museveni give a national address on the situation in the DRC. Museveni denied reports that Uganda wanted to militarily control Kisangani on 24 August, proposing several explanations for the outbreak of fighting, including an attempt to assassinate Wamba. He said that the UPDF was present there to protect Wamba and guarantee access to the city for Zambian and South African mediators. On 27 August, the Rwandan government and the Ugandan embassy in Kigali denied reports in the Ugandan media that Ugandans in the Rwandan capital were being harassed after the Kisangani battle. On 25 August, Burundi's government denied claims by the Ugandan press that Burundian troops fought alongside the Rwandans in Kisangani. The Burundian embassy in South Africa claimed that the accusation was made to damage relations between Burundi and Uganda.

RCD–Goma leaders announced their intention to sign the Lusaka agreement on 24 August, joining RCD–Kisangani in supporting it. A total of fifty founding members of the RCD (who were mostly loyal to Ilunga's Goma faction, except for six loyal to Wamba's Kisangani faction) signed the Lusaka Peace Agreement on 31 August. The agreement called for a ceasefire within 24 hours, to be monitored by a Joint Military Commission. However, the Lusaka agreement did not lead to the implementation of a ceasefire in the DRC, and the war continued. Fighting between Uganda and Rwanda in Kisangani occurred again on 5 May 2000, and on a larger scale during the Six-Day War of June 2000.
