= Albert Murasira =

Rwandan politician and military officer

Major General Albert Murasira

Minister of Defense
- In office 18 October 2018 – 6 June 2023
- President: Paul Kagame
- Preceded by: James Kabarebe
- Succeeded by: Juvenal Marizamunda

Personal details
- Born: 11 November 1962 (age 63) Maniema Province, Democratic Republic of the Congo
- Party: Rwanda Patriotic Front
- Spouse: Marie-Goretti Rafiki
- Education: National University of Rwanda

Major General Albert Murasira (born 11 November 1962), is a Rwandan politician and a retired military officer who served as Minister of Defense in the Rwandan cabinet, from 18 October 2018, until 6 June 2023.

Before that, from February 2012 until October 2018, he was the Chief Executive Officer of Zigama Credit and Savings Bank, a licensed cooperative bank, for members of the Rwandan Defence Forces.

== Early life and education ==
Albert Murasira was born to Rwandese parents in Maniema Province, Democratic Republic of the Congo, on 11 November 1962. He attended primary school and middle school in Maniema Province, DR Congo. He completed his high school at the Byimana School of Sciences in Rwanda, matriculating in 1983, from Byimana School of Sciences in Ruhango District, Southern Province in 1983.

The same year, he was admitted to the National University of Rwanda (NUR), where he graduated with a Bachelor of Science in Mathematics, in 1986. Two years later he was awarded a Master of Science degree in Mathematics, also by the NUR. His MSc in Project Management was obtained from the University of Liverpool in the United Kingdom.

He has a Postgraduate Diploma in Public Administration, obtained from the Ghana Institute of Management and Public Administration in 2004. He also has a Diploma in Defence and Strategic Studies, obtained in 2011, from the PLA National Defence University in Beijing, China.

== Career ==
Murasira is a professional military officer, and a serving member of the Rwandan Defense Forces. He joined the Rwanda military in 1988 and was commissioned in 1989. He has attended a series of military courses, from the Officer Cadet Course up to Defense Strategic Studies. He also has served in various leadership and command positions in the Rwandan military.

He was a visiting lecturer in mathematics in the Faculty of Applied Sciences, at the National University of Rwanda (now University of Rwanda), from 1995 until 1998. He then served as the Director of Planning in the Ministry of Defense, from 1999 until 2004.

For one year, ending in December 2005, he was a Staff Officer in the African Union Mission in Sudan (AMIS), responsible for Information Technology in the Communication and Information System Department. He then spent the next one year, serving as the Deputy Commandant of Rwanda Military Academy, in Gako, Bugesera District, in Southern Province, Rwanda.

For the five years ending February 2012, he was serving as Chief of Joint General Staff responsible for Administration and Human Resource Management in the Rwandan Defense Forces. From February 2012 until October 2018, he was chief executive officer of Zigama Credit and Saving Society.

On Thursday 18 October 2018, Major General Albert Murasira was named the 10th Minister for Defense since Rwanda became independent in 1962, replacing General James Kabarebe, who was appointed special adviser on security matters to the President of Rwanda.

On Tuesday 6 June 2023, the President of Rwanda reshuffled the cabinet, replacing Major General Albert Murasira with Juvenal Marizamunda.

Political offices
Preceded by James Kabarebe	Minister of Defence (Rwanda); 18 October 2018 – 6 June 2023	Succeeded by Juvenal Marizamunda
