= Battle of Kisangani =

Battle of Kisangani may refer to:

- Battle of Kisangani (1997), during the First Congo War
- Battle of Kisangani (1999), during the Second Congo War
- Six-Day War (2000), which occurred in Kisangani during the larger Second Congo War
