= China–Rwanda relations =

- China: Rwanda

Diplomatic mission
- Chinese Embassy, Kigali: Rwandan Embassy, Beijing

Envoy
- Ambassador Gao Wenqi: Ambassador James Kimonio

China–Rwanda relations refer to the foreign relations between China and Rwanda. China and Rwanda established diplomatic relations on November 12, 1971. China has an embassy in Kigali, while Rwanda has an embassy in Beijing.

== Economic relations ==
Following the Rwandan genocide, China provided Rwanda with $20 million in financial aid, $10 million worth of humanitarian relief, and dispatched medical teams to assist in local relief efforts in Rwanda.

China subsequently expanded its support to Rwanda under the auspices of the Forum on China-Africa Cooperation.

From 2000 to 2011, there were approximately 56 Chinese official development finance projects identified in Rwanda through various media reports. These projects range from a US$160 million debt cancellation in 2007, to financing the construction and operationalization of the cement factory (CIMERWA) at Bugarama in 2009, and an interest-free, 219 million RMB loan for the rehabilitation of the Kigali road network in 2009.

As China began a new town construction boom around 2010, the Chinese government and state-owned enterprises began developing new towns with African governments, including Rwanda.

In 2012, Rwandan President Paul Kagame stated that China's investment in African infrastructure meets the needs of Africa and has been well received by governments and private enterprises.

Rwanda joined the Belt and Road Initiative (BRI) in 2018.

== Sovereignty issues ==
Rwanda follows the one China principle. It recognizes the People's Republic of China as the sole government of China and Taiwan as an integral part of China's territory, and supports all efforts by the PRC to "achieve national reunification". It also considers Hong Kong, Xinjiang and Tibet to be China's internal affairs.
