= Habyarimana (surname) =

Habyarimana is a Rwandan surname. Notable people with the surname include:

- Juvénal Habyarimana (1937–1994), president of Rwanda 1973–1994
- Agathe Habyarimana (née Kanziga, born 1942), wife of Juvénal Habyarimana
- Emmanuel Habyarimana, former Rwandan Minister of Defence
