= Juvenal Marizamunda =

Rwandan general and politician

Brigadier General Juvenal Marizamunda

Minister of Defense
- Incumbent
- Assumed office 6 June 2023
- President: Paul Kagame

Personal details
- Born: 2 December 1965 (age 60) Nyamagabe District, Southern Province, Rwanda
- Party: Rwandan Patriotic Front
- Spouse: Seraphine Nyirasafari

Brigadier General Juvenal Marizamunda (born 2 December 1965), is a Rwandan politician and military officer who serves as Minister of Defense in the Rwandan cabinet since 6 June 2023.

Before that, from April 2021 until June 2023, he served as the Commissioner General for Rwanda Correctional Service (RCS). Prior to that, from June 2014 until April 2021, he was the Deputy Commissioner General of Rwanda National Police in charge of Administration and Finance.

== Early life and education ==
Juvenal Marizamunda was born on 2 December 1965, in Nyamagabe District, in Rwanda's Southern Province. He has had diverse military and academic training both inside and outside Rwanda.

He holds a bachelor's degree in military science from an undisclosed university. He holds two master's degrees. One is a Master's Degree in Governance and Leadership, awarded by the Ghana Institute of Management and Public Administration. The other is a Master's Degree in International Relations and Diplomacy obtained from Mount Kenya University. His postgraduate diploma in defence and conflict studies was also awarded by the Ghana Institute of Management and Public Administration. In addition, he is a graduate of the Senior Command and Staff College Course, administered at the Ghana Armed Forces Command and Staff College, in Accra, Ghana.

== Career ==
He joined the Rwandan military in 1986. Following basic military training, he was commissioned as Second Lieutenant in 1990. Over the years, he has been given increasing command and administrative responsibilities. "He once served as the Acting Head of the Department of Peace Support Operations at Rwanda Defence Forces Headquarters."

In 2014, at the rank of Lieutenant Colonel, he was transferred from the Rwandan Defence Forces (RDF) to the Rwanda National Police (RNP) and was appointed the Deputy Inspector General of Police responsible for Administration and Personnel. He was then appointed Commissioner-General of Rwanda Correction Service in April 2021, serving in that capacity until June 2023 when he was appointed Rwanda's Minister of Defence, replacing Major General Albert Murasira.

Two significant international assignments include as commander of an infantry company under the African Union Mission in Sudan, in Darfur, from July 2005 until February 2006. In addition, he was the Deputy Chief Military Personnel Officer at the headquarters of the United Nations Mission in Sudan (UNMIS), in Khartoum, between December 2009 and March 2011.

== Personal life ==
Juvenal Marizamunda is a married father of four children: two daughters and two sons.

== See also ==
- Rwandan Defence Forces
- Cabinet of Rwanda
- James Kabarebe

Political offices
Preceded by Albert Murasira	Minister of Defence (Rwanda); 6 June 2023 -	Succeeded by Incumbent
