= Lord's Resistance Army insurgency (2002–2005) =

The period from 2000 to 2006 of the Lord's Resistance Army insurgency in northern Uganda began with the assault of the Uganda People's Defence Force (UPDF) upon LRA strongholds in South Sudan. This in turn, led to a series of retaliatory attacks by the Lord's Resistance Army of an intensity not seen to since the mid-1990s. International awareness of the conflict gradually grew, and in September 2005, the International Criminal Court issued warrants for the arrest of senior LRA commanders, including Joseph Kony.

== Operation Iron Fist ==
Operation Iron Fist
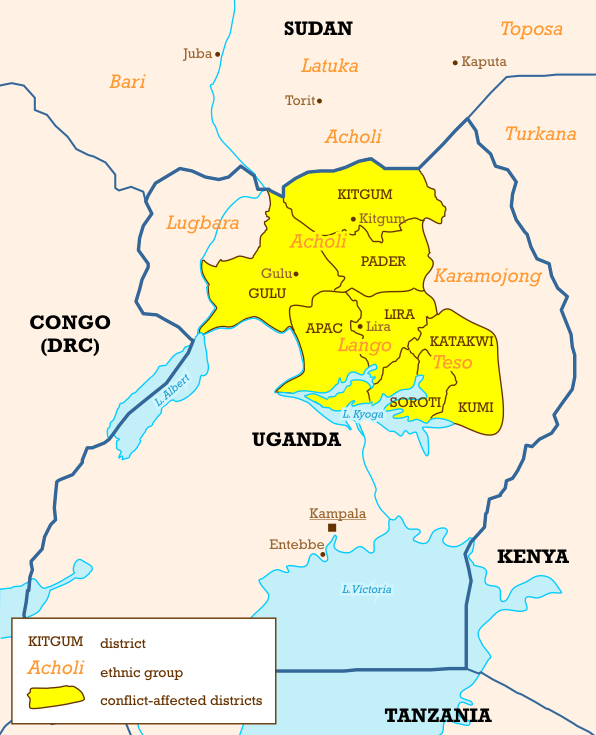
- Areas affected by the LRA insurgency after "Operation Iron Fist"
Date	March 2002-2003
Location	Acholiland
Result	LRA rear bases destroyed, increased LRA attacks in Uganda

Belligerents
Uganda People's Defence Force	Lord's Resistance Army

Commanders and leaders
Maj Gen. James Kazini	Joseph Kony

Strength
?	900–1500

Casualties and losses
?	?

In March 2002, the UPDF launched a massive military offensive, named "Operation Iron Fist", against the LRA bases in southern Sudan. The National Islamic Front government agreed to the entry of the Ugandan military into its borders, albeit below the so-called "red line" consisting of the Juba-Torit highway. This was part of its efforts to broadcast its new status as an engaged member of the international community. This agreement, coupled with the return of Ugandan forces that had been deployed in the Democratic Republic of Congo upon the official end of the Second Congo War, created what the Ugandan government felt was an ideal situation in which to end a conflict that had become both an embarrassment and political liability.

This attempt at a heroic finish to the conflict failed in a spectacular manner. After several months of uncertainty, LRA forces began crossing back into Uganda and carrying out attacks on a scale and of a brutality not seen since 1995 to 1996. The LRA then began to move into areas outside of Acholiland, apparently in search of support. However, when the local populace began to resist, the LRA extended its combat operations. This resulted in widespread displacement and suffering in regions that had never previously been touched by the insurgency.

One of the initial counterattacks was against Achol-pi Refugee Settlement on August 5, 2002. Twenty Sudanese refugees were killed in the second major attack on the Achol-pi Refugee Settlement in central Pader District. The 24,000 Sudanese refugees were transferred to safer locations and the settlement disbanded.

Part of the failure of Operation Iron Fist is due to the large stockpile of supplies that the LRA had accumulated during the period that it was supported by the Sudanese government. However, the government also failed to destroy all of the LRA positions in Sudan, resulting in a fluid low-intensity conflict affecting a significant area of both southern Sudan and northern Uganda. There have also been reports that at least some elements in the Sudanese government are continuing to provide supplies to the LRA. This would negate predictions of its imminent destruction which are predicated on its supposed isolation.

The former head of the UPDF, Maj. Gen. James Kazini, estimated LRA strength at 1,500 in May 2002. UPDF spokesman Maj. Shaban Bantariza put the figure at 900 fighters in mid-2003. These numbers are not necessarily contradictory if the first number includes noncombatants such as abducted "wives" and children too young to handle weapons. However, Human Rights Watch in a July 2003 report put the figure at 4,500. The International Institute of Strategic Studies (IISS) in its 2002 to 2003 report said LRA has 1,500 fighters. IISS added, however, that only 200 of the LRA troops are inside Uganda; the rest are in Sudan.

== Attempts at peace and militia creation (Early 2003) ==
In the spring of 2003, there were several unsuccessful diplomatic initiatives. Diplomatic efforts between the two sides historically failed because of an inability for the LRA to define an agenda and negotiate terms credibly. Meanwhile, the government has shown a predilection for abandoning diplomatic efforts in favor of military solutions. The government, remembering the simultaneous negotiations by the LRA with both Bigombe and Sudan in 1994, acted as if any LRA proposal was an attempt to achieve temporary military respite. Meanwhile, the LRA, on the basis of a number of occasions where units in a declared cease-fire zone were attacked, believed that the government was not credible. The UPDF declared that it had learned from past mistakes and was now certain to defeat the LRA. These proclamations had been made before, and many observers expressed scepticism.

The Ugandan army has struggled to defend many towns and villages from LRA attacks. The government fostered and armed militias against the LRA in the affected districts. Although these militias are variously called "Arrow Groups" and "Rhino Groups", the government apparently drew a lesson from the Arrow Group fiasco in the early 1990s and has armed these militias with assault rifles. Some observers fear that the introduction of more weapons in northern Uganda will create more problems in the longer term.

== Involvement of international organizations ==
During a November 2003 field visit to Uganda, United Nations Undersecretary-General for Humanitarian Affairs and Emergency Relief Coordinator Jan Egeland stated, "I cannot find any other part of the world that is having an emergency on the scale of Uganda, that is getting such little international attention." This was followed, on 14 April 2004, by UN Security Council condemnation of the atrocities committed by the LRA, and expressions of concern about the plight of the displaced children.

In December 2003, Ugandan President Museveni referred the LRA to the International Criminal Court (ICC) to determine if the LRA is guilty of international war crimes. ICC Prosecutor Luis Moreno-Ocampo formally opened an investigation in January 2004. Some local Ugandan groups have criticized this move, as an ICC conviction of Joseph Kony and his senior lieutenants is seen to make a negotiated end to the conflict nearly impossible. In November 2004, President Museveni was reported to be exploring ways to withdraw the referral made to the ICC, which was seen as a complication to what appeared to be a significant movement towards a negotiated peace. The human rights group Amnesty International protested the move.

== Late 2004 peace talks collapse (15 November to 31 December 2004) ==
On February 21, 2004, the LRA killed over 200 civilians in an IDP camp in Barlonyo, near Lira. This resulted in street protests and riots in Lira town on February 25, 2004 protesting the government's failure to adequately protect civilians. The riots caused at least nine deaths . The violence was partly motivated by animosity towards the Acholi, who many Langi collectively blame for the LRA insurgency.

From the middle of 2004 on, rebel activity dropped markedly under intense military pressure. There were reports of significant numbers of LRA rebels taking advantage of the government Amnesty Act. On 15 November 2004, the government declared a unilateral seven-day cease-fire subsequently extended. During the cease-fire substantial numbers of rebels gathered in government-designated zones to discuss a government proposal from August 2002.

In this proposal Museveni had offered to talk to the LRA, saying his government would under certain conditions halt operations against the LRA and open talks to end the conflict. These steps were taken after numerous LRA commanders contacted either the government or third parties and expressed a willingness to end the conflict. Senior LRA commander Brigadier Sam Kolo has stated that Joseph Kony has granted him the authority to negotiate on behalf of the rebels.

In mid-December 2004 a number of civilians were killed by bands of LRA operating near the Sudanese town of Juba. These rebels had purportedly lost contact with their chain of command under the ongoing government assault. Also, the Ugandan government reported that it had attacked a band led by Joseph Kony himself outside of the declared cease-fire zones. Sam Kolo stated that the continued government attacks make it difficult to establish a minimal basis of trust to progress with the peace talks. On 31 December 2004, the extended 47-day truce expired without an agreement.

== Negotiations amidst ongoing conflict (1 January 2005 to 3 February) ==
On 1 January 2005, rebels recommenced hostilities in Alero, Gulu. President Museveni declared that military "operations will not cease ever again until the Kony group irreversibly commit themselves to come out of the bush" and that "the combination of both the military option and dialogue will bring peace in northern Uganda." On 19 January, the humanitarian organization Médecins Sans Frontières listed the conflict in northern Uganda as one of the "Top Ten" most underreported humanitarian stories of 2004.

The signing of a peace deal ending the Second Sudanese Civil War between the government and the Sudan People's Liberation Army prompted speculation that a more stable Sudan would help end the LRA insurgency. In late January, SPLA leader John Garang pledged that he would not allow the LRA to operate in the south once he gained formal control of the region While Garang died in a helicopter crash several months later, this did not appear to shake the close cooperation between the SPLA and Uganda.

Throughout January 2005, talks mediated by Betty Bigombe continued in Gulu. LRA commanders Vincent Otti and Sam Kolo participated on behalf of Joseph Kony. However, the exact negotiating position of Kony remains uncertain. A senior analyst of the International Crisis Group stated, "He likens himself to Moses, and like Moses he doesn't believe he'll make it to the Promised Land, which provides a very dangerous ambiguity to whether he will ever let himself personally be part of the peace process."

A series of fires ravaged several congested IDP camps in January 2006. A fire in Agweng camp in northern Lira District, with 26,000 residents, killed six and left ten thousand homeless on 21 January. The next day 278 homes were burnt down in Apac District's Aboke camp. On Sunday, 23 January a fire at Acet camp in Gulu District affected six of seven zones, killing three and burning 4,000 huts, leaving 20,000 homeless.

== Another cease-fire and ICC announcement (February to September 2005) ==
On 3 February 2005, President Museveni announced an 18-day cease-fire, backing away from previous commitments to sustain military operations until the LRA committed to withdraw from the bush. Minister of Internal Affairs Ruhakana Rugunda commented that "the declaration of the 18-day cease-fire is a clear indication that the President or the government is committed to ending this 18-year-old war peacefully." Chief mediator Betty Bigombe stated on 7 February, "The cease-fire is absolutely holding and the peace process is now on course." However, the peace process was weakened after Sam Kolo, the LRA's chief negotiator, surrendered to the government in mid-February.

A U.S. State Department draft report released on 3 February stated that up to 12,000 people had been killed by rebel violence and 20,000 children had been abducted over the course of the war. This was the first attempt to quantify the casualties from the LRA conflict, but did not include deaths from conflict-related malnutrition and disease. The spokesperson for the Ugandan military expressed doubt about the accuracy of the estimate: "They are simply giving a probing figure. They do not have accurate information. They want to cause us to come out and dispute them which we may not do." The government also admitted for the first time that it was recruiting former abductees and returning them to the battlefield. The army stated that around 800 former abductees have been recruited, hundreds of whom are believed to be below 18 years of age.

In February 2005, the International Criminal Court announced that 12 arrest warrants were to be issued for LRA war crimes suspects, the first such warrants since the ICC was established in July 2002. The ICC chief prosecutor, Luis Moreno Ocampo, said the court intends to start its first war crimes trial in Uganda by July 2005. "During the coming year, there will be warrants," ICC spokesperson Christian Palme commented, "the prosecutor is looking at a very small group of LRA top leaders." Palme did not rule out possible prosecution of members of the Uganda People's Defence Forces in relation to their conflicts with the LRA, but stated, "LRA crimes are far more serious than the crimes of UPDF".

Following a visit to meet local leaders in northern Uganda, Ocampo stated that he might be able to delay issuing warrants in deference to the ongoing negotiations. Bigombe said that she would abandon mediation of the peace process if the ICC prosecution continued. During the first half of March, the LRA carried out six reported attacks in which 12 civilians were reported dead and about 50 were abducted, often in response to government proclamations that the rebels were nearly or completely defeated. The Ugandan government continued to maintain contact with the rebels, including Joseph Kony himself.

The government has been the target of increasingly pointed criticism from the international community for its failure to end the conflict. International aid agencies have questioned the Ugandan government's reliance on military force and its commitment to a peaceful resolution. "The military strategy employed by the Government of Uganda is not protecting its civilians," said Emma Naylor, Oxfam's Country Program Manager Officer in Uganda. "Instead we are seeing increased suffering and numbers of civilian casualties. We need a renewal of commitment from all sides to finding a peaceful solution to this conflict."

Some observers have accused the government of Yoweri Museveni of abandoning the north. Adams Aloo of the University of Nairobi has commented that "Since the north was proving to be quite difficult to control, [Museveni] did decide that he could lead the country without necessarily controlling the north ... To that extent, he has moved as if the north doesn't really matter, whether he brings it under control or not, that Uganda continues to move on, that the international community seems to be impressed with the pace of development."

In May 2005, the World Food Programme reported that 1.4 million people displaced by the conflict were facing severe food shortages. The ongoing insecurity prevented the IDPs from tilling and planting farm land, as well as making it difficult for relief organizations to reach persons in need. WFP warned that the predicted malnutrition would cause death rates to rise.

== LRA in the Democratic Republic of the Congo ==
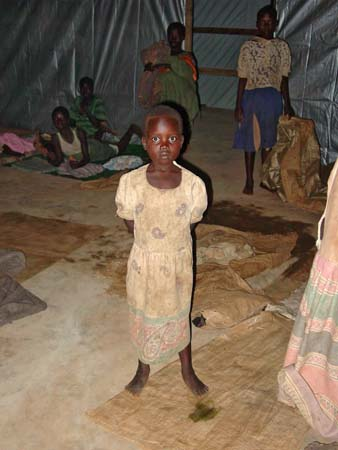
A "Night commuter"

Forty LRA rebels led by Vincent Otti crossed the White Nile on 14 September 2005 for the first time and burned houses near Juba, the capital of Southern Sudan, along the road to Yei. Since the rioting that followed the death of John Garang, Juba was almost entirely reliant on food shipped by road by Yei. The band continued travelling west and crossed into the Orientale Province of the Democratic Republic of the Congo (DRC) at Garamba National Park. At least two other bands, one of which was supposedly led by Kony, were reported to be moving westward from the historic stronghold of the LRA in northcentral Uganda and southeastern Sudan.

This was the first LRA movement into the DRC. The UPDF stated that they had achieved control of northern Uganda and that their military efforts were being frustrated by the refusal of the transitional Sudanese government to grant permission to cross the Juba-Torit "Red Line". Lieutenant General Aronda Nyakairima stated that "Kony's death was in sight had we got permission to follow him past the red line. He is now fleeing for his life just like Lakwena did." These claims came at the same time that Human Rights Watch called for the ICC to investigate the UPDF for war crimes in northern Uganda.

Representatives of the United Nations and the Congolese national army met with a band of LRA thought to be under the command of Vincent Otti in northeastern DRC on 25 September 2005. There was some surprise that this, the first meeting between the UN and LRA, was easy to arrange. General Paderi of the DRC army told the LRA that they needed to disarm as a prerequisite to future talks. Four days later, President Museveni declared that, if Congolese authorities did not disarm the LRA combatants, the UPDF would be sent across the border in pursuit. This sparked a diplomatic row between the governments of the DRC and Uganda, with both militaries making a show of force along their border, while the Congolese ambassador to the United Nations sent a letter to the UN Secretary-General demanding that an economic embargo be placed on Uganda in retaliation.

The Armed Forces of the Democratic Republic of the Congo (FARDC) planned to deploy 2800 troops to the area.
