= Aronda Nyakairima =

Ugandan politician and Military Officer

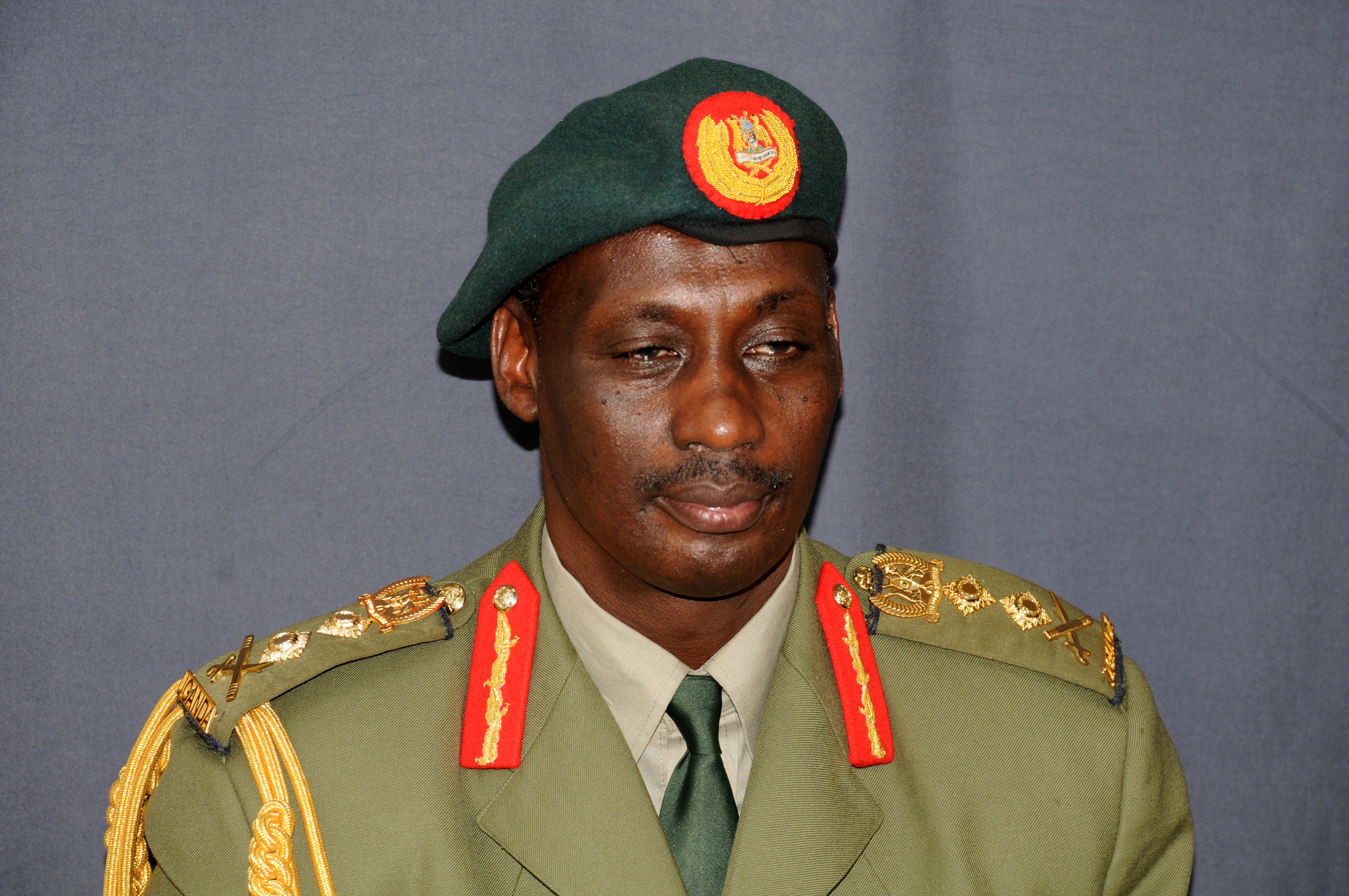
- Aronda Nyakairima in 2009
- Born: 7 July 1959; Rukungiri District, British Protectorate of Uganda
- Died: 12 September 2015 (aged 56); Dubai, United Arab Emirates
- Citizenship: Uganda
- Education: Makerere University (BA in Political Science); Uganda Military Academy (Basic Officers Course); US Army Command & General Staff College (Strategic Studies Course); Egyptian Military Academy (Senior Military Command Course)
- Occupation: Military Officer
- Years active: 1981 — 2015
- Known for: Military

Aronda Nyakairima (7 July 1959 – 12 September 2015) was a Ugandan military officer and politician who served in the Cabinet of Uganda as minister of internal affairs from 2013 until his death on 11 September 2015. Previously, he served as the Chief of Defence Forces in the Uganda People's Defence Force (UPDF) from 2003 to 2013.

== Early life and education ==
Nyakairima was born in Rukungiri District. He attended Lubiri Senior Secondary School for his O-Level studies from 1971 until 1974. Between 1975 and 1977, he studied at Kitgum High School in Kitgum District for his A-Level education. He joined Makerere University in 1978, graduating in 1981 with a Bachelor of Arts degree in political science. He attended the basic officers course in 1989, after the National Resistance Army (NRA) had captured power in Kampala, Uganda's capital city. He later attended a course in strategic studies at Fort Leavenworth in the United States. He also has further military qualifications from the Egyptian Military Academy in Cairo.

== Military career ==
He joined the NRA in 1982, soon after leaving Makerere University. After the NRA captured power, he worked as an intelligence officer in the Ugandan military. He later was appointed Assistant Director of the Directorate of Military Intelligence in the UPDF. He was then transferred to the Presidential Protection Unit as an intelligence officer. From there, he served as the commanding officer of the Armored Brigade before his appointment as commander of the UPDF in 2003. He has represented the UPDF in the Ugandan parliament since 1996.

== Induction into the Hall of Fame ==
In October 2010, Nyakairima was inducted into the International Hall of Fame at the Lewis and Clark Centre at Fort Leavenworth for attaining the highest position in the military of his country. Nyakairima was inducted together with General Eui Don Wang of South Korea, a 1986 graduate of the command college, and Major General Richard Rhys Jones of New Zealand, a 1992 graduate.

== Ministerial role ==
On 23rd May 2013, Nyakairima was appointed to the Cabinet of Uganda as the Minister of Internal Affairs. Katumba Wamala was appointed to replace him as Chief of Defense Forces, on the same day.

== Personal life ==
Nyakairima was married to Linda Kahooza, with whom he had two children. He was fluent in multiple languages, including Luganda, English, Luo, Runyakitara, and Swahili.

== Death ==
On 12 September 2015, he suddenly died on a flight en route South Korea to Dubai, while on official duty as the Minister of Internal Affairs. He was pronounced dead before the flight reached Dubai. Post-mortem examinations showed that he died of acute heart failure that was caused by severe and permanent blockage of the blood vessels supplying his heart. He died aged 56.

== See also ==
- Salim Saleh
- Elly Tumwine
- Mugisha Muntu
- Jeje Odongo
- James Kazini

Military offices
Preceded by James Kazini	Chief of Defence Forces of Uganda; 2003–2013	Succeeded by Katumba Wamala
