= Emmanuel Karenzi Karake =

Rwandan Lieutenant-General (born 1960)

- Born: December 23, 1960 (age 65); Ruanda-Urundi (present-day Rwanda)
- Military career
- Allegiance: Rwanda
- Branch: Rwandan Defence Forces (RDF)
- Service years: 1984 – Today
- Rank: Lieutenant General
- Commands: Chief of Military Intelligence (J2) Chief of Training, Plans and Operations, Republic of Rwanda; Commander of 408 Brigade (Rwanda Defence Forces); Commander, Third Division (Rwanda Defence Forces), Commander, Fourth Division (Rwanda Defence Forces), Deputy Force Commander, African Union Mission in Sudan, Joint Deputy Force Commander African Union – United Nations Hybrid Operation in Darfur, UNAMID Republic of Sudan
- Conflicts: Ugandan Bush War; Rwandan Civil War; First Congo War; Second Congo War: Six Day War (2000)
- Awards: National Liberation Medal; Foreign Campaign Medal; Presidential Inauguration Medal; Peace Support Operations Medal

Emmanuel Karenzi Karake (born December 23, 1960) is a Rwandan Lieutenant-General who is the former Secretary General of the National Intelligence and Security Services (NISS).

== Early years ==
Karake grew up in Uganda as a refugee from the former Rwandan government. He studied at Kira College Butiki for his Ordinary level education and Kings College Budo for his A levels. He attended Makerere University, and later joined the Rwandan Patriotic Front where he fought in the 1990-1994 Rwandan Civil War.

Karake attended the Senior Commander and Staff College at the South African Army College and the National Defence College in Kenya. The General holds a Bachelor of Commerce degree from Uganda's Makerere University, a Master of Arts in International Studies from the University of Nairobi in Kenya and a Master of Business Administration from the University of London.

== Senior command ==
Karake was appointed deputy commander of the African Union peacekeeping force in Darfur, Sudan in August 2007, and in January 2008 became deputy of the UN mission in Darfur. He left this command in April 2009. In February 2008 a Spanish judge indicted Karake, alleging that when he was Rwanda's intelligence chief between 1994 and 1997 he was responsible for a series of political assassinations and massacres. Human Rights Watch claimed that forces under his command had killed civilians in 2000 while fighting Ugandan troops in the Congolese town of Kisangani. The United Nations was embarrassed by the allegations of earlier human rights abuses, and agreed to extend Karake's tenure beyond its expiry in October 2008 only after pressure from the United States and the United Kingdom, and when Rwandan President Paul Kagame threatened to withdraw all Rwandan troops from Darfur if Karake was fired.

In April 2010 President Kagame announced a shake-up of the military command, and a few days later ordered the arrests of Karake, who was accused of immoral conduct, and of former air force chief Charles Muhire, accused of corruption. The men were said to be members of an exclusive circle of top officers in the former Rwandan Patriotic Front. The arrests followed newspaper reports that the two, reported to be popular and powerful figures in the military, had disagreements with Kagame.

== 2015 Arrest in London ==
Karake was arrested on 20 June 2015 in London, on an arrest warrant from Spain. Karake had been indicted in 2008 together with 39 other high-ranking Rwandan officials for grave crimes alleged to have been committed between 1990 and 2002, including the crime of genocide. As a result of Spanish legislation which weakened the doctrine of universal jurisdiction, the indictment was modified in 2014, and the charges were restricted to terrorism against nine Spanish nationals. Karake in particular was accused of numerous crimes, "including two massacres that claimed the lives of Spanish nationals in 1995 and 1997". The Rwandan government responded with Foreign Minister Louise Mushikiwabo calling the arrest an outrage. Karake had a court meeting the day of his arrest and was remanded in custody. On 10 August 2015, Karenzi has been freed by the UK justice, considering that "the relevant laws on the conduct alleged in this case do not cover the acts of non-UK nationals or residents abroad.".
