= Charles Muhire =

Rwandan air force officer (born 1958)

Charles Muhire is a Rwandan air force officer who was Chief of Staff of the Air Force before being arrested in April 2010.

Muhire was born in 1958 in Byumba, Rwanda. He studied at the Mulago Teaching Hospital in Uganda, graduating in 1979 with a higher diploma in Orthopedics and Traumatology. He joined the army and was commissioned in 1986. He attended the South African Air Force Command and Staff College, and subsequently took other air force training courses. Between 1990 and 1994 Muhire held various field commands. From 1995 to 1997 he was the Chief of Plans, Operations and Training at the Rwandan Patriotic Army Headquarters. He was later appointed Chief of Staff of the Rwandan Air Force. In July 2007 he was awarded an Order of Honour medal for his bravery and resilience in the 1990-1994 Rwandan Civil War.

In April 2010 President Paul Kagame announced a shake-up of the military command, and a few days later ordered the arrests of Muhire, accused of corruption, and of Major General Emmanuel Karenzi Karake who was accused of immoral conduct. The arrests followed newspaper reports that the two men, reported to be popular and influential figures in the military, had disagreements with Kagame. They occurred a few weeks after former Chief of Staff Lt-General Kayumba Nyamwasa had fled to South Africa, and were immediately followed by the arrest of Victoire Ingabire, who had announced that she planned to run for president in the August 2010 elections.

Muhire was released from prison in 2011 after issuing an apology to his military superiors.
