= Operation Kitona =

Offensive in the Second Congo War

- Part of Second Congo War
- Situation in Kinshasa, August 11-27, 1998
Date	4 – 30 August 1998
Location	Bas-Congo and Kinshasa Provinces in Western Congo 05°55′05″S 012°26′51″E
Result	Congolese victory

Belligerents
Rwanda; Uganda (Democratic Republic of the Congo) FAC Mutineers (unified into RDC on 16 August) (Democratic Republic of the Congo) RDC (From 16 August); Banyamulenge; UNITA (Limited to assisting the Rwandan retreat)	DR Congo; Zimbabwe (From 8 August); Angola (From 22 August)

Commanders and leaders
(Rwanda) James Kabarebe (Uganda) James Kazini (Democratic Republic of the Congo) Sylvain Mbuki (Democratic Republic of the Congo) Jean-Pierre Ondekane	(Democratic Republic of the Congo) Laurent-Désiré Kabila (Zimbabwe) Perrance Shiri (Zimbabwe) Mike Nyambuya (Angola) José Eduardo dos Santos

Units involved
Rwanda; High Command Unit Commandos; 3 RPA Battalions; Uganda; Nguruma Battalion; Various Light Artillery	Zimbabwe; No. 4 Squadron ZAF; No. 7 Squadron ZAF; No. 8 Squadron ZAF; SAS Commandos; Angola; Brigada de Commandos

Strength
3,000+ Rwandan and Ugandan Regulars 15,000+ Congolese Rebels	DR Congo Unknown; Zimbabwe 800+ Angola 2,500+

Casualties and losses
Unknown (Likely in the thousands)	Unknown
- Thousands of civilian casualties
- Location within Democratic Republic of the Congo

Operation Kitona was a Rwandan/Ugandan offensive that marked the beginning of the Second Congo War. Rwanda hoped to depose Laurent-Désiré Kabila and install a government more favorable to Rwanda's interests by quickly taking control of Kinshasa and the strategic western province of Bas-Congo (today Kongo Central). On August 4, 1998, joint Rwandan and Ugandan forces launched a surprise attack on Kitona airbase in Western Congo using hijacked civilian airliners. While initially successful in taking control of major ports and infrastructure, Zimbabwean and Angolan intervention prevented the Rwandans and Ugandans from taking control of Kinshasa. The invading forces were forced to withdraw to the jungles of Angola until they were evacuated by air to Rwanda in late 1998.

Today the operation is studied for its daring initial aerial assault, as well as the intelligence failures on the Rwandan side.

== Prelude ==
In the aftermath of the First Congo War, Rwanda, Uganda and Eastern Congolese allied groups had installed Laurent-Désiré Kabila in May 1997 as leader of the newly renamed Democratic Republic of the Congo. In turn, Kabila appointed many Rwandans as key officials in his new government and armed forces; including James Kabarebe who served as the Congolese army Chief of Staff. For over a year Rwandan soldiers and officials supported the Kabila Government, using the influence to export raw materials to Rwanda.

By late 1997 the Congolese population was growing weary of the Rwandan Patriotic Army (RPA), which fought anti-Rwandan insurgencies in the eastern Congo with considerable brutality, smuggled natural resources out of the country, confiscated land and dwellings, and disrespected civilians.

By mid-1998, internal ethnic tensions convinced Kabila that Rwandan influence was a threat to his power. On July 13, he removed all Rwandans from government positions and on July 27 ordered all remaining RPA and UPDF soldiers to leave the country. Kabila replaced these losses with friends, local militias, and surviving Hutu Génocidaires. Banyamulenge (Congolese Tutsis) were also removed from power as they were thought to be Rwandan sympathizers. These actions angered many in the Rwandan government, as it posed a threat to their influence in the Congo as well as the safety of Tutsis in both the DRC and Rwanda. Paul Kagame, Rwandan Minister of Defence, concerned of these outcomes for months, had begun drawing up plans for a second military intervention in the Congo in April 1998.

=== Rwandan plans ===
Kabarebe proposed flying Rwandan troops over 1,900 km (1,200 miles) to Kitona Air Base in western Congo, only 320 km (200 miles) from Kinshasa. Here they would be able to take control of the economically important Bas-Congo province, home to Congo's only seaports, as well as the Inga Dams, the main source of electricity for western Congo. In the ensuing chaos, they would then march to Kinshasa, depose Kabila, and install another pro-Rwandan regime. Kabarebe's experience in the Congo convinced him that various local dissidents, from interned Banyamulenge to ex-FAZ soldiers, would join the Rwandans and help swiftly depose the Kabila government.

=== Opening moves ===
On the evening of August 2 in Goma, FAC General Sylvain Mbuki and his deputy went to the local Rwandan-controlled Radio-Télévision Nationale Congolaise station. Once there, he announced a mutiny in the FAC and declared his intention to overthrow Kabila. While this message was broadcast, commandos from the Rwandan High Command Unit (HCU) moved into the city seized Goma International Airport as well as four civilian airliners and a number of lighter transports.

The following day, Rwandan HCU commandos took control of Goma International Airport, hijacking four civilian aircraft, 2 Boeing 727s and 2 Boeing 707s, sitting on the runway. On August 4, the commandos were joined by more Rwandan and Ugandan soldiers, including a Ugandan light artillery unit, numbering over 500 soldiers in total. The pilots were then ordered at gunpoint to fly west to Kitona Air Base.

On August 3, the Kabila government imposed a three-day curfew on Kinshasa, announced over the radio by Deputy Interior Minister Faustin Munene. The shooting heard in Kinshasa on the previous quieted down that morning. According to some reports, the fighting had been initiated by RPA soldiers who were being transferred back to Rwanda, and that there had been "heavy casualties" during the battle. The clashes involved fighting between Banyamulenge and other soldiers of the Congolese army at the Tshatshi and Kokolo military camps. Two Tutsi Alliance of Democratic Forces for the Liberation of Congo (AFDL) officials in Kabila's government, including Secretary-General Deogratias Bugera and Foreign Minister Bizima Karaha, fled the capital.

== Initial successes ==
=== Landing in Kitona ===
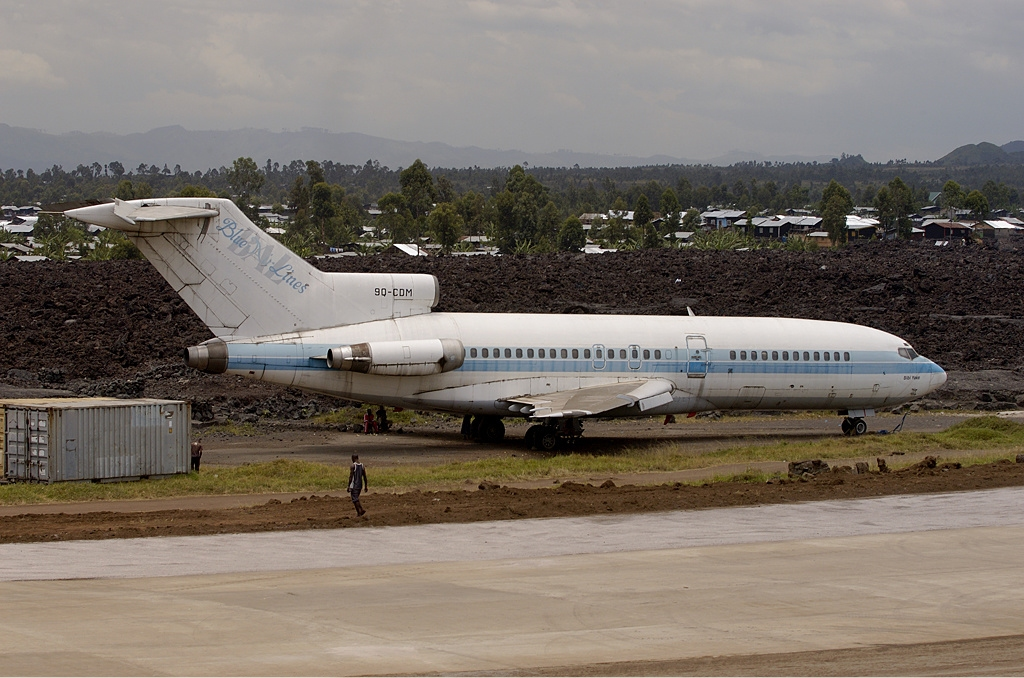
9Q-CDM, one of the 727s used in the initial attack on Kitona Air Base.

On the morning of August 4, the two 727s landed first, using their airstairs to discharge the HCU commandos as the aircraft were still taxiing. The Kitona Air Base's airfield and main facilities were captured within 30 minutes, and the remaining two 707s then landed and offloaded their troops and supplies. The four aircraft continued to fly between Kitona and Rwanda, and by August 5 over 3,000 Rwandan and Ugandan troops had been airlifted into Kitona. After the airfield was secured, Kabarebe convinced and bribed local Congolese army units to join his invasion force. These new recruits added over 2,000 Congolese Rebels, as well as Type 59 and Type 62 tanks and ZU-23 anti-aircraft cannons.

=== Actions on the coast ===
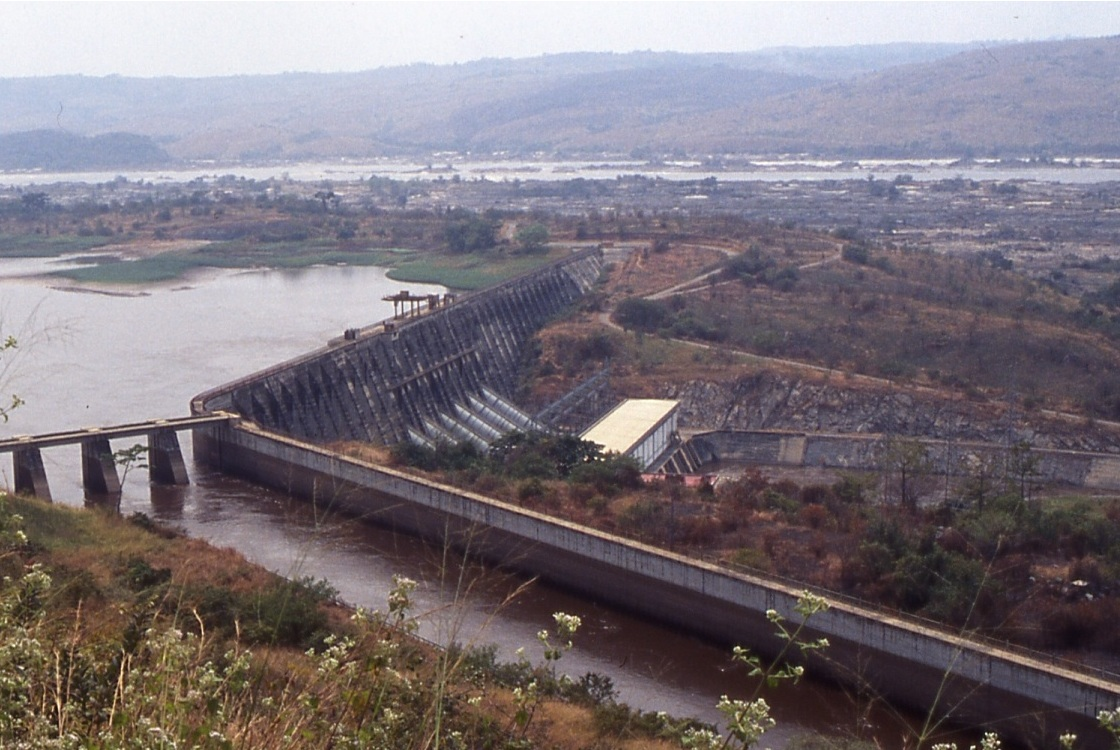
Inga I, one of the Inga Dams, a key early target of the operation.

This force quickly overwhelmed local Congolese forces loyal to Kabila. By August 5, the nearby oil infrastructure at Moanda and the port of Banana had been captured. Widespread rape and looting ensued in areas occupied by the Rwandans. August 7 saw the capture of Boma, 100 km (62 miles) inland of Kitona. On August 10, Matadi, Congo's most important seaport fell to the invaders. Three days later on August 13, the Inga Dams, a key early objective of the operation, were secured. Immediately upon arrival, Kabarebe ordered the turbines shut down, completely cutting off power to the city of Kinshasa.

=== Chaos in Kinshasa ===
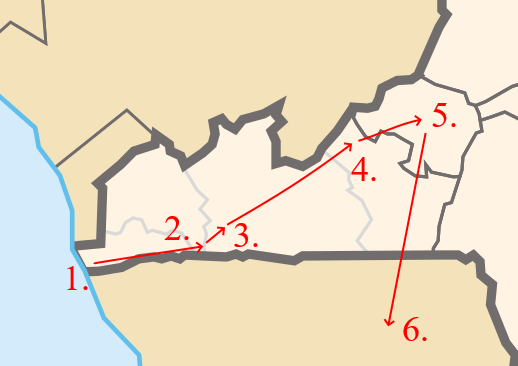
1. Initial Rwandan landing in Kitona 2. Capture of Matadi 3. Capture of the Inga Dams 4. Rwandan defeats at Kasangulu 5. Battle for N'Djili Airport 6. Rwandan retreat to Angola

By this point, Kabila's government was in chaos; Kinshasa was cut off from the outside world and without power, portions of eastern Congo were under Rebel control, and well armed Rwandan troops were only 230 km (145 miles) from Kinshasa. This caused panic among the government and general population throughout Kinshasa. Kabila's government and media outlets called upon the population to mobilize to protect the capital and root out those disloyal to the regime. Banyamulenge, Tutsis, political opponents, as well as ordinary citizens believed to be enemies were subject to property seizures, imprisonment, rape, torture, and summary execution.

== Foreign intervention ==
=== Zimbabwean intervention ===
Drawing of an Alouette III of the Air Force of Zimbabwe, as deployed in Congo in 1998. As a gunship helicopter, it is armed with two .30 machine guns.

Kabila had been in talks with Zimbabwe since before the outbreak of war, and on August 4 Robert Mugabe, the president of Zimbabwe, and Kabila signed a military cooperation treaty. On August 8 a contingent of Zimbabwean SAS led by Air Marshal Perrance Shiri arrived at N'Djili Airport outside of Kinshasa. This action, code-named Operation Sovereignty Legitimacy, marked the start of Zimbabwean involvement in the Second Congo War. By August 12, over 800 Zimbabwean Paratroopers and several Cascavel armored cars had been airlifted to Kinshasa. Kabila continued his pleas for aid from South African Development Community, and on August 17 Zimbabwe and Namibia agreed to support his efforts to combat the various threats to his regime. Angola remained supportive, but refrained from entering the war, while South Africa urged further talks. Zimbabwean reinforcement efforts intensified, and by August 22, Zimbabwean troops at N'Djili totaled over 800 ground troops, ground support, and pilots, 15 Cascavels, 8 Fighter and light attack aircraft, and over a dozen Alouette III and AB 412 helicopters configured for both gunship and transport use.

=== Rwandan setbacks ===
While Kabila was searching for allies, Kabarebe continued his advance towards Kinshasa. On August 11, Rwandan forces were ambushed before they could begin an attack on Kasangulu, 45 km (28 miles) south of Kinshasa. By August 17 the main Rwandan force had advanced as far as Kinsielele, 30 km (18 miles) south of Kinshasa, using country roads before running out of fuel. From this point onward, the Zimbabwean air support proved invaluable, as the Rwandans were relatively ill-equipped to defend themselves from aerial attacks. In this regard they depended entirely upon the FAC mutineer's ZU-23 guns, which they lacked experience in operating. This proved particularly devastating on August 24, when the Rwandan Tanks were spotted by a ZAF helicopter outside of Kasangulu. The lead tank was disabled, giving Zimbabwean paratroopers time to set up an ambush further along the road. In the ensuing skirmish, several of the captured tanks were destroyed, and most of the rest captured. The Rwandans were now delayed several kilometres outside Kinshasa, with little remaining armor and under constant threat of Zimbabwean air attack.

=== Angolan intervention ===
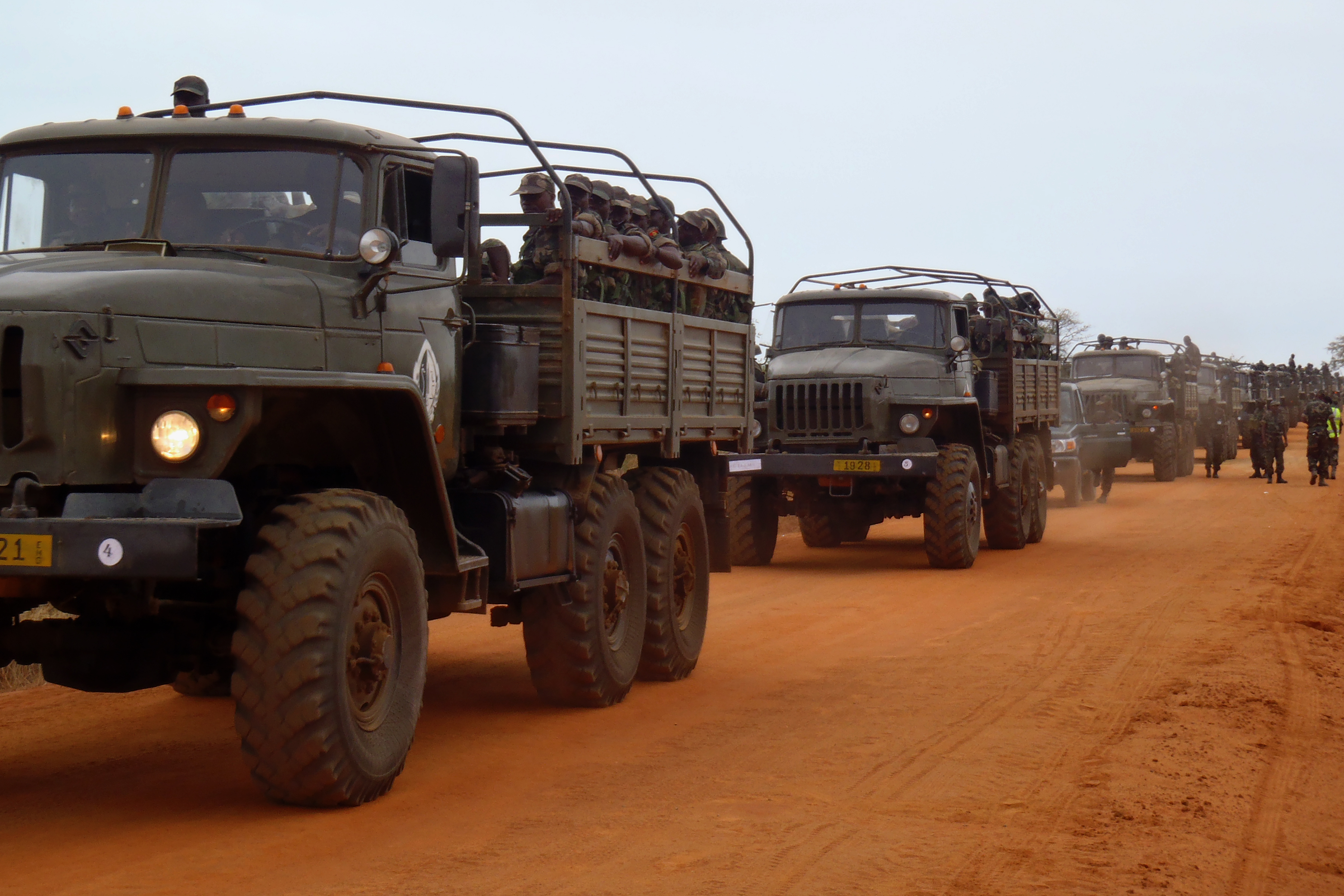
Angolan Army Personnel, with equipment similar to that in use in 1998.

Before beginning the operation, Rwandan intelligence had indicated Angola had no intention of assisting Kabila's regime. Under Kabila, the Congo had sheltered members of UNITA, an insurgent group in conflict with the MPLA since Angola's independence from Portugal. While this information was accurate with respect to many in the Angolan Army, José Eduardo dos Santos, the President of Angola, remained a friend of Kabila. On August 22, a force of 2,500 Angolans entered the Congo, retaking Kitona the following morning. The Rwandan rear guard continued to fight however, with Banana and Moanda holding out until the 28th. Once recaptured, these cities were once again subject to rape and looting by the victorious Angolan troops. It is widely believed that Kabila's regime would not have survived the operation without Angolan Intervention.

== The battle for Kinshasa ==
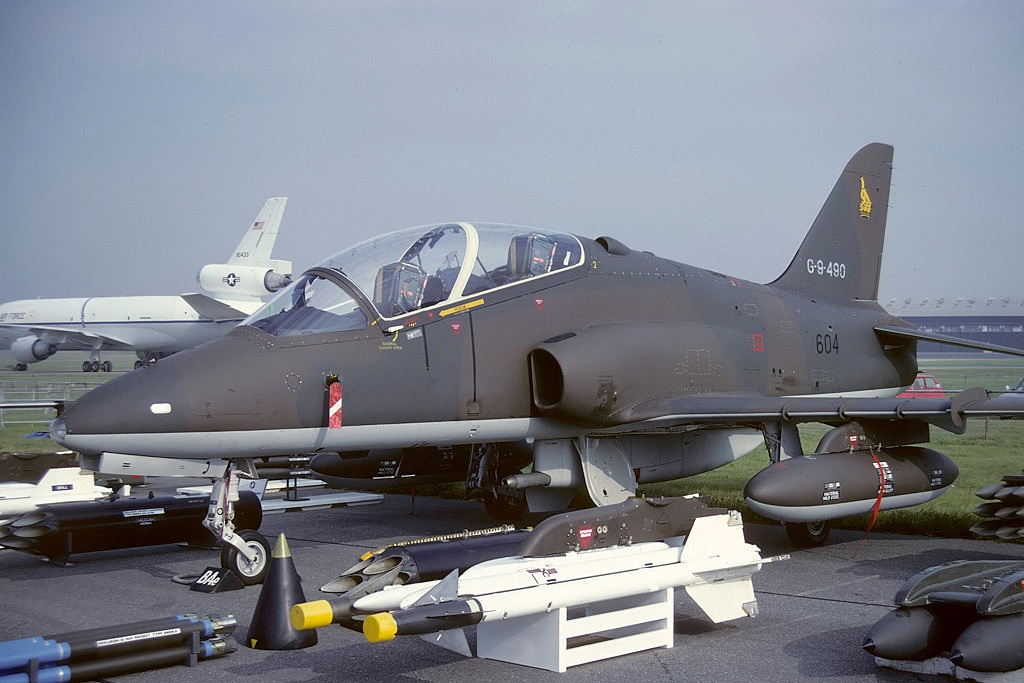
A ZAF Hawk similar to those used in the defense of N'Djili Airport

While cut off from the coast and reinforcements, Kabarebe was still in command of nearly 15,000 troops in high spirits on the outskirts of Kinshasa. Instead of attacking along the Kasangulu road a third time, Kabarebe realized the Zimbabweans at N'Djili were both outnumbered and the only real support for the Kabila government, given the unreliable performance of the remaining FAC troops. Zimbabwean Major-General Mike Nyambuya realized this and on August 25 deployed numerous SAS teams across the outskirts of Kinshasa with the aim of delaying the Rwandan advance. While these were initially effective, on August 26 FAC mutineers disguised as retreating FAC soldiers still loyal to Kabila managed to slip into the city. One of these groups headed for N'Djili Airfield, where they managed to get within 100m of the airport before being found out and gunned down by the Zimbabwean troops guarding it.

The second wave of Rwandans and FAC mutineers managed to overwhelm the defenders, and the Rwandans captured the western end of the runway as well as the main terminal and hangars. The control tower and eastern end of the runway remained in Zimbabwean hands. From here all remaining ZAF helicopters and jets were made airborne. They continuously pounded the Rwandan positions throughout the city for the remainder of the day. That afternoon two ZAF helicopters extracted Kabila from the presidential palace who was then flown to safety in Lubumbashi. Sporadic fighting continued throughout Kinshasa for the remainder of the 26th.

On the morning of August 27 Kabarebe deployed his remaining tanks and anti-aircraft guns in a final attempt to capture the rest of the airfield. Throughout the day ZAF aircraft flew continuous sorties, taking off from the north side of the runway under Zimbabwean control, bombing the Rwandan positions on the south side, then returning to be refueled and rearmed. At the peak of the fighting, average turnaround for the aircraft was reduced to less than five minutes. Due to the constant attack from the air and determined defense of the remainder of the airfield, the first Rwandan assault was unable to take any ground. A second attack later in the afternoon also failed and resulted in the loss of all remaining tanks and anti-aircraft guns.

Nyambuya ordered a counterattack to retake the airfield early on the 28th which encountered heavy resistance. Eventually the Rwandans were dislodged and forced to retreat to the Kimbanseke and Masina neighborhoods where they had prepared trenches and other defensive works throughout the previous few days. Two days of trench warfare ensued until August 30, when Kabarebe and the remaining Rwandan and Ugandan troops abandoned the FAC mutineers, and fled south into the Jungle. This marked the end of organized fighting for Kinshasa and Operation Kitona.

== Kabarebe's retreat ==
Kabarebe's forces were now in a difficult position; they were nearly 1,500 km (930 miles) from the nearest allied forces in Kivu and surrounded on three sides. To the west lay Kitona, which was now under the control of the Angolans who were now headed towards Kinshasa, north was the Congo River which Kabarebe was unable to cross due to a lack of boats, and east lay 1,500 km of jungle and the Congolese Army. As a result, they headed south towards Angola and friendly UNITA forces. September 1, Angolan troops with support from Zimbabwean SAS commandos finally recaptured the Inga Dams, whose Ugandan defenders slipped away to rendezvous with the remaining Rwandan attack force. By this point Kabarebe had identified an airfield outside the Angolan town Maquela do Zombo which was defended by over 400 Angolans. The Rwandan troops took time to regain strength and in mid-September launched an attack on the airfield with the assistance of local UNITA insurgents, quickly taking control of it.

The runway however was too short, and needed to be lengthened in order to allow large cargo planes to land to complete the evacuation. For the next two months, Kabarebe's men worked on lengthening the runway from 1,400m to 1,800m. During this period they also fended off numerous Angolan attacks, including one consisting of over 26 armored vehicles. Once the runway was lengthened transports undertook over 30 flights to evacuate the remaining Rwandans and Ugandans by cover of darkness. By December 24, all remaining Rwandans and Ugandans, numbering around 3,000, had returned to Rwanda.

== Aftermath ==
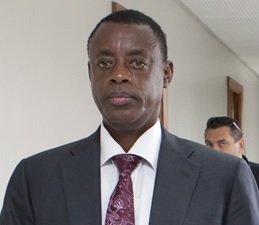
James Kabarebe in 2012.

Following Kabarebe's retreat, Congolese, Zimbabwean, and Angolan troops spent much of the next few months re-establishing order throughout western Congo. In the ensuing violence thousands of suspected rebels were raped, tortured, and killed. The remaining ~12,000 FAC mutineers either fled into the Jungle, switched sides again, or were killed outright.

Three years after the Rwandan failure to depose Laurent-Désiré Kabila, he was assassinated by his own bodyguards on 16 January 2001. He was succeeded by his son, Joseph.

Although powers on both sides expected the conflict to end shortly after the operation failed, Operation Kitona served as the opening act to the Second Congo War, which would continue for another 5 years and claim more than 5 million lives.

Although a defeat for the Rwandans, James Kabarebe would become a national hero in Rwanda for his leadership during the offensive.

The operation is also studied at military colleges throughout the world for its innovative use of airborne infantry, and for its intelligence failures; chiefly the Rwandans' mistaken belief that Angola would not support Kabila's government.

== Works cited ==
- Cooper, Tom (2013). Great Lakes Conflagration: Second Congo War, 1998–2003. Solihull: Helion & Company Limited. ISBN 978-1-920143-84-8.
- Stejskal, James (2013). "The Kitona Operation: Rwanda's Gamble to Capture Kinshasa and the Misreading of an "Ally"". Joint Force Quarterly (68): 99–104. ISSN 1070-0692.
