= James Kazini =

Ugandan general

Major General James Kazini
- Born: c. 1957; Kasese District, British Uganda
- Died: 10 November 2009 (aged 52); Namuwongo, Makindye Division, Kampala, Uganda
- Occupation: Military officer

Major General James Kazini (1957–2009) was a Ugandan military officer who served as Chief of Staff of the Uganda People's Defence Force (UPDF) from 2001 to 2003.

== Early life and career ==
He was born in 1957 in the Basongora ethnic group, in Kasese District, in Western Region of Uganda. He attended Ntare School in western Uganda where he was a year ahead of Paul Kagame who later became president of Rwanda but left before completion of his O level studies. Prior to 1984, Kazini was a member of the Uganda National Rescue Front, a rebel group then headed by General Moses Ali, which was based in West Nile, in northwestern Uganda. Around 1984 he left that group and joined the National Resistance Army, headed by Yoweri Museveni, as an enlisted soldier.

He went on to become one of Salim Saleh's body guards. He became a commissioned officer at the rank of Captain in 1987, Major in 1989 and Lieutenant Colonel in 1991.

He was the nephew of Ugandan President Yoweri Museveni.

== Ghost Soldiers Scandal ==
In December 2003, President Yoweri Museveni, the Commander in Chief of the UPDF, committed Kazini and a dozen senior officers to the General Court Martial on various charges, especially creation and maintenance of "ghost" soldiers on the army payroll after Museveni created a committee to investigate the 'ghost soldier' phenomenon within the Ugandan Army. Others included Brigadier Nakibus Lakara (former chief of staff), Brigadier Henry Tumukunde (former director general of the Internal Security Organization) and Brigadier Andrew Gutti, who was later pardoned and promoted. Of those charged, only Kazini was found guilty. Kazini had led Operation Iron Fist (2002), an attempt to wipe out the remaining Lord's Resistance Army forces, where the entire 4th Division was found to be made up of ghost soldiers, costing the army $37.4 million for 24,000 ghost soldiers and requiring an extra 4,000 soldiers to be drafted in to provide additional support.

On 27 March 2008, when the General Court Martial under Lieutenant General Ivan Koreta sentenced him to three years in jail for causing financial loss of Shs60 million (approximately US$30,000), Kazini wept. Kazini and others, still on trial, allegedly maintained 24,000 fictitious names on the army payroll which resulted in loss of Shs600 billion (approximately US$300 million) over 13 years. He was released on bail after the conviction.

Journalist Andrew Mwenda claimed that Kazini was singled out for conviction because he had claimed that the money from the ghost soldiers was being used to pay off Ugandan-backed rebels in the Democratic Republic of the Congo.

He later challenged the sentence in the Constitutional Court, arguing that the Court Martial had no jurisdiction to hear the case, but he lost the appeal. He lodged an appeal in the Supreme Court and the case was due for hearing.

== Military leadership and Career ==
One of the attributes that served him well on his rise to the top in the UPDF was his reputation as a fearless soldier, often personally leading his soldiers into battle on the front-lines, as he did during Operation Kitona in the Second Congo War. The other attribute was his total commitment to the commander in chief and the UPDF. Museveni is reported to have repeatedly ignored complaints about Kazini's limited formal education. Over the years, he repeatedly promoted him and gave him increasing security and defence responsibilities.

Kazini's rise through the ranks of the UPDF has also been credited to his close relationship with Salim Saleh, the brother of President Museveni, for he was otherwise never popular among the top echelons of the National Resistance Army. Independent journalist Obed Katureebe claimed that Kazini had "stepped on many colleagues' toes" in his rise to power. For instance, it is alleged that, while posted as commander of the Mechanised Brigade in the 1990s, Kazini wrote a secret intelligence report accusing General David Tinyefuza and Colonel Kizza Besigye of plotting to overthrow Museveni's government. Tinyefuza would be on the very committee that investigated Kazini for creating ghost soldiers.

Katureebe also reported that Kazini, at this point still a favourite of Museveni, had orchestrated the sacking of General Jeje Odongo by accusing him of leaking sensitive information to the Rwandan Government. The discord between the two men had reached a peak in the late 1990s when Odongo had written a report blaming Kazini for the outbreak of hostilities between Rwanda and Uganda in Kisangani that led to the UPDF's expulsion from the city.

Furthermore, he had disagreed with the then Director of Records Major Mutengesa, who fled the country after trading accusations with kazini about the use of ghost soldiers. A commission of inquiry would later exonerate Mutengesa and implicate Kazini. In 2003, he similarly forced Colonel Edison Muzoora into exile, where he later joined the People's Redemption Army rebel group. Katureebe accordingly refers to Kazini's leadership style as 'factional' and 'abrasive'.

From March 2002, James Kazini had been charged with leading Operation Iron Fist, an attempted final blow to the Lord's Resistance Army insurgency in Northern Uganda and Sudan. The unit he commanded, the 4th Division of the Ugandan Armed Forces, was found to be composed entirely of ghost soldiers, following which an additional 4,000 troops were deployed to support the operation. Following donor pressure, Kazini was suspended as army commander in 2003 and sent to Nigeria for training at a war college. He was replaced by the more inexperienced Aronda Nyakairima.

In 2003, the Porter Commission named James Kazini as one of the senior military officials to have taken part in the 'plunder' of eastern Congo.

In April 2009, facing court-martial for his role in the ghost soldiers scandal, Kazini was also accused of conducting unilateral military deployments and of plotting to overthrow President Museveni in a military coup. Kazini was alleged to have privately recruited and trained 7,000 men at Bihanga Training School in Mbarara for the purpose of creating a semi-autonomous military unit, the 409 Brigade, in the West Nile region towards that end. The committee investigating Kazini's use of ghost soldiers claimed that he had re-routed the funding through units under his control to better manage the recruits without the knowledge of the Ugandan Army leadership.

== Death ==
On the morning of 10 November 2009, sometime around 6AM local time, Major General James Kazini died at the home of his girlfriend, in the Kampala suburb of Namuwongo, after being struck on the head with a metal bar during a domestic brawl. At the time of his death James Kazini was 52 years old.

His alleged killer, 28-year-old Lydia Draru, who also goes by several different aliases, was arrested, presented before a magistrate and remanded to jail, pending trial for capital murder. Kazini left behind five children, four daughters and one son, with two different women. His alleged killer did not have a child with him.

Lydia Draru was tried and convicted of murder. In 2011, she was sentenced to fourteen years in prison. She served her sentence at Luzira Maximum Security Prison. She was released from prison on 12 January 2021. Two years were subtracted from her sentence on account of her good conduct while in prison. The two years she spent in jail, while on trial was counted as part of her sentence.

== See also ==
- Salim Saleh
- Elly Tumwine
- Mugisha Muntu
- Jeje Odongo

Military offices
Preceded by Jeje Odongo	Commander of Uganda People's Defence Force; 2001–2003	Succeeded by Aronda Nyakairima; As Chief of Defense Forces of Uganda
