= Ecole des Sciences Byimana =

Coordinates: 2.1460°S 29.7436°E

- Ruhango District; Southern Province; Rwanda

Information
- Religious affiliation: Christian
- Denomination: Roman Catholic
- Founded: 1952
- Enrollment: c900

Byimana School of Sciences is a Catholic boarding high school in Rwanda. It counts over 700 students in six grades. The school's motto is "Science, Conscience, and Excellence". It encourages its students to have spiritual, intellectual and physical growth by giving them opportunities for praying, playing sports and interacting among themselves through clubs.

== Geography ==
Ecole des Sciences Byimana is located in Ruhango District, Southern Province, Rwanda. Byimana sector, precisely at Bukomero hill, is where resides the boarding school and one of the Marist Brothers Congregations in Rwanda. The school is a 800 meters away from the main Muhanga-Butare road.

== History ==
Ecole des Sciences Byimana was established in 1952 by the Marist Brothers. It opened its gates as Bukomero Primary School with boys only, then became Ecole des Moniteurs. Since its foundation, Brother Alvarus, Leon Jozef Backx was the principal of the school for almost five decades. In 1978, Ngombwa Stanislas, next headmaster of the school, was in the sixth scientific class. In 1987, the school started admitting girls. In the 1994 Rwanda genocide, the school lost many of its staff members as well as students. The school has had many names but the best known is Ecole des Sciences Byimana. In 2002, the school celebrated its 50th anniversary with 800 students, boys, and girls.

In 2008, apart from Tronc Commun (ordinary level/middle school), the school had two options: Bio-Chimie (Biology-Chemistry) and Math-Physique(Maths-Physics), whence it gets its name Byimana school of Sciences. The academic language for the school has been French, but from early 2009 the Rwandan government has switched its education system to English as Rwanda entered the East African Community(2007) and the Commonwealth(2009). From the same year (2009) the name "options" changed into 'combinations' in the Rwandan academic system and the school stayed with three combinations: PCM (Physics, Chemistry, and Mathematics), PCB (Physics, Chemistry, and Biology), and MCB (Maths, Chemistry, and Biology), along with its ordinary level. In 2014 there was the introduction of MPC (Maths, Physics, and Computer) of which the first students graduated in 2016.

== Headmasters ==
Frère Rugereka 'irihimbano) niwe wabanjirije Kigori

- Brother Alvarus (1952–1995)
- Brother Ngombwa Stanislas(1996–2002)
- Straton, Brother Malisaba (19 October 2006). "Rwandan headmaster gets wacky welcome The science teacher shows some school spirit of his own when he stops in Bellbrook on a fundraising trip". Dayton Daily News. Dayton, OH. Archived from the original on 2 November 2012 – via HighBeam Research.
- Brother Ngombwa Stanislas (2009–2013)
- Brother Alphonse Gahima (2013–2015)
- Brother Malisaba Straton (2015–2017)
- Brother Crescent Karerangabo (2018–2022)
- Brother Ingabire Jean-Marie-Vianney(JMV)(2022–present)

== Values and Mission ==
Marcellin Champagnat, the founder of the Marist Brothers quoted "to raise children we must love them and love them equally" The school provides knowledge as well as discipline following in Champagnat footsteps that are love and caring. The school's main courses are in the sciences: math, physics, biology and chemistry. Other than science, students are assisted spiritually: the students get together every day for prayer and worship. Although the school is Catholic, everyone has the right to participate in whatever religion they want. The school receives everybody regardless of their religion, origin, etc. Yet, some students don't get the opportunity to study there because the school has tough admission conditions based on the Ordinary Level National Exam. The school is able to achieve its goals due to the collaboration and good understating of its students and staff. The school space is also helpful: it has enough buildings (dorms, dining halls, classrooms and laboratories). However, some of the buildings are quite old. Yet the school continues to enlarge to fit the standards and provide the best education possible. Byimana alumni expects skilled people that are intended to contribute to Rwanda's reconstruction.
