= Patrick Nyamvumba =

Rwandan general

General Patrick Nyamvumba

Chief of Defence Staff of the Rwanda Defence Force
- In office 22 June 2013 – November 2019
- Preceded by: Lt Gen Charles Kayonga
- Succeeded by: Gen Jean Bosco Kazura

Personal details
- Born: 11 June 1967 (age 58) Rwanda

Military service
- Rank: General

Gen. Patrick Nyamvumba (born 11 June 1967) is the immediate past Chief of Defence Staff of the Rwanda Defence Force (RDF) and the Minister of Internal Security of the Republic of Rwanda.

From 2013 to 2019, he served as the Chief of the Rwandan Defence Force. Prior to that, from 2009 to 2013, he served in Sudan as Force Commander of the AU-UN Hybrid Operation in Darfur (UNAMID). A graduate of the Nigerian Defence Academy, Nyamvumba previously served the RDF as a commander of infantry forces, Commandant of the Rwanda Military Academy in Nyakinama, Musanze District, President of the Military High Court (2007-2009), Chief of logistics, and Chief of Operations, Plans, and Training (1998-1999).

== War crimes allegations ==
As the head of the Training Wing of the Rwandan Patriotic Front (RPF) during the Rwandan Civil War, Nyamvumba allegedly commanded death squad operations in which Hutu civilians in RPF-controlled areas were butchered. Nyamvumba's troops lured and killed Hutus at meetings. Some were hunted down and killed with guns or hoes and dumped in the Akagera River. Victims were also loaded onto trucks, taken to Akagera National Park and killed there, before being burned and incinerated.
