= Marcel Gatsinzi =

Rwandan soldier and politician (1948–2023)

Minister of Defence (Rwanda)
- In office 15 November 2002 – 10 April 2010
- Preceded by: Emmanuel Habyarimana
- Succeeded by: James Kabarebe

Personal details
- Born: 9 January 1948 Kigali, Ruanda-Urundi
- Died: 7 March 2023 (aged 75) Brussels, Belgium

Marcel Gatsinzi (/mɑːrˈsɛl ɡɑːtˈsɪnzi/ mar-SEL gaht-SIN-zee; 9 January 1948 – 7 March 2023) was a Rwandan soldier and politician, who was Minister of Disaster Management and Refugee Affairs from 2010 to 2013. Gatsinzi also served as Rwanda's Minister of Defence from 2002 to 2010. An ethnic Hutu from Butare, Gatsinzi was a member of the Rwandan Armed Forces (FAR), which was the national army prior to the takeover of Rwanda by the Rwandan Patriotic Front (RPF) during the 1994 Rwandan genocide.

== Biography ==
Gatsinzi was born in Kigali on 9 January 1948. He started his formal education at Collège Saint-André in Nyamirambo, Kigali, where he graduated with a diploma in 1968. His military career began at the Kigali Military Academy in the same year, and he was commissioned as a second lieutenant on 31 March 1970.

Gatsinzi pursued his military career courses in Belgium at Heverlee (Louvain) in the School of Logistics in 1971 and in Brussels at the Royal High Institute of Defence from 1974 to 1976.

Beside the military assignments in the Rwandan Army, Colonel Gatsinzi served in the OAU Neutral Military Observer Group set by the Organization of African Unity. That OAU NMOG was meant to monitor the cease fire during the period of the negotiations between the Government and the RPF during the Rwandan Civil War (1990–1994). He also participated in the negotiations process.

During the genocide, from 6 to 17 April 1994 he served as Army Chief of Staff of the FAR. Because he advocated a more moderate approach and opposed expansion of the genocide, Gatsinzi was removed from the post and was replaced by Augustin Bizimungu. Afterwards he was promoted to brigadier general and assigned to negotiate with the RPF and "other duties that did not involve direct command of troops".

=== After the genocide ===
Because of his resistance to the genocide and willingness to negotiate with the RPF, he was integrated into the Rwandan Patriotic Army shortly after their taking power. He was appointed chief of staff of the gendarmerie in 1997.

Gatsinzi held various political and military appointments with the following as his main career highlights:

- Deputy Chief of Staff of Rwanda Patriotic Army from 1995–1997
- Chief of Staff of the National Gendarmerie from 1997–2000
- Secretary General of the National Security Service from 2000 to 2002
- Minister of Defence on 15 November 2002
- Re-appointed Minister of Defence on 19 October 2003 till 10 April 2010
- Minister of Disaster Management and Refugee Affairs from 2010 to 2013

Gatsinzi held a series of honorific military medal awards.

Gatsinzi was appointed Minister of Defence on 15 November 2002, succeeding Brig.-Gen. Emmanuel Habyarimana.

Gatsinzi died on 7 March 2023, at the age of 75.

Preceded by Emmanuel Habyarimana	Minister of Defence (Rwanda); 15 November 2002 – 10 April 2010	Succeeded by James Kabarebe
