= List of ambassadors of Rwanda to China =

Coordinates: 39.912116°N 116.439952°E

Ambassador of Rwanda to China
- Incumbent; Charles Kayonga since February 25, 2014
- Inaugural holder: Kabanza Innocent
- Formation: 1972

The Rwandan Ambassador in Beijing is the official representative of the Government of in Kigali to the Government of the People's Republic of China.

== List of representatives ==
| Diplomatic agreement/designated/Diplomatic accreditation | Ambassador | Observations | List of presidents of Rwanda | Premier of the People's Republic of China | Term end |
|---|---|---|---|---|---|
| November 12, 1971 | | The governments in Kigali and Beijing established diplomatic relations | Grégoire Kayibanda | Zhou Enlai | |
| 1972 | Kabanza Innocent | | Grégoire Kayibanda | Zhou Enlai | 1973 |
| 1973 | Justin Temahagali | *In the 1960s he was préfet de Gikongoro. | Grégoire Kayibanda | Zhou Enlai | 1975 |
| 1975 | Nyandwi Tharcisse | | Juvénal Habyarimana | Zhou Enlai | 1979 |
| 1980 | Sylvestre Kamali | | Juvénal Habyarimana | Zhao Ziyang | 1983 |
| July 11, 1984 | Magira Bigirimana Denis | *In 1989 he was ambassador in Paris. | Juvénal Habyarimana | Zhao Ziyang | 1987 |
| February 26, 1992 | Isidore Jean Baptiste Rukira | | Juvénal Habyarimana | Li Peng | |
| July 12, 1999 | Valens Munyabagisha | | Pasteur Bizimungu | Zhu Rongji | |
| August 22, 2002 | Joseph Bonesha | | Paul Kagame | Zhu Rongji | |
| March 25, 2005 | Benjamin Rugangazi | Ben Mathias Rugangazi 05. 3.25 | Paul Kagame | Wen Jiabao | |
| September 3, 2010 | Xavier Francois Ngarambe | *On February 25, 2014he became ambassador in Bern. | Paul Kagame | Wen Jiabao | |
| February 25, 2014 | Charles Kayonga | Lt.Gen. | Paul Kagame | Li Keqiang | |
