= Ministry of Defence (Rwanda) =

Government ministry of Rwanda

- Minisiteri y'Ingabo; Ministère de la Défense
- Emblem of Rwanda

Agency overview
- Jurisdiction: Government of Rwanda
- Headquarters: Kigali, Rwanda
- Minister responsible: Juvenal Marizamunda, Minister of Defence
- Child agency: Rwanda Defence Force
- Website: www.mod.gov.rw

The Ministry of Defence (Kinyarwanda: Minisiteri y'Ingabo; French: Ministère de la Défense), abbreviated MOD, is the ministry of the Government of Rwanda in charge of defence. It oversees the Rwanda Defence Force (RDF).

The Minister of Defence is responsible for the conduct and implementation of defence programmes. Since June 2023, the minister has been Juvenal Marizamunda.

== Role ==
The ministry is in charge of the Rwanda Defence Force. The minister leads and carries out the country's defence programmes. The ministry's Kinyarwanda name, Minisiteri y'Ingabo, appears in its official documents.

== Affiliated agencies ==
Several organs and agencies are placed under the direct authority of the minister:

- Military courts
- Military Prosecution Department
- National Defence University (NDU)
- Rwanda Peace Academy (RPA)
- Defence Research and Development (DRD)
- Military Medical Insurance (MMI)
- Rwanda National Defence and Security Organs Shop (AFOS)

== Ministers ==
The following people have served as Minister of Defence.

- Calliope Mulindahabi (1962–1965)
- Juvénal Habyarimana (1965–1991)
- Maj.-Gen. Augustin Ndindiliyimana (1991–1992)
- James Gasana (April 1992 – July 1993)
- Augustin Bizimana (July 1993 – July 1994)
- Maj.-Gen. Paul Kagame (1994–2000)
- Brig.-Gen. Emmanuel Habyarimana (2000 – November 2002)
- Gen. Marcel Gatsinzi (November 2002 – April 2010)
- Gen. James Kabarebe (April 2010 – October 2018)
- Maj. Gen. Albert Murasira (October 2018 – June 2023)
- Brig.-Gen. Juvenal Marizamunda (since June 2023)
