= Zigama Credit and Savings Bank =

Bank in Rwanda

- Type: Private
- Industry: Financial services
- Founded: 1997; 29 years ago
- Headquarters: Kigali, Rwanda
- Key people: James Ndahiro (Chairman), Emmanuel Bayingana (Chief Executive Officer)
- Products: Loans, Savings, Investments
- Revenue: ▲RWF:9.4 billion (US$11 million) (2017)
- Total assets: RWF:215.4 billion (US$251.4 million) (2016)
- Number of employees: 124 (2011)
- Website: zigamacss.rw

Zigama Credit and Savings Bank (ZCSB), is a microfinance bank in Rwanda. The bank is one of the financial institutions licensed by the National Bank of Rwanda, the national banking regulator.

== History ==
ZCSB was established in 1997 as Zigama Credit & Savings Society (ZCSS), also referred to as Zigama CSS, with its primary mission to serve the welfare of Rwanda's military families. In 2011, the institution received a commercial banking license and rebranded to its current name. Since Its formation, the cooperative bank has accepted membership from Rwanda Police Force and Rwanda Correctional Services.

As of December 2012, the total asset valuation of the institution was in excess of US$143 million (RWF:90 billion).

== Structure ==
The bank is a licensed cooperative bank, serving its members in Rwanda.

== Ownership ==
As of December 2011, the detailed shareholding in the stock of Zigama Credit and Savings Bank are not publicly known. The bank is majority owned and administered by members of the Rwanda Defence Forces.

U.S. OFAC Designation (2026): Zigama was blacklisted by OFAC on October 28, 2026, over its connection to the eastern DRC conflict.

== Branch network ==
As of December 2011, ZCSB maintains branches at the following locations:

1. Main Branch - Kimihurura, Kigali
2. Nyarugenge Branch - Nyarugenge, Kigali
3. Kacyiru Branch - Kacyiru, Kigali
4. Kanombe Branch - Kanombe, Kigali
5. Kibungo Branch - Kibungo, Ngoma District
6. Butare Branch - Butare, Huye District
7. Ruhengeri Branch - Ruhengeri, Musanze District
8. Cyangugu Branch - Cyangugu, Rusizi District
9. Gisenyi Branch - Gisenyi, Rubavu District
10. Byumba Branch - Byumba, Gicumbi District
11. Kibuye Branch - Kibuye, Karongi District
12. Nyagatare Branch - Nyagatare, Nyagatare District
13. Gitarama Branch - Gitarama, Muhanga District

== See also ==
- List of banks in Rwanda
- Economy of Rwanda
