= Emmanuel Habyarimana =

Rwandan politician and former military officer

- Born: 20th century Katanga, Congo
- Allegiance: Rwanda
- Branch: Rwandan Armed Forces (FAR)
- Spouse: Aline Umutesi
- Other work: Politician

Emmanuel Habyarimana (born Katanga Plateau) is a Rwandan politician and former military officer.

Habyarimana, an ethnic Hutu, was a former member of the Rwandan Armed Force in the Hutu-dominated state of Juvénal Habyarimana. Following the successful conquest of Rwanda by the RPF, he joined the newly constituted Rwanda Defence Force and held the rank of colonel.

In 1997, he was made Minister of State for Defence in the Rwandan government. In 2000, he became Rwanda's Minister of Defence, and was later sometime afterwards promoted to Brigadier-General. While serving in this position he played a significant part in Rwanda's actions in the Second Congo War.

In November 2002, he was removed from his post as Minister of Defence, which government spokesperson Joseph Bideri attributed to his "extreme pro-Hutu" views. He was replaced by Marcel Gatsinzi.

On 30 March 2003 he defected to Uganda along with several other Rwandan army officers, including Lieutenant Ndayambaje and Lieutenant Colonel Balthazar Ndengeyinka.

Preceded by Paul Kagame	Minister of Defence (Rwanda); 2000 – 15 November 2002	Succeeded by Marcel Gatsinzi
