= James Kabarebe =

Rwandan military officer (born 1959)

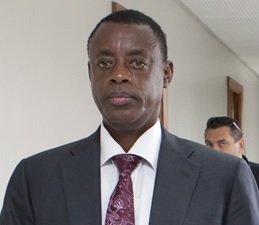
- Kabarebe in 2012

Minister of State for Regional Integration
- In office September 2023 – December 2025
- President: Paul Kagame
- Succeeded by: Office disestablished

Minister of Defence
- In office 10 April 2010 – 18 October 2018
- President: Paul Kagame
- Preceded by: Marcel Gatsinzi
- Succeeded by: Albert Murasira

Personal details
- Born: 1959 (age 66–67) Ibanda, Uganda
- Party: Rwandan Patriotic Front
- Education: Makerere University

Military service
- Allegiance: Uganda; Rwanda
- Branch/service: Rwandan Patriotic Army/Defence Force; Congolese Armed Forces (1997–1998)
- Years of service: 1980s–2010
- Rank: General
- Commands: Chief of the Rwandan Defence Staff; Chief of Staff of the Congolese Armed Forces
- Battles/wars: Rwandan Civil War; First Congo War; Second Congo War; Operation Kitona; Battle of Kisangani; Kivu conflict; Eastern Congo offensives

James Kabarebe (born 1959) is a Rwandan politician and retired military officer who serves a senior military advisor to President Paul Kagame of Rwanda since 2025. He previously served as Minister of State for Regional Integration from 2023 to 2025, Minister of Defense from 2010 to 2018, and Chief of Staff of the Rwandan Patriotic Army from 2001 (Rwandan Defence Force from 2002) to 2010.

Kabarebe commanded the Rwandan Patriotic Army's Republican Guard from 1990 to 1994, in which role he was responsible for providing close protection for army commander Paul Kagame. Kabarebe became a key figure in both the First Congo War and the Second Congo War. He was one of the main commanders of the Banyamulenge rebellion that began the first war in 1996, and the Alliance of Democratic Forces for the Liberation of the Congo (AFDL) was founded in his office. He orchestrated the AFDL's operations, and after its victory, he was the chief of staff of the new Congolese Armed Forces from 1997 to 1998, until the outbreak of the second war. He was the Rwandan commander in the DRC from 1998 to 1999, before being appointed as RPA deputy chief of staff in 2000.

Kabarebe was appointed as acting chief of staff of the RPA in 2001, before it was renamed as the Rwandan Defense Force (RDF) in 2002. In his role of Minister of Defence he was accused of being the de facto leader of the March 23 Movement, a militia in the eastern Democratic Republic of the Congo.

== Early life and education ==
James Kabarabe was born in 1959. Raised in Ibanda western Uganda, he had his early primary education at Kyamate Primary School in western Uganda and attended O-level secondary education at Kabalega Secondary School in Masindi, Bunyoro Western Uganda.

He proceeded for A level education at St. Henry's College Kitovu in 1979. He later attended Makerere University, where he received a Bachelor of Arts degree in economics and political science. He was commissioned in 1989.

== Education ==
James Kabarebe received his primary education at Kyamate Primary School in western Uganda. He attended Kabalega Secondary school in Masindi for his O-level studies before enrolling at St. Henry's College Kitovu' where he completed his a-level education in 1979. He later studied at Makerere University graduating with a Bachelor of Arts in Economics and Political Science.

== Rwandan Patriotic Army ==
James Kabarebe was the private secretary and aide-de-camp (ADC) of Paul Kagame. During the Rwandan Civil War, he became Commander of the High Command Unit at Mulindi. Later, this unit became the Republican Guard under Kagame's leadership.

== First Congo War ==
During the First Congo War, Kabarebe was the commanding officer of a Rwandan-led army that crossed into Zaire (now the Democratic Republic of the Congo). The aim of the army was to defeat the ex-FAR and Interahamwe, Hutu militia groups that had committed the genocide against the Tutsi and were engaged in cross-border attacks on Rwanda, destroy the refugee camps that the militia groups and Hutu civilians were living in, and overthrow Zairian President Mobutu Sese Seko.

As chief military strategist in Laurent-Désiré Kabila's rebel Alliance of Democratic Forces for the Liberation of Congo (ADFL), Kabarebe helped engineer the capture of Kinshasa, the capital of the Democratic Republic of the Congo, on 17 May 1997, and the defeat of Mobutu Sese Seko.

At the end of this mission, he was appointed Chief of Staff of the Congolese Army by Kabila. However, relations between Rwanda and Kabila soon deteriorated in circumstances that would eventually lead to the Second Congo War. Fearing a coup d'état, around 27 July 1998, Kabila dismissed Kabarebe from his post. Kabila then appointed General Célestin Kifwa, a Congolese who had previously served in Angola.

== Second Congo War ==
In his time as chief of staff, the 10th division, stationed in eastern Congo, began adding more Banyamulenge, Banyarwanda and ex-Rwandan Defence Forces troops who tended to oppose Kabila. Following his dismissal as Chief of Staff in July 1998, Kabarebe and Ugandan and Congolese allies began planning an attack on western Congo, intended to quickly topple the Kabila regime. On 4 August, he led an airborne assault on Kitona Air Field airlifting with him around 3,000 RPA and UPDF soldiers.

His troops advanced quickly, taking major ports and infrastructure in eastern Congo in a matter of days. In their march the coalition is alleged to have raped and murdered civilians and pillaged banks. In an effort to take Kinshasa the coalition cutoff the power to the city causing according to the UN "the death of an unknown number of civilians, particularly children and hospital patients."

By 22 August he had reached Kinshasa, but Zimbabwean, Namibian, and Angolan intervention prevented his troops from taking and deposing Kabila. He was forced to withdraw to Angola until final evacuation in December 1998. During the retreat of the coalition forces, the Angolan Armed Forces are alleged to have carried out similar atrocities as the coalition did on its march towards Kinshasa.

Kabarebe served as the commander of Rwandan operations in the DRC until late 1999, after the Battle of Kisangani. He was later appointed as the RPA deputy chief of staff in February 2000, and he became the acting chief of staff in November 2001.

== Rwandan Defence Forces ==
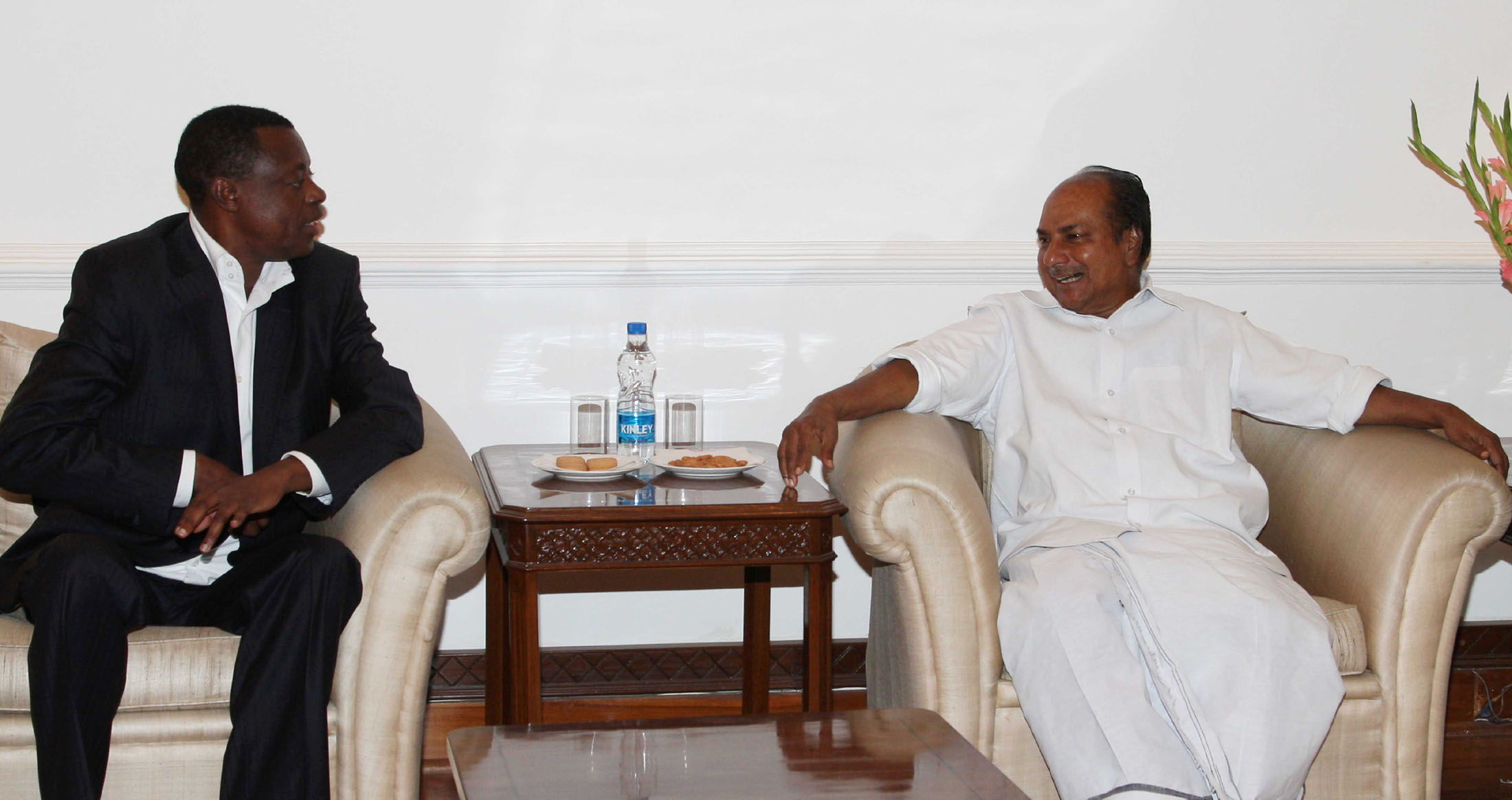
General James Kabarebe calling on the Defence Minister, Shri A. K. Antony, in New Delhi on 30 March 2012

In October 2002, President Paul Kagame appointed Kabarebe to the position of Chief of Defence Staff of the Rwandan Defence Forces.

On 30 August 2023, the Rwandan Ministry of Defence issued a press release that saw Kabarebe and the former Rwanda Reserve Force chief, General Fred Ibingira retired. Also on the list was the former Minister of Defence Major General Albert Murasira.

== Accusations ==
Kabarebe was one of ten Rwandan officials accused in 2006 by Jean-Louis Bruguière, a French judge, of having taken part in the shooting down of the plane of then-president Juvenal Habyarimana. Kabarebe and other senior official have denied these claims. In February, 2008, a Spanish judge, Fernando Andreu, issued arrest warrants against 40 Rwandan officers including Kabarebe. The charges in both cases were later dropped.

In 2012, a report from a United Nations Security Council group of experts accused Kabarebe and other Rwandan officials of being the de facto leaders of the M23 militia. M23 is accused of carrying out killings, rapes and other atrocities in the eastern Democratic Republic of Congo. Kabarebe and Rwanda deny the charges.

In 2025, the United States imposed sanctions on Kabarebe for liaising with M23 in its offensive and facilitating the export of minerals seized by the rebels in the DRC.

== See also ==
- Rwandan Defence Forces
- Rwandan Patriotic Army
- First Congo War
- Second Congo War
- Cabinet of Rwanda
- Kinsangani battle (1997)

Political offices
Preceded by Marcel Gatsinzi	Minister of Defense; 2010–2018	Succeeded by Albert Murasira
