= Six-Day War (2000) =

Subconflict of the Second Congo War

- Part of the Second Congo War
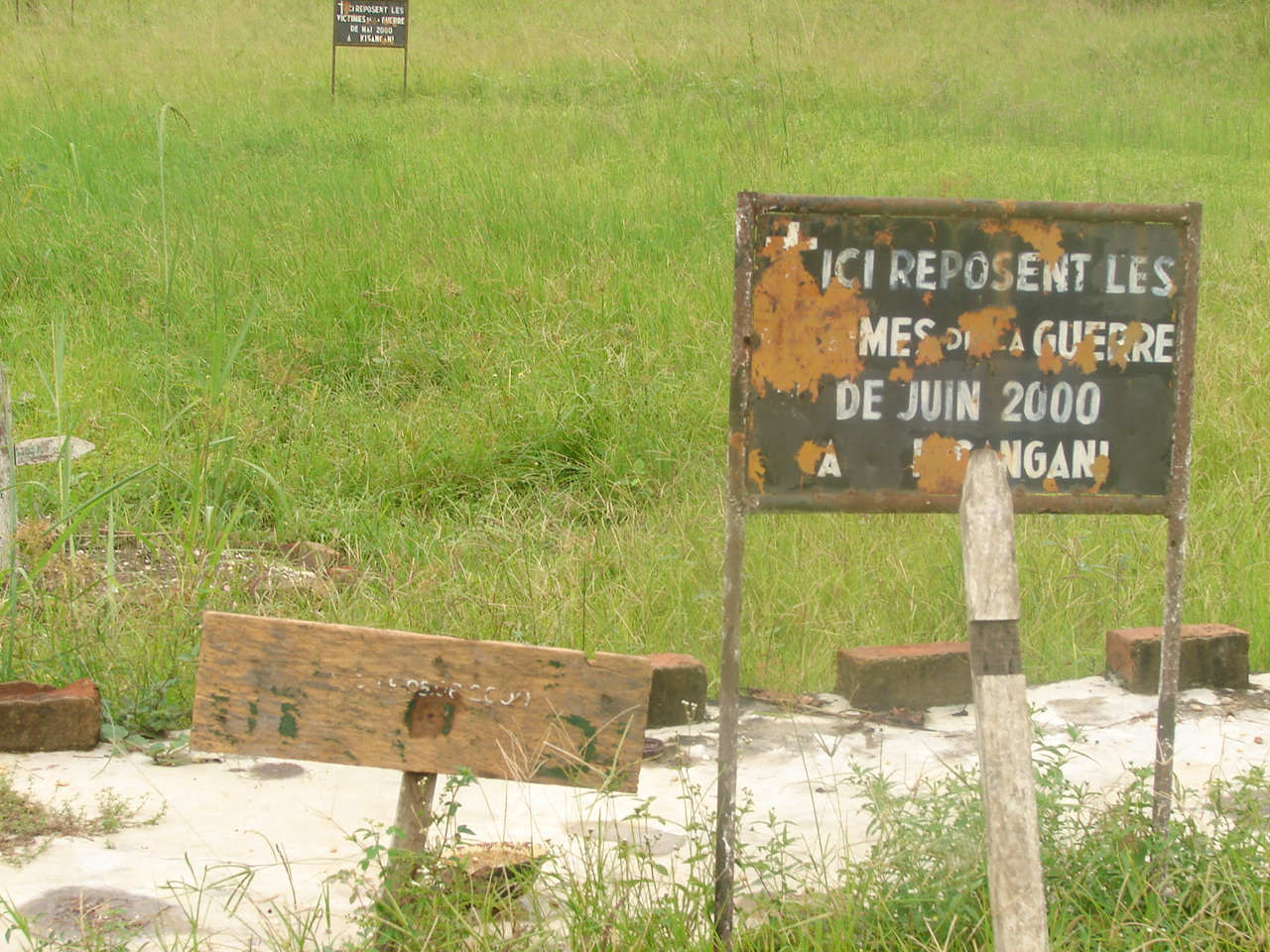
- Memorial cemetery of the Guerre des Six Jours of 2000
Date	5–10 June 2000
Location	Kisangani, Democratic Republic of the Congo
Result	UN-brokered ceasefire: Rwandan and Ugandan troops withdraw from Kisangani; Kisangani controlled by Rwanda-aligned RCD–Goma

Belligerents
Rwanda	Uganda

Commanders and leaders
(Rwanda) Emmanuel Karenzi Karake	(Uganda) James Kazini

Units involved
Rwandan Patriotic Army; 75th Battalion	Uganda People's Defence Force; 9th Battalion

Strength
1,000+ troops	3,000 troops

Casualties and losses
	~600–700 killed
- At least 1,000 killed, 3,000 wounded, and 75,000 displaced

The Six-Day War (French: Guerre des Six Jours) was a series of armed confrontations between Ugandan and Rwandan forces around the city of Kisangani in the Democratic Republic of the Congo (DRC) from 5 to 10 June 2000, during the larger Second Congo War. While being allies, Uganda and Rwanda backed different rebel groups fighting against the government of the DRC. Kisangani was captured early on in the war and became a logistics base for both armies. However, tensions between rival rebel groups led to fighting in August 1999 and in May 2000.

After the fighting in May 2000, Uganda and Rwanda agreed to demilitarize the city, following talks brokered by the UN Secretary-General Kofi Annan. However, on 5 June a Uganda People's Defence Force (UPDF) vehicle was attacked, and Uganda blamed it on the Rwandan Patriotic Army (RPA). The UPDF then began shelling the city using artillery, before sending in troops with armored vehicles and tanks. Every every district of Kisangani was damaged by small arms and artillery fire during the fighting, which lasted for six days. The UN brokered nine separate ceasefires. The RPA managed to maintain control of the city center and both of its airports by the end of the conflict. The UPDF withdrew its troops to north of the city on 10 June, at which point United Nations Organization Mission in the Democratic Republic of the Congo (MONUC) observers deployed in between the two armies.

Uganda and Rwanda both withdrew their troops from the city in the weeks after the war. Kisangani remained under the control of the Rwandan-backed Rally for Congolese Democracy–Goma (RCD–Goma). At least 1,000 people were killed, 3,000 were injured, and 75,000 were displaced, including over 60,000 into the jungles near the city.

== Background ==
Kisangani, located in the Orientale Province of the northeastern Democratic Republic of the Congo (DRC), was the third largest city in the country, with a population of 500,000. It was captured by Rwanda- and Uganda-backed rebel forces on 23 August 1998, shortly after the outbreak of the Second Congo War. Kisangani became a logistics base for the armies of both invading countries, having two airports and being located at the junction of three large rivers. By August 1999, disagreements among the rebels caused the region to be divided among three rebel groups and two national armies: the Rwandan Patriotic Army (RPA), supporting the Rally for Congolese Democracy–Goma (RCD–Goma); and the Uganda People's Defence Force (UPDF), supporting the Kisangani faction of the RCD (RCD–Kisangani) and the Movement for the Liberation of the Congo (MLC).

The dispute between the RCD factions escalated, and a battle broke out that lasted from 7 to 17 August 1999, before a ceasefire was negotiated by Ugandan President Yoweri Museveni and Rwandan Vice President Paul Kagame. Though the agreement called for Kisangani to have an elected government instead of one nominated by the RCD, the change was not implemented. The Kisangani faction of the RCD had leave the city and move to Bunia, where it was renamed as the Movement for Liberation (RCD–ML). Kagame became the acting president of Rwanda in early 2000. After that, in April, both national armies began moving additional forces into Kisangani as tensions increased again.

Another battle between the UPDF and the RPA broke out in Kisangani on 5 May 2000. Museveni and Kagame ordered their armies to cease fire on 7 May, and US Ambassador Richard Holbrooke brokered talks between the two leaders on 8 May that led to an agreement for both sides to demilitarize the city. More fighting occurred on 9 May. Kisangani's population was deprived of supplies, but despite that and the fighting, state exams went ahead in most of the city. Observers from the United Nations Organization Mission in the Democratic Republic of the Congo (MONUC) arrived on 12 May. A demilitarization agreement was reached by Rwandan and Ugandan commanders on 21 May, after the battle killed at least 27 Congolese civilians and injured 150. The terms called for a withdrawal from Kisangani to begin on 25 May, under which almost all troops would move 100 km away from the city by 16 June. Tensions remained high during the withdrawal, however. On 2 June, flights resumed between Entebbe International Airport in Uganda and Kisangani, allowing supplies to reach the city via chartered flights by Congolese and Ugandan traders. By 4 June, the UPDF had moved all of their forces to Camp Kapalata north of the city, with the exception of a single company at Kisangani Bangoka International Airport.

== Course of the war ==
On the morning of 5 June, a UPDF Toyota Land Cruiser with Ugandan liaison officers and MONUC personnel was attacked by a rocket-propelled grenade and gunfire near the Tshopo bridge, in northern Kisangani. The UPDF blamed the attack on the RPA. About one hour later, fighting broke out all over Kisangani as the UPDF began shelling targets in the city. The only working turbine of the Société Nationale d'Électricité (SNEL), the DRC's national electric company, was knocked out when the artillery attack started, leaving Kisangani without power or water. The UPDF began sending armored vehicles and tanks into the city center. By the end of the first day, a number of Ugandan officers and Rwandan troops were taken prisoner. MONUC negotiated a ceasefire with the UPDF and RPA commanders on the evening of 5 June, but it was ignored by both sides and fighting continued. As of 6 June, the two armies were exchanging artillery fire in northern Kisangani, which was mostly held by the UPDF, while the city center was held by the RPA and combat with light weapons was reported there. Food supplies were running out, and the city's two airports were closed. At least 60 people were admitted to Kisangani's general hospital after being wounded by the fighting.

As of 8 June, artillery fire continued between the two sides, and both the Bangoka Airport and the smaller Simi Simi Airport were controlled by the RPA. An estimated 80 Congolese civilians had been killed in the fighting, and the local hospital could not work because of the power cut. That day, UN Secretary-General Kofi Annan and Holbrooke brokered another ceasefire agreement between presidents Museveni and Kagame, but the battle continued all throughout the city on the following day. Both sides blamed each other for violating the ceasefire. A MONUC officer accused Rwandan and Ugandan commanders in Kisangani of blocking attempts to reach a ceasefire. On 9 June, Doctors Without Borders reported that an estimated 2,000 shells had been fired on the city. The fighting affected all parts of Kisangani and made it difficult for citizens to find food and water. In the last several days of fighting, 19 children were killed in school, and the UNICEF compound and the hospital were hit by shelling. On 10 June, the UPDF withdrew to the Camp Kapalata area, leaving the RPA in control of the city center and both of the airports, Bangboka and Simi-Simi. MONUC observers were put in place between the two armies on the Tshopo bridge, following the UPDF withdrawal, and hostilities ceased on that day. The RPA opened the Bangboka Airport to international humanitarian flights, and promised to hand over its positions to UN observers. At least 6,000 shells were fired into the city, according to the UN.

== Aftermath ==
=== Casualties and impact ===
Small arms fire and artillery fire from north of the Tshopo and south of the Congo River hit all residential and commercial districts, and many homes were destroyed, particularly in the Tshopo commune. The neighborhood had been the site of the most combat between Rwandan and Ugandan troops, and many bodies were left lying in the streets. When the ceasefire went into effect, Doctors Without Borders and the International Committee of the Red Cross carried out an assessment of the city's healthcare facilities, reporting at least 45 dead and 1,100 injured. The ICRC collected the bodies of 140 soldiers and 630 civilians. Ultimately it was determined that over 1,000 people were killed, and at least 3,000 were wounded. About 75,000 people were displaced, and at least 60,000 fled into the jungles around Kisangani. Of the displaced population, 12,500 were reported to be in the city itself. The Six-Day War was the most damaging outbreak of fighting between Uganda and Rwanda in the city, compared to the previous two.

Humanitarian agencies, including Doctors Without Borders, the ICRC, Oxfam, Airserv, MONUC, and the United Nations Office for the Coordination of Humanitarian Affairs (OCHA) set up a task force in the city in the days after the ceasefire. As of 15 June, markets in the city slowly began reopening. Food prices were very high, and although water was restored in the city, it was of poor quality. The Tshopo bridge was reopened to civilian traffic on 22 June, after a successful de-mining operation by the RCD police force. As of August 2000, unemployment was increased after the fighting, because many firms had to close down or reduce their activity. The purchasing power of the population was also reduced. The fighting damaged the railway from Kisangani south in the direction of Kindu, while the southern highway and the rivers were impassable due to insecurity. There was also a major food crisis. The schools in the city were closed due to the war, and were reopened in August to complete the academic year that month, instead of in early July as normally scheduled.

=== Reactions ===
On 7 June 2000, Uganda's president Museveni blamed Rwanda for the fighting in Kisangani in a speech to the parliament of Uganda, saying "the RPA's provocation forced the UPDF to move and put a front at Tshopo bridge following which the RPA launched 12 attacks on the UPDF which were all repulsed". Kagame accused Museveni of "bad faith" and "telling lies" about the war, also saying that Uganda was "training Hutus" to overthrow him and "destabilize Rwanda". Rwanda denied media reports on 7 June that the Rwandan army spokesman, Lt. Col. Wilson Rutayisire, had been killed in Kisangani, stating that he killed himself in Goma. Brig. Gen. Kayumba Nyamwasa, the RPA chief of staff, blamed Uganda for the breakdown of the ceasefire on 9 June, stating "violated the ceasefire a few hours after they asked for it". In total, MONUC negotiated nine separate ceasefires over the course of the war.

On 12 June, DRC President Laurent-Désiré Kabila appealed to the Congolese people to form militias even with spears and darts to drive out the Rwandan and Ugandan troops that had been fighting in Kisangani, saying that "every chiefdom must have its own people's defence force." He also accused the international community of "complicity" with foreign troops seeking to "subjugate" the DRC. Also on that day, Museveni began a diplomatic tour to explain the fighting, visiting Tanzania's Benjamin Mkapa and South Africa's Thabo Mbeki.

The UPDF stated on 15 June that it intended to unilaterally withdraw northwards to Banalia, 100 km away, and that the withdrawal would be complete "within a week". Humanitarian relief flights to the city were briefly disrupted by UPDF threats to shoot RPA military aircraft at Kisangani's main airport, Bangboka. On 16 June, Rwandan commander in Kisangani Emmanuel Karenzi Karake confirmed that Rwandan withdrawal was ongoing, southwards towards Ubundu. The United Nations Security Council passed a resolution on 19 June, which called on Uganda and Rwanda to "withdraw all their troops from the country’s territory without further delay" and "make reparations for the loss of life and the property damage inflicted on Kisangani’s civilian population". The fighting disrupted the deployment of UN troops into the city, as the main contributing countries that offered to participate in May were changing their position after the second wave of fighting.

Rwandan and Uganda accused each other of detaining their country's citizens following the war. On 20 June, Ugandan official James Wapakhabulo criticized the Rwandan government for parading 28 UPDF prisoners of war at a military camp in Rwanda. RCD–Goma's vice president Jean-Pierre Ondekane blamed the conflict in Kisangani on the arrival of UPDF chief of staff Brig. Gen. James Kazini back in 1998, who he accused of starting a "campaign" against Rwanda. The Ugandan parliament passed eight resolutions on the country's involvement in the DRC on 23 June, one of which called for a total withdrawal, and another that described the Kisangani fighting as "not necessary", in order to restore relations with Rwanda. UN Special Representative Kamel Morjane confirmed the Rwandan withdrawal to 100 km away was completed on 29 June. On that day, Uganda announced that all of its troops had been withdrawn from Kisangani to Banalia, and that MONUC was responsible for security in the city. On 5 July, Museveni said that "mistakes" had been made leading to the "unfortunate clashes in Kisangani", due to "having several armies under multiple commands".

RCD–Goma kept its troops in Kisangani during the demilitarization of the city, and it was reported in the days following the war that additional RCD and MLC troops arrived. On 7 July, RCD–Goma leader Emile Ilunga accepted a partial withdrawal from Kisangani. Ultimately, Rwanda succeeded in expelling Uganda from the city, leaving it in the hands of its local proxy, the RCD–Goma.

== International law ==
In 2005, the International Court of Justice ruled that Uganda was responsible for human rights violations in the DRC, including in Kisangani, and by 2022 the court awarded US$325 million in compensation. Uganda made its first payment in September 2022. In April 2023, the Congolese government set up a national fund to manage the money (Fonds spécial de réparation et d’indemnisation des victimes des activités armées de l’Ouganda, FRIVAO).

== In culture ==
The conflict became known as the Six-Day War. The 2020 documentary film "Downstream to Kinshasa" (French: En route pour le milliard) by director Dieudo Hamadi centers on survivors of the Six-Day War, in which the victims travel to Kinshasa to seek compensation from the government.
