= Ugandan Civil War =

The Ugandan Civil War may refer to:

- Uganda–Tanzania War (1978–1979)
- Ugandan Bush War (1980–1986)
- War in Uganda (1986–1994)
