= Charles Kayonga =

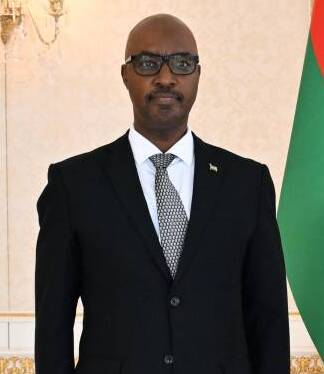
Kayonga, 2024

Lieutenant-General Charles Kayonga (born 1962) is a retired Rwandan soldier and diplomat, who was, until 2019, the Rwandan Ambassador to China. He was formerly Chief of Defence Staff. He attended Makerere University in Kampala, Uganda where he received a Bachelor of Arts Degree. He graduated from the U.S. Army Command and General Staff College at Fort Leavenworth, Kansas. During the Rwandan Civil War, Kayonga held various military appointments and his key career highlights include the fact that he served in various capacities and rose in rank from Platoon Commander to Battalion Commander. He is married to Caroline Rwivanga and has 3 children.
