= Jeje Odongo =

Ugandan politician

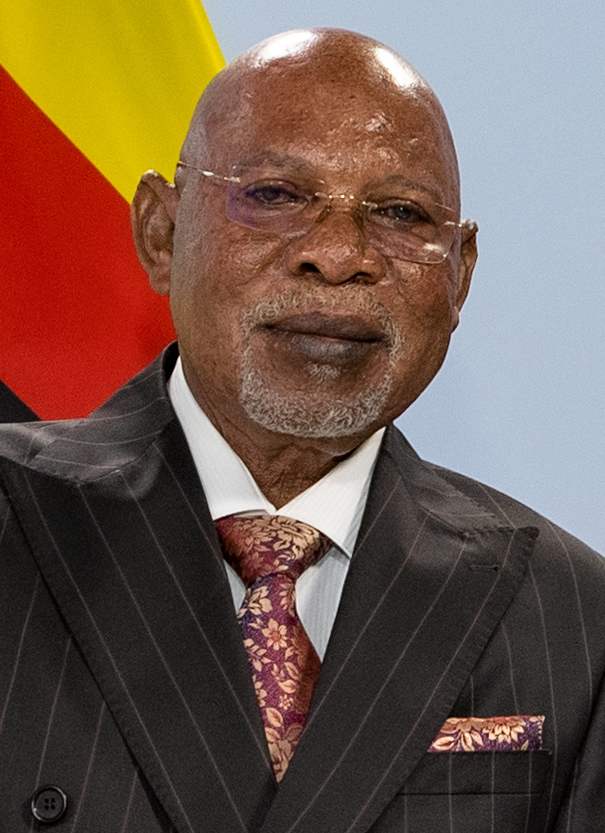
- Jeje Odongo

Minister of Foreign Affairs of Uganda
- Incumbent
- Assumed office 21 June 2021
- Preceded by: Sam Kutesa

Personal details
- Born: 9 July 1951 (age 75) Uganda Protectorate
- Education: Nkumba University (MA in International Relations & Diplomacy)
- Occupation: Politician, military officer

Military service
- Allegiance: Uganda
- Branch/service: Uganda People's Defence Force
- Years of service: 1979–2001
- Rank: Major General
- Battles/wars: Second Congo War

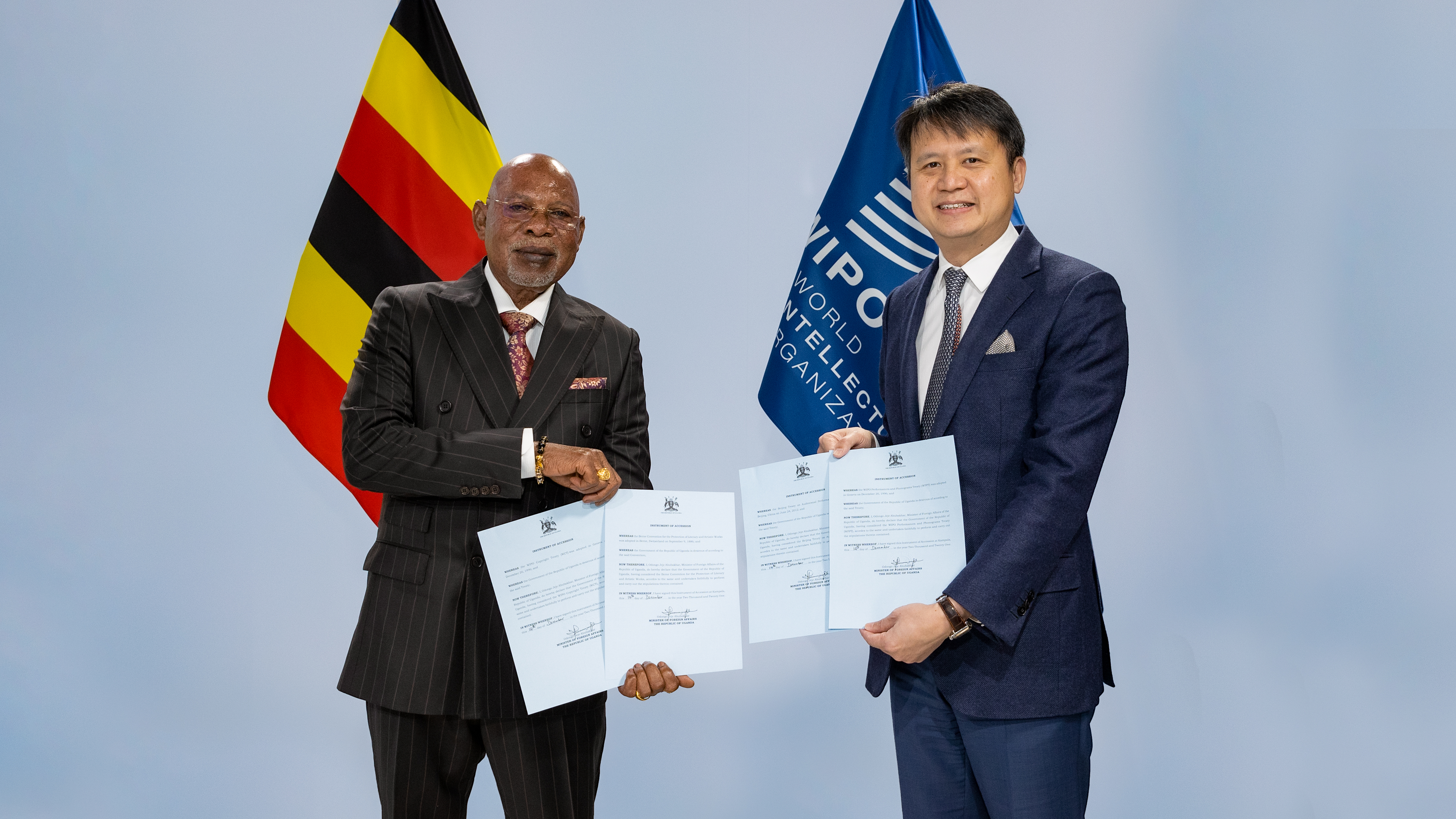
Uganda Joins Four Key WIPO Copyright Treaties

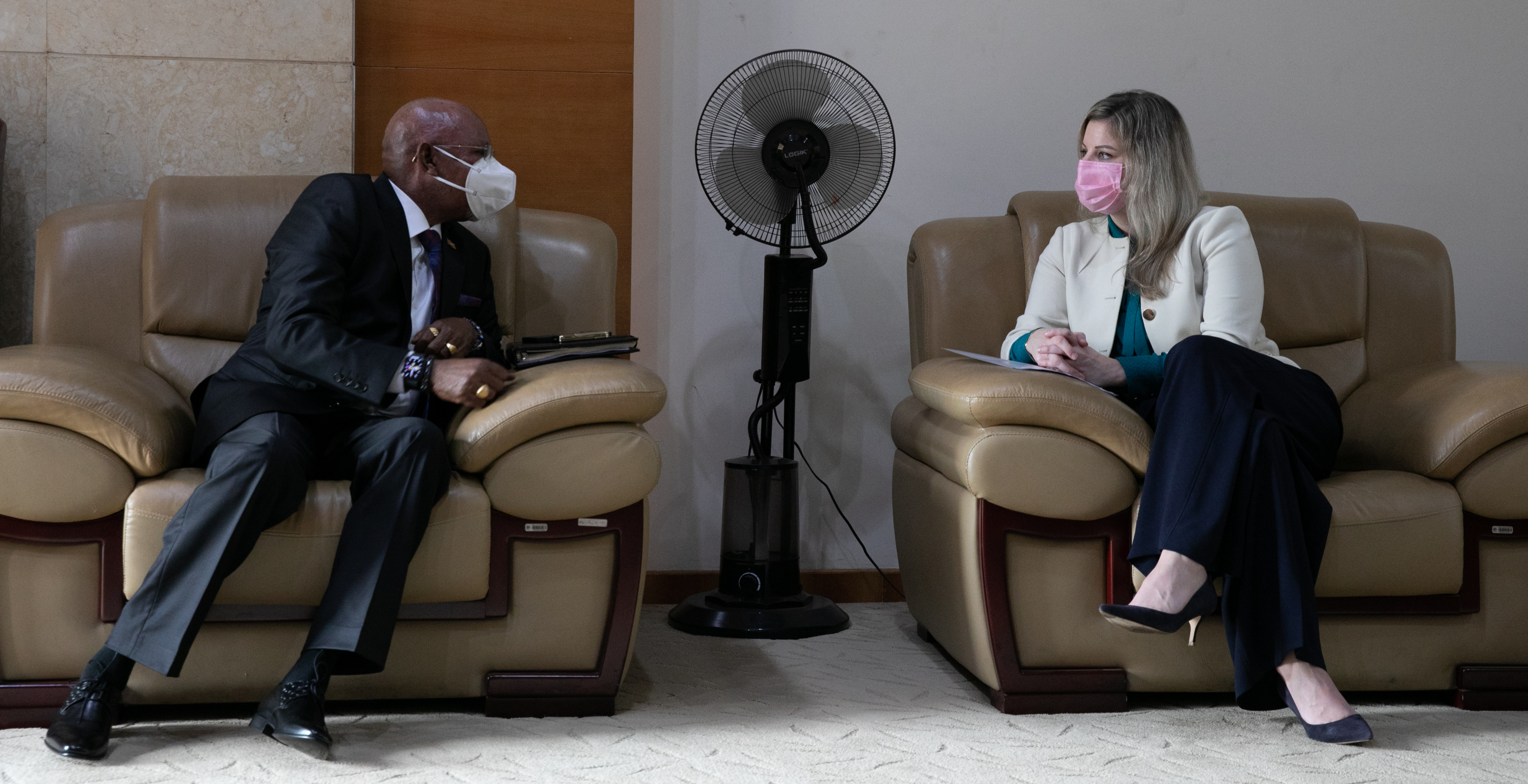
Liesje Schreinemacher visit to Uganda, February 2022

General Haji Abubaker Jeje Odongo (born July 9, 1951) is a Ugandan senior military officer and politician. In June 2021, he was appointed Uganda's cabinet minister for Foreign Affairs.

He served as Minister of Internal Affairs in the Cabinet of Uganda from 2016 to 2022. He was also the Minister of State for Defence in the Ugandan cabinet from February 2009 to June 2016.

== History ==
Jeje Odongo was born in Amuria District, in the Teso sub-region, in Eastern Uganda. He attended secondary school at Ngora High School. He entered the Ugandan army in 1979.

== Politics ==
In 1994, Jeje Odongo was one of the ten army officers who represented the Ugandan military in the Constituent Assembly that drafted the 1995 Ugandan Constitution. In 1996, he was selected to replace Colonel Sserwanga Lwanga as the Political Commissar in the Uganda People's Defense Force (UPDF). Also in 1996, he contested the parliamentary seat for Amuria District in the Ugandan Parliament. He won and was appointed as Minister of Defence soon after he entered parliament.

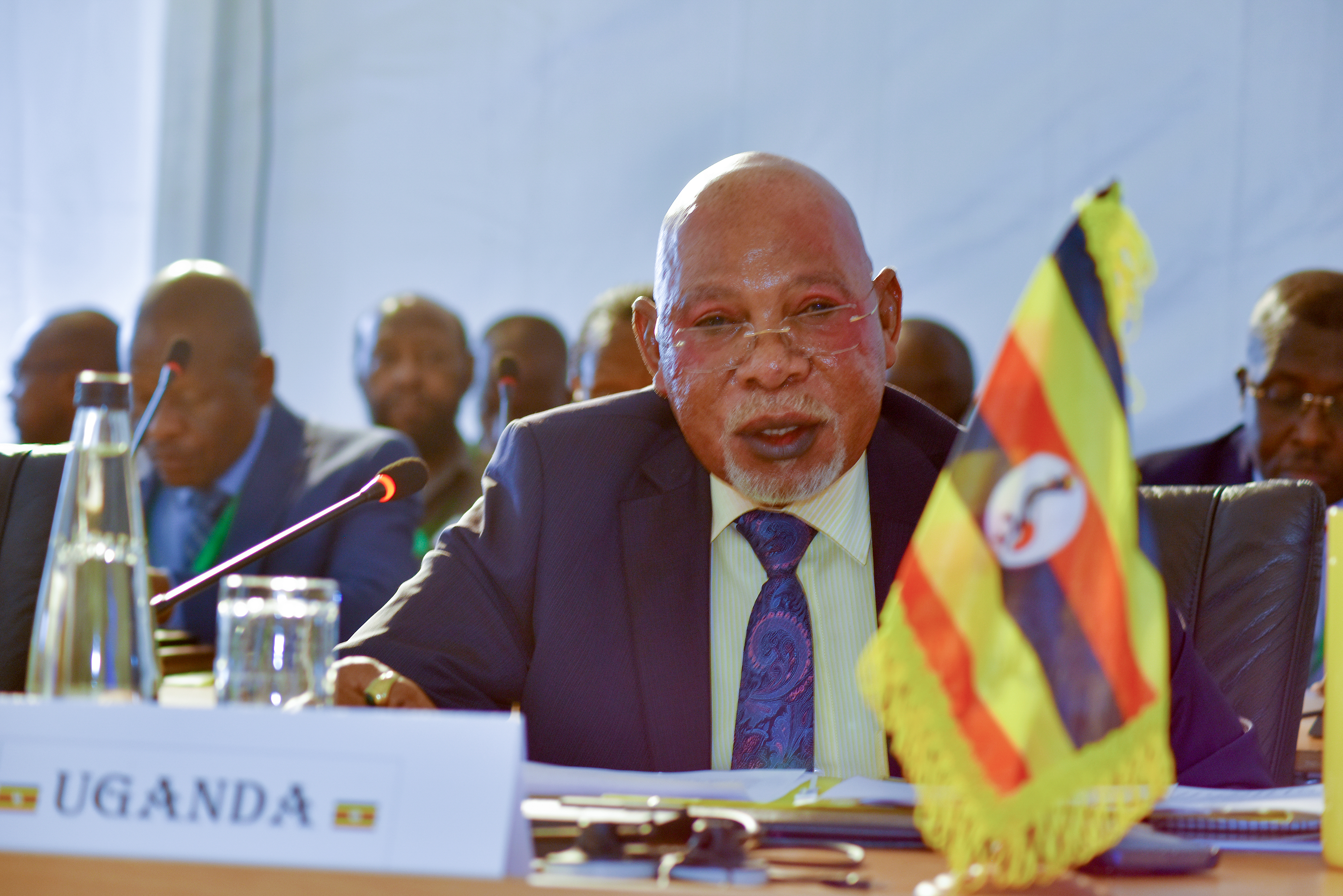
Hon. Jeje Odongo

== As CDF ==
In 1998, he resigned his parliamentary seat and his cabinet position and was appointed Commander of the Army, taking over from Major General Mugisha Muntu. Holding the rank of major general, Jeje Odongo also served as the commander of operations in the Democratic Republic of the Congo (DRC) during Uganda's involvement in the Second Congo War. He frequently spoke with his counterpart in the Rwandan Patriotic Army (RPA), Brigadier General Faustin Kayumba Nyamwasa. He served as army commander until 2001, when he was replaced by Major General James Kazini.

== Ministerial Roles ==
In 2001, he was appointed as Minister without Portfolio, a position he occupied until 2004. In 2004, now at the rank of Lieutenant General, Jeje Odongo was appointed as Minister of State for the Environment.

Between 2001 and 2006, he was one of 10 senior UPDF officers who represented the Ugandan military in the 8th Ugandan Parliament. In May 2008, Jeje Odongo graduated with the degree of Master of Arts in International Relations and Diplomacy from Nkumba University. On 16 February 2009, he was promoted to General and appointed Minister of State for Defence. After seven years in that post, he was instead appointed as Minister of Internal Affairs in the cabinet list announced on 6 June 2016.

== Controversy ==
On 18 February 2022 he participated in the European Union -frican Union Summit in Brussels. A controversy arose when he greeted President of the European Commission, Ursula von der Leyen, only after an intervention by Emmanuel Macron, which was considered a misogynistic attitude.

Military offices
Preceded by Major General Mugisha Muntu	Commander of Uganda People's Defence Force; 1998 - 2001	Succeeded by Major General James Kazini
