= 2020 in East Africa =

The following lists events that happened during 2020 in East Africa. The countries listed are those described in the United Nations geoscheme for East Africa: Burundi, Comoros, Djibouti, Eritrea, Ethiopia, Kenya, Madagascar, Malawi, Mauritius, Mayotte, Mozambique, Réunion, Rwanda, Seychelles, Somalia, South Sudan, Tanzania, Uganda, Zambia, Zimbabwe.

The combined population of these 18 independent countries and two dependent territories is 445,405,606.

== Countries and territories ==
=== Burundi ===
Burundi declared its independence from Belgium as a constitutional monarchy on 1 July 1962 and became the Republic of Burundi in 1965. Over the years the country has suffered through political instability including two civil wars and two instances of genocide. The political capital is Gitega and the economic capital is Bujumbura.

- Chief of state and Head of government: President
  - Pierre Nkurunziza (26 August 2005) to 8 June 2020 (died in office)
  - Évariste Ndayishimiye, starting 18 June.
- First Vice President Gaston Sindimwo (since 20 August 2015)
- Second Vice President Joseph Butore (since 20 August 2015)

=== Comoros ===
Comoros consists of three main islands and several smaller islands in the Indian Ocean. (Note: Comoros also claims the island of Mayotte.) Comoros became independent of France on 6 July 1975. The capital of the Union of Comoros is Moroni.

- Chief of state and Head of government: President Azali Assoumani (since 26 May 2016)

=== Djibouti ===
Djibouti is located at the Bab-el-Mandeb strait between the Red Sea and the Gulf of Aden. It is Africa's smallest country. Called the French Territory of the Afars and the Issas from 1967 until its independence on 27 June 1977, the capital of the Republic of Djibouti is Djibouti City.

- Chief of state: President Ismail Omar Guelleh (since 8 May 1999)
- Head of government: Prime Minister Abdoulkader Kamil Mohamed (since 1 April 2013)

=== Eritrea ===
Eritrea became independent on 24 May 1993, after a thirty-year struggle. Sporadic fighting continued over the years, resulting in the Eritrean–Ethiopian War that only ended in 2018. The capital of the State of Eritrea is Asmara.

- Chief of state and Head of government: President Isaias Afwerki (since 8 June 1993)

=== Ethiopia ===
Ethiopia is one of the world's oldest countries; with a civilisation stretching back to 1000 BC. Even though, it was occupied by Italy for five years, as the Italian Ethiopia in the early 20th century, after a difficult struggle during the Second Italo-Ethiopian War, it is regained its independence after World War II. It is thus the only country in Africa to have never been fully colonised. After the downfall of the Monarchy in 1974, it became the People's Democratic Republic of Ethiopia and the "Federal Democratic Republic of Ethiopia" in 1991. Ethiopia has gone through costly drought and a bloody war with Eritrea in recent years. The capital is Addis Ababa.

- Chief of state: President Sahle-Work Zewde (since 25 October 2018) Sahle-Work is the first female elected chief of state in Ethiopia; she is currently the only female president in Africa.
- Head of government:Prime Minister Abiy Ahmed (since 2 April 2018)
  - Deputy Prime Minister Demeke Mekonnen (since 29 November 2012)

=== Kenya ===
Kenya became independent of the United Kingdom on 12 December 1963; it became the "Republic of Kenya" a year later. The capital is Nairobi.

- Chief of state and Head of government: President Uhuru Kenyatta (since 9 April 2013)
  - Deputy President: William Ruto (since 9 April 2013)

=== Madagascar ===
Madagascar freed itself from the French colonial empire in 1960; its official name is the "Republic of Madagascar" and its capital is Antananarivo.

- Chief of state: President Andry Rajoelina (since 21 January 2019)
- Head of government: Prime Minister Christian Ntsay (since 6 June 2018)

=== Malawi ===
Malawi was called Nyasaland until 1953 when it became part of Federation of Rhodesia and Nyasaland. In 1964, Nyasaland became an independent country within the Commonwealth with the new name Malawi. In 1966 it became the "Republic of Malawi". The capital is Lilongwe.

- Chief of state and Head of government: President
  - Peter Mutharika (until 6 July 2020) (Note: Due to irregularities in 21 May 2019 election, on 3 February 2020, a panel of five judges annulled the results and ordered new elections within 150 days.)
  - Lazarus Chakwera (starting 6 July 2020)
- Vice-President Saulos Chilima (since 3 February 2020)

=== Mauritius ===
Mauritius is a group of islands in the Indian Ocean that became independent within the Commonwealth on 12 March 1968. It became the "Republic of Mauritius" on 12 March 1992. The capital is Port Louis. (Note: Mauritius claims sovereignty over the Chagos Archipelago (including Diego Garcia), although this claim is disputed by the UK.)

- Chief of state: President Prithvirajsing Roopun (since December 2019)
- Head of government: Prime Minister Pravind Jugnauth (since 23 January 2017) Jugnauth also became Defense Minister on 7 November 2019.

=== Mayotte ===
Mayotte is an overseas department and region of France. (Note: Mayotte is also claimed by Comoros.)

- Chief of state: President of France Emmanuel Macron (since 14 May 2017)
- Head of government: Prime Minister of France Édouard Philippe (since 15 May 2017)
- President of the Departmental Council Soibahadine Ibrahim Ramadani (since 2 April 2015)

=== Mozambique ===
Mozambique was colonized by Portugal from 1505 to 1975. The People's Republic of Mozambique was founded on 25 June 1975; after the Mozambican Civil War it joined the Commonwealth in 1995 and later became the "Republic of Mozambique." The capital is Maputo.

- Chief of state: President Filipe Nyusi (since 15 January 2015)
- Head of government: Prime Minister Carlos Agostinho do Rosário (since 17 January 2015)

=== Réunion ===
Réunion is an overseas department and region of France, first colonized in the 17th century. The capital is Saint-Dennis.

- Chief of state: President Emmanuel Macron (since 14 May 2017)
- Head of government: Prime Minister of France Édouard Philippe (since 15 May 2017)
- President of the Regional Council Didier Robert (since 26 March 2010)

=== Rwanda ===
Rwanda became independent of Belgium on 1 July 1962. The Republic of Rwanda is a member of the AU, the Commonwealth, COMESA, OIF, and the East African Community. Its capital is Kigali.

- Chief of state: President Paul Kagame (since 22 April 2000)
- Head of government: Prime Minister Édouard Ngirente (since 30 August 2017)

=== Seychelles ===
Seychelles consists of about 115 islands in the Indian Ocean. The country became independent of the UK on 29 June 1976. The Republic of Seychelles is a member of the UN, the AU, the Southern African Development Community (SADC), and the Commonwealth. The capital, Victoria, is located on the island of Mahé.

- Chief of state and Head of government: President
  - Danny Faure (28 October 2016—25 October 2020)
  - Wavel Ramkalawan (starting 26 October).
- Vice-President
  - Vincent Meriton (28 October 2016—26 October 2020)
  - Ahmed Afif (starting 26 October 2020)

=== Somalia ===
Somalia was formed by the merger of British Somaliland and the Trust Territory of Somaliland in 1960. It was the Somali Democratic Republic from 1969 to 1991, when the Somali Civil War broke out. The Federal Republic of Somalia is a member of the UN, the Arab League, AU, Non-Aligned Movement (NAM), and the OIC. The capital is Mogadishu.

- Chief of state: President Mohamed Abdullahi Mohamed (since 8 February 2017)
- Head of government: Prime Minister
  - Hassan Ali Khaire (1 March 2017 to July 2020)
  - Mohamed Hussein Roble (starting 18 September)

==== Somaliland ====
Somaliland is the self-proclaimed successor to the State of Somaliland and claims independence from Somalia. Its capital is Hargeisa. The Republic does not enjoy international recognition and in 1998 a region in the northeast, the Puntland, declared itself "autonomous."

- Chief of state and head of government: President Muse Bihi Abdi
  - Vice President: Abdirahman Saylici
- Speaker of the House: Bashe Mohamed Farah

=== South Sudan ===
South Sudan

- Chief of state and Head of government: President Salva Kiir (since 9 July 2011) (Note: (12 February 2020): A peace agreement among warring parties was extended to February 2020 but implementation has been stalled.)
  - First Vice-President Taban Deng Gai (since 26 July 2016)
  - Second Vice President James Wani Igga (since 26 April 2016)

=== Tanzania ===
Tanzania

- Chief of state and Head of government: President John Magufuli (since 5 November 2015)
  - Vice-President Samia Suluhu (since 5 November 2015)
- Head of government: Prime Minister Kassim Majaliwa (since 20 November 2015)

=== Uganda ===
Uganda

- Chief of state: President, Yoweri Museveni (since 26 January 1988)
  - Vice President: Edward Ssekandi (since 24 May 2011)
- Head of government: Prime Minister Ruhakana Rugunda (since 19 September 2014)
  - First Deputy Prime Minister: Moses Ali (since 6 June 2016)
  - Second Deputy Prime Minister Kirunda Kivenjinja (since 6 June 2016)

=== Zambia ===
Zambia

- Chief of state and Head of government: President, Edgar Lungu (since 25 January 2015)
  - Vice-President Inonge Wina (since 26 January 2015)

=== Zimbabwe ===
Zimbabwe

- Chief of state: President Emmerson Mnangagwa (since 24 November 2017)
  - Vice-President Constantino Chiwenga (since 28 December 2017)

== Monthly events ==
=== January ===
- 1 January – New Year's Day
- 2 January – New Year holiday, Seychelles
- 7 January – Orthodox Tewahedo Christmas in Ethiopia and Eritrea
- 8 January – The United States announces sanctions against First Vice President Taban Deng Gai of South Sudan for human rights violations.
- 12 January – Zanzibar Revolution Day, Tanzania
- 13 January
  - Two journalists are arrested in Comoros.
  - China promises to strengthen ties with Burundi.
- 15 January – John Chilembwe Day, Malawi
- 19 January
  - Timkat, celebration of Epiphany in Ethiopia and Eritrea
  - Djibouti rejects an arbitration agreement that would give United Arab Emirates company DP World complete control over Dolareh Port Terminal.
  - 2020 Comorian legislative election (first round) It was a landslide victory for President Azali Assoumani's Convention for the Renewal of the Comoros.
- 25 January – Chinese New Year, Mauritius
- 29 January – The East African Community (EAC) announces that it is in the process of developing a common currency by 2024.
- 31 January – Four journalists are sentenced to 30-month jail sentences in Burundi.

=== February ===
- 1 February
  - Abolition of Slavery, Mauritius
  - Heroes' Day, Rwanda
  - Kenyan blood banks run dry after the United States cuts off aid.
  - The East African Community reviews its treaty.
- 2 February
  - At least 40 people are killed in a stampede at a church in Moshi, Tanzania.
  - An air raid by United States Africa Command kills at least five civilians and one member of al Shabaab terrorist near Jilib, Somalia.
- 3 February
  - Heroes' Day, Mozambique
  - Human Rights Watch denounces Tanzania for denying adequate health services to LGBT people.
- 4 February – Two television reporters have been suspended for covering strikes in Comoros.
- 5 February
  - Unity Day, Burundi
  - Ugandan climate activist Vanessa Nakate, 23, complains about racism as she is cropped out of a photo published by the Associated Press in which she originally appeared with Greta Thunberg, Isabelle Axelsson, Luisa Neubauer and Loukina Tille at the World Economic Forum in Davos, Switzerland. "Africans have truly been erased from the map of climate action," Nakate tweeted. AP said they will expand their diversity training for employees.
- 9 February
  - Swarms of locusts are seen in Uganda and Tanzania.
  - Kenya and Djibouti dispute over United Nations Security Council seat.
- 10 February – There still is no agreement in South Sudan over the number and boundaries of its states. A week later talks are still stalled.
- 11 February – Kenya and the FBI sign an anti-terrorist agreement, the first of its kind outside the United States.
- 12 February
  - PowerChina International Group Limited (PIGL) applies for a permit to build a US$1.2 dam and power plant between Lake Kyoga and Lake Albert in Uganda.
  - A report on wildlife censuses conducted in October 2018 and November 2018 in the Selous-Mikumi ecosystem in Tanzania indicates that populations of elephants, hippopotamuses, and zebras have increased and that poaching has been brought under control.
- 13 February
  - The African Development Bank gives Uganda US$1 million to fight Ebola.
  - The atoll of Aldabra in the Seychelles is designated an Important Marine Mammal Area (IMMA) because of its rare dugong breeding population.
  - Rosemary DiCarlo, the UN Under-Secretary for Political Affairs and Peace-building Affairs, meets with Prime Minister Abdallah Hamdok and Lt. Gen. Abdelfattah El Burhan of Somalia in Khartoum.
  - The United Nations Security Council schedules a meeting on Somalia later this month.
  - The government of South Sudan is accused of ignoring four reports linking oil pollution and birth defects in Upper Nile and Unity states.
- 14 February – U.S. Secretary of State Mike Pompeo begins a visit to Senegal, Angola, and Ethiopia.
- 15 February – Six mass graves with 6,000 bodies are found in Karuzi Province, Burundi.
- 19 February – Locust swarms spread from Uganda to South Sudan.
- 20 February
  - The Netherlands returns a stolen crown to the government of Ethiopia.
  - The government and rebels reach a peace agreement in South Sudan.
- 21 February
  - Maha Shivaratri, Hindu festival in honour of Lord Shiva, Mauritius
  - Robert Gabriel Mugabe National Youth Day, Zimbabwe
- 24 February – The United States shifts its military mission in Africa to training as American lawmakers oppose troop reductions.
- 29 February – Egypt says it will use "all means" to defend its interests in a dispute with Ethiopia and Sudan over a dam on the Nile River.

=== March ===
- 2 March – Victory at Adwa Day, Ethiopia
- 3 March – Martyrs' Day
- 8 March – International Women's Day and Labour Day
- 12 March
  - Independence and Republic Day, Mauritius
  - Youth Day, Zambia
  - At least 18 African countries, including Ethiopia, Kenya, and Sudan report cases of the novel coronavirus. Most are in single figures, and no deaths have been reported in Sub-Saharan Africa. All major public events and air travel have been restricted in Kenya. Sudan stops issuing visas for, and flights to, eight countries, including Italy and Egypt, over fears of the coronavirus outbreak.
- 13 March – Malawi's president dissolves his cabinet in an attempt to prevent a new election.
- 15 March – In a historic first, all Peace Corps volunteers worldwide are withdrawn from their host countries.
- 16 March – Oppah Muchinguri, Zimbabwe's defence minister, describes the coronavirus pandemic as God's way of punishing the United States and other Western nations for imposing sanctions on Zimbabwe. Zimbabwe has not yet recorded a case of COVID-19 but South Africa has more than 60 cases and 54 countries in Africa have reported cases.
- 20 March – Zimbabwe reports its first case of COVID-19, a 38-year-old who had traveled to Great Britain on 7 March, returning home via neighboring South Africa on 15 March. Madagascar also reports its first case. Thirty-nine countries in Africa now have cases, with a total now well above 900.
- 24 March – Ahlu Sunnah Wa-Jama insurgents destroyed houses, vandalized public spaces, and erected barricades along important roads in Mocímboa da Praia, Cabo Delgado Province, Mozambique.
- 25 March – At least 60 people believed to be migrants from Ethiopia are found dead in a cargo container in Tete, Mozambique.
- 27 March
  - Police in Kenya use tear gas at a crowd of commuters trying to reach a ferry before a 7 p.m. curfew went into place; others were beaten with batons. 38 people in Kenya are infected with COVID-19
  - Police in Rwanda deny killing two civilians for ignoring the country-wide lockdown that went into effect on 23 March; they say the men were shot because they attacked the police. A lockdown in Zimbabwe is due to go into effect on 30 March.
- 29 March – Martyrs' Day, Madagascar

=== April ===
- 1 April – Billions of locusts have destroyed 173,000 acres (70,000 hectares) in Kenya and other East African countries since December 2019.
- 6 April – Cyprien Ntaryamira Day, Burundi
- 7 April
  - Women's Day, Mozambique
  - Genocide Memorial Day
  - Abeid Karume Day, Tanzania
- 8 April – A Spanish-Eritrean group has discovered the remains of million-year-old fossil remains of large animals and plants along with tools that will help us better understand the climate and ecology of the Engel Ela-Ramud area during the Pleistocene Epoch.
- 10 April – Good Friday, Western Christian holiday
- 11 April – Moussa Faki, Chairperson of the African Union Commission, invites the Chinese ambassador to the AU to discuss allegations of discrimination and mistreatment of hundreds of Africans in Guangzhou, southern China.
- 13 April
  - Easter Monday, Western Christian holiday
  - 14,000 cases of COVID-19 and 788 deaths have been reported across Africa. Cases by country: Comoros (0), Djibouti (214), Eritrea (34), Ethiopia (71), Kenya (197), Madagascar (106), Malawi (13), Mauritius (324), Mozambique (21), Rwanda (126), São Tomé and Príncipe (4), Somalia (25), South Sudan (4), Tanzania (32), Uganda (54), Zambia (43), and Zimbabwe (14).
- 15 April – Finance ministers from the Group of 20 agree to put a hold on debt service by poor countries so they can concentrate their efforts on health service and ending the pandemic. 76 countries will be able to participate in the plan, including 40 from Sub-Saharan Africa. $8 billion in private loans and $12 billion in loans from other countries will be frozen for the remainder of 2020 and possibly beyond. Another $12 billion in multilateral loans from organizations such as the World Bank is also under consideration.
- 17 April
  - Considerable fake news about the coronavirus is circulating in Africa.
  - About 300 people at the Gashora emergency transit center near Kigali, Rwanda, protest against stay-at-home orders. The refugees had been relocated from overcrowded camps in Libya and many have been cleared for migration to countries such as Norway or Canada. The new orders, issued to prevent the spread of the coronavirus, prevent international travel, and they restrict the ability of interns to play football or attend religious services.
- 18 April – Independence Day, Zimbabwe
- 22 April
  - Kenya plans to hunt down approximately 50 individuals who escaped from a quarantine center in Nairobi.
  - The World Health Organization (WHO) warns that the number of malaria deaths in Africa may double this year as efforts to curb the disease wind down.
- 24 April – One million people in Ethiopia face hunger due to crop destruction by locust swarms. 25 million people in six states are struggling to feed themselves and a further five million could be threatened by hunger if the locust invasion was not contained. Swarms have been reported in Ethiopia, Eritrea, Djibouti, Somalia, Kenya, Uganda, South Sudan, and Tanzania.
- 26 April – Union Day, the unification of Tanganyika and the People's Republic of Zanzibar in 1964, Tanzania
- 27 April – The World Food Program (WFP) and the Food and Agriculture Organization (FAO) said in a report that more than 4 million rural people, about a third of Zimbabwe's population, "are in need of urgent action," to deal with food shortages.
- 28 April – Madagascar President Andry Rajoelina promotes drinking a herbal extract called ″Covid Organics″ as schools reopen despite no scientific evidence that it is effective. Madagascar has 128 recorded cases of COVID-19 but no deaths.
- 29 April – Kenya bans movement in and out of two huge refugee camps housing 400,000 people as part of containment measures aimed at preventing the spread of the coronavirus among the vulnerable communities.
- 30 April – Comoros confirms its first COVID-19 case. A healthcare worker who did not wish to give her name told AFP news agency the announcement came "rather late". "Only one positive case? The president is funny. The [real] number is much higher," she said.

=== May ===
- 1 May – International Workers' Day
  - Kenyan President Uhuru Kenyatta pushes back against criticism for sending flowers to Britain's National Health Service (NHS) by noting the importance of flower exportations to Kenya's economy.
- 3 May – COVID-19 pandemic: Tanzanian President John Magufuli questions coronavirus tests after samples from a goat, a pawpaw, and a sheep tested positive. Tanzania reports 480 cases of COVID-19 and 17 deaths.
- 4 May – A civilian Kenyan plane carrying medical supplies to Bay, Somalia crashes, killing six.
- 6 May
  - Somalian-born U.S. Congresswoman Ilhan Omar (D-MN) demands that United States Africa Command (AFRICOM) explain why it has reported only four civilian deaths in the 227 declared actions the U.S. has conducted in Somalia since 2007. Other organizations report as many as 142 civilian deaths due to U.S. airstrikes.
  - Kenyan officials say at least 194 people have been killed and 100,000 have been made in flooding over the past three weeks. At least 65 people have been killed by floods and landslides in Rwanda.
- 8 May
  - Bereket Simon, former Communications Minister for the Ethiopian People's Revolutionary Democratic Front, is convicted of corruption and sentenced to six years of prison. Tadesse Kassa, a former TIRET Corporation board member, is also convicted.
  - A hospital in Kilembe, Uganda and a small town Somalia are washed away in flooding; an unspecified number of people are killed. Hundreds of people have been killed by floodwaters in Kenya, Uganda, Somalia, Rwanda, and Ethiopia which have also displaced hundreds of thousands across the region.
  - Hundreds protest when the government destroys 7,000 homes and a market in Kariobangi, Kenya. At least six people have been killed for violating stay-at-home orders, while hundreds have been forced into quarantine.
- 12 May – Sudan pushes Ethiopia to resume discussion related to the $4.6 billion Grand Ethiopian Renaissance Dam on the Nile River that officials say will start filling in July.
- 13 May – Balloons floating 12 miles over Niassa and Cabo Delgado provinces in northern Mozambique are planned to provide the region with stable internet connections, according to Google's parent company, Alphabet Inc., and local mobile telecoms provider Vodacom.
- 14 May
  - Hastings Banda Birthday, Malawi
  - Four members of the World Health Organization are expelled from Burundi.
  - The U.S. Embassy in Dar es Salaam says that hospitals in Tanzania are ″overwhelmed″ because of the COVID-19 pandemic.
- 15 May – Three young, female opposition activists were reported missing following a protest in Harare, Zambia, over COVID-19 lockdown measures. They were later treated at a hospital after asserting they had been abducted and sexually abused by suspected state security agents.
- 16 May
  - Sudan People's Liberation Army Day, South Sudan
  - Kenya closes its borders with Somalia and Tanzania.
  - Félicien Kabuga, 84, Africa's most wanted fugitive for his role in the Rwandan genocide, is arrested in the outskirts of Paris.
- 18 May – Flooding in central Somalia affects nearly one million people, displacing about 400,000. At least 24 people have died.
- 19 May
  - Laylat al-Qadr, Islamic "Night of Decree"
  - COVID-19 pandemic: Rwanda releases 52 young women jailed for having or aiding abortions. A total of a total of 3,596 inmates have been granted "conditional release" from prison in order to reduce the number of inmates and prevent the spread of the coronavirus.
- 20 May – 2020 Burundian general election Evariste Ndayishimiye, 52, wins with 69% of the vote and will not face a second-round of voting. President Pierre Nkurunziza will step down and be granted the title ″Supreme Guide.″
- 21 May – Ascension of Jesus, Western Christian holiday
- 24 May
  - Eid al-Fitr, end of Ramadan
  - Independence Day, Eritrea
- 25 May – Zimbabwe offers 100% ownership of farms for marijuana cultivation.
- 28 May
  - Derg Downfall Day, Ethiopia (defeat of Mengistu regime)
  - Ladislas Ntaganzwa is sentenced to life imprisonment for his role in the 1994 Rwandan genocide.
  - COVID-19 pandemic: Hundreds of people in quarantine in Zimbabwe and Malawi escape; some have confirmed cases of coronavirus.
- 29 May
  - Amnesty International accuses Ethiopian security forces of 39 extrajudicial executions of members of the Oromo Liberation Front.
  - Eight ″very young″ aid workers are kidnapped and killed by an armed group near Mogadishu.
  - COVID-19 pandemic: Denise Bucumi, First Lady of Burundi, is flown to Nairobi for treatment for coronavirus. Burundi officially has 42 cases and 17 deaths due to the virus, but it stopped counting on 17 May and the actual numbers may be much higher.
  - The UN extends an arms embargo and travel restrictions on South Sudan for another year.

=== June ===
- 1 June
  - Madaraka Day, (marks the day Kenya attained internal self-rule)
  - Whit Monday, Western Christian holiday
- 2 June
  - President Yoweri Museveni predicts Uganda will lose US$1.6 billion in tourism revenues due to the COVID-19 pandemic.
  - People in Nairobi protests against police brutality after a homeless man is killed for violating curfew.
  - At least six elephants are killed by poachers outside Mago National Park, Ethiopia in the largest mass-killing of animals in the country's history.
- 3 June
  - Uganda Martyrs, Anglican and Catholic holiday
  - Feast of Corpus Christi, Seychelles
  - A French court hands Felicien Kabuga to the United Nations for trial in Tanzania on charges of genocide.
- 5 June – Rijasoa Andriamanana, the Education Minister of Madagascar, is fired after spending $2million (£1.6million) on candy for children to mask the "bitter" aftertaste of an untested herbal remedy for coronavirus.
- 7 June – COVID-19 pandemic: Tanzania President John Magufuli claims God has "removed" the coronavirus and the country has only four cases; the country last reported 509 cases six weeks ago.
- 8 June
  - Burundi President Pierre Nkurunziza dies and seven days of mourning are declared.
  - Ethiopian Prime Minister Abiy Ahmed rejects the idea of forming a transitional government in anticipation of the October election.
  - Residents of one of Nairobi's poorest areas held a peaceful protest over the police brutality and killings which have plagued their neighborhood in recent years. Kenya's Independent Police Oversight Authority said that while enforcing the curfew police have killed 15 people and are accused of 31 cases of torture and injuring people.
- 9 June
  - Tanzania opposition leader Freeman Mbowe (Chadema) is shot outside his home Dodoma City.
  - A statue of King Leopold II of Belgium is knocked over in Ekeren, Antwerp, Belgium by protesters who object to his ties to colonialism in the Congo Free State.
- 10 June – Zimbabwe's National Security Council (NSC) denies rumors of a coup d'etat attempt.
- 12 June
  - Four poachers are arrested for killing an endangered gorilla in Bwindi Impenetrable National Park, Uganda.
  - Three young women activists who say they were abducted and sexually assaulted by government forces in Zimbabwe face up to twenty years in prison for lying and trying to destabilize the government.
  - World Day Against Child Labor: The International Labour Organization and UNICEF warn that millions of children are likely to be pushed into forced labor because of the economic fallout from the COVID-19 pandemic.
  - A Burundi court declares that Évariste Ndayishimiye should be sworn in as soon as possible, although no date is set.
- 17 to 20 June – Egyptian hackers engage in cyberattacks against Ethiopia's security forces.
- 18 June – Constitution Day, Seychelles
- 20 June – Martyrs' Day, Eritrea
- 23 June – 2020 Malawian presidential election
- 25 June – Independence Day, Mozambique
- 26 June
  - Independence Day, Madagascar
  - Independence Day, Somalia
  - Egypt, Sudan, and Ethiopia agree to delay filling the Grand Ethiopian Renaissance Dam (GERD).
  - Three people are killed in Lessos, Kenya after a police officer shoots into a crowd of people protesting the use of facemasks and police shakedowns.
  - Rwanda says three of its soldiers were injured in Nyaruguru District in an attack originating in Burundi.
- 27 June – Independence Day, Djibouti
- 28 June – 166 people, including 156 civilians and eleven security forces, are killed in riots in Oromia Region and Addis Ababa, Ethiopia, after the murder of Hachalu Hundessa
- 29 June – Independence Day, Seychelles

=== July ===
- 1 July
  - Independence Day, Burundi
  - Independence Day, Rwanda
  - Foundation of the Somali Republic, Somalia
- 2 July – 2020 Malawian general election Opposition alliance leader Lazarus Chakwera, 65, wins with 58.57% of the vote.
- 4 July
  - Liberation Day, Rwanda
  - Newly elected President Lazarus Chakwera of Malawi warns "We have a situation" as cases of COVID-19 in Africa soar to 1,400, half in the last three weeks.
- 6 July
  - Independence Day, Comoros
  - Independence Day/Republic Day, Malawi Newly elected President Lazarus Chakwera is inaugurated in a televised ceremony after the ceremony was moved to the Kamuzu Barracks after reports of the worsening of the coronavirus pandemic. Malawi has 1,742 reported cases of the virus.
  - Heroes' Day, and Zambia International Trade Fair, Zambia
  - Burundi launches mass testing for the virus.
  - 12 nurses are arrested as thousands protest in Zimbabwe against poor working conditions.
- 7 July
  - Unity Day, Zambia
  - Zimbabwe settles a ten-year-old land dispute with 3,200 evicted white farmers for £2.8 billion, half its value.
- 9 July – Independence Day, South Sudan
- 13 July – A civilian is killed during an assassination attempt on Somalia Gen. Odowa Yusuf Rage.
- 19 July – 105,000 people have been arrested for violations of regulations related to the COVID-19 pandemic, including 1,000 arrests for face mask violations in the last two days in Zimbabwe. 1,500 infections have been reported.
- 21 July – The African Development Fund (ADF) approves UA100.4 million (US$138 million) crisis budget support for Malawi, Madagascar, Mozambique and São Tomé and Príncipe.
- 22 July – Ugandan activist Bobi Wine starts a new political party, the National Unity Platform, ahead of the 2021 Ugandan presidential election.
- 24 July – South Sudanese activist Peter Biar Ajak, 36, flees to the United States after hiding in Kenya for three weeks.
- 30 July
  - Muharram, Islamic New Year
  - Martyrs' Day, South Sudan
- 31 July – Eid al-Adha, Islamic "Festival of the Sacrifice"

=== August ===
- 1 August – Kenya plans to reopen Jomo Kenyatta International Airport in Nairobi and Moi International Airport in Mombasa. Seychelles and Rwanda plan to open air flights the same day.
- 7 August
  - Umuganura Day, also called Thanksgiving Day or National harvest day, Rwanda
  - Mauritius declares a state of emergency after a Japanese-owned ship spills 4,000 tons of fuel.
- 8 August – France sends teams and equipment to Mauritius to clean up 7 August MV Wakashio oil spill.
- 10 August
  - At least ten people are killed in protests for autonomy for the Wolaita people in Ethiopia.
  - Zimbabwe Heroes' Day
- 11 August
  - Defence Forces Day, Zimbabwe
  - Fifteen prisoners and five soldiers are killed when al-Shabab militants try to break out of a prison in Mogadishu, Somalia.
- 12 August
  - The port of Mocimboa da Praia, Mozambique, is taken over by the Islamic State.
  - The Somalian parliament debates legalization of child marriage and forced marriage.
- 15 August – Assumption of Mary, Western Christian holiday
- 16 August
  - The Catholic bishops of Zimbabwe condemn the government for human rights violations.
  - At least 15 people die and 35 are injured after a car bomb explodes in Mogadishu, Somalia.
- 18 August – The Somali elephant shrew is rediscovered in Djibouti.
- 22 August – Ganesh Chaturthi, Hindu festival celebrating the arrival of Ganesha to earth, Mauritius
- 25 August – The WHO reports wild polio eradication in Africa. The announcement was made by Tedros Adhanom Ghebreyesus and Matshidiso Moeti of WHO, Aliko Dangote, and Bill Gates.
- 28 and 29 August – Ashura, in Sunni Islam, marks the day Husayn ibn Ali was martyred in the Battle of Karbala; celebrated in Somalia
- 29 August – 2020 Ethiopian general election, postponed due to COVID-19 pandemic
- 30 August – MV Wakashio oil spill: Thousands march in Port Louis, Mauritius, in protest against handling of the 25 July oil spill, which has resulted in the deaths of 30 dolphins.
- 31 August
  - Ethiopia asks for clarification of a reported US$130 million cut in aid by the United States.
  - Rwandan genocide: Paul Rusesabagina, who inspired the 1994 movie Hotel Rwanda, is arrested on terrorism charges.

=== September ===
- 1 September – Eritrea Revolution Day
- 6 – 13 September – At least thirty people including children are killed by armed militiamen in Benishangul-Gumuz Region.
- 7 September
  - Victory Day, Mozambique
  - The World Food Programme warns of possible hunger in southern and southeastern Africa, particularly in Zimbabwe and Mozambique.
- 12 September – MV Wakashio oil spill: Thousands march in Port Louis to protest the government's handling of the July oil spill in Mauritius.
- 17 September – The U.N. warns that record flooding and locust swarms threaten food security in South Sudan, Ethiopia, and Sudan.
- 18 September – Mohamed Hussein Roble is named Prime Minister of Somalia.
- 19 September – Jawar Mohammed and 23 other Ethiopian dissidents are charged with terrorism.
- 28 September – Meskel, Feast of the Cross in Ethiopia and Eritrea

=== October ===
- 4 October – Day of Peace and Reconciliation, Mozambique
- 9 October – Independence Day, Uganda
- 10 October – Moi Day, Kenya
- 13 October – Louis Rwagasore Day, Burundi
- 15 October – Mother's Day, Malawi; also World Rural Women's Day
- 18 October – National Prayer Day, Zambia
- 20 October – Mashujaa Day, Kenya
- 21 October – Ndadaye Day, Burundi
- 22–24 October – 2020 Seychellois general election: Won by Wavel Ramkalawan.
- 24 October – Independence Day, Zambia
- 28 October – 2020 Tanzanian general election Won by incumbent John Magufuli. After opposition complains of irregularities, Magufuli says, "Freedom, rights and democracy go with responsibility and each has limits."
- 30 October – Milad un Nabi, The Prophet's birthday

=== November ===
- 1 November – All Saints' Day, Western Christian holiday
- 2 November – Arrival of Indentured Labourers Day, Mauritius
- 3 November – Milad un Nabi, The Prophet's birthday (Shia)
- 14 November
  - UN Secretary-General António Guterres warns the Tigray conflict in Ethiopia may destabilize the entire Horn of Africa.
  - Diwali, Hindu festival of lights, Mauritius
- 15 November – 25000 refugees flee from Tigray, Ethiopia, to Sudan. The conflict takes on an international character as rockets are fired at the Asmara, Eritrea, airport.
- 16 November – COVID-19 pandemic: The United Nations World Food Programme (WFP) warns of famines in the developing world in 2021 as economic funds dry up.
- 20 November – The death toll from protests following 18 November arrest of Robert Kyagulanyi Ssentamu ("Bobi Wine") grows to 37. Ssentamu is a pop singer and candidate for president in the 2021 Ugandan general election.
- 25 November – The Organization of African Unity sends ex-presidents Joaquim Chissano (Mozambique), Ellen Johnson Sirleaf (Liberia), and Kgalema Motlanthe (South Africa) to Addis Ababa to negotiate peace in Ethiopia.
- 26 November – U.S. President Trump contemplates withdrawal for Somalia.

=== December ===
- 8 December – United States intelligence indicates that Eritrea has joined Ethiopia in its war against the Tigray People's Liberation Front (TPLF).
- 11 December
  - Portuguese Defence Minister João Gomes Cravinho says his country will work with Mozambique security forces to fight insurgency starting January 2021 in Mozambique.
  - Pibor County, South Sudan, is likely in a famine, and five other counties are similarly threatened, according to international food security experts.
- 12 December – Jamhuri Day, Independence Day, Kenya
- 15 December
  - Somalia cuts diplomatic ties with Kenya after Muse Bihi Abdi from Somaliland visits Kenya.
  - Sudan says that "Ethiopian forces and militias" ambushed Sudanese army forces near Jabal Abutiour, Sudan. Sudanese Prime Minister Abdalla Hamdok visited Ethiopia briefly on 13 December to discuss the security situation.
- 16 December – The UN warns of a new wave of locusts that threatens food security in the Horn of Africa and Yemen.
- 21 December – Tigray conflict: The African Union says the military action of the Ethiopian government in Tigray was "legitimate".
- 22 December – Unity Day, Zimbabwe
- 24 December – Thirty people die when a boat capsizes in Lake Albert en route from Uganda to Congo.
- 25 December
  - Christmas Day, Western Christian holiday
  - Family Day, Mozambique
  - 2020 Tanzanian general election
- 28 December – Boxing Day, Commonwealth
- 31 December – New Year's Eve

== Culture ==
=== Sports ===
- 29 November 2019 – 11 February 2020: 2019–20 CAF Champions League group stage
- 1 December 2019 – 22 February 2020: 2019–20 CAF Confederation Cup group stage
- January – May: Finals of 2020 African U-17 Women's World Cup Qualifying Tournament
- 21 June: Finals of 2020 African U-20 Women's World Cup Qualifying Tournament
- 7 – 12 July: 2020 World Athletics U20 Championships in Nairobi, Kenya
- 3 – 13 August: 2020 Uganda Cricket World Cup Challenge League B
- 5 – 12 October: 2022 FIFA World Cup qualification – CAF second round

== Deaths ==
=== January ===
- 4 January – Oliver Batali Albino, 84, South Sudanese politician; heart failure
- 5 January – Charles Oguk, 55, Kenyan Olympic hockey player
- 13 January – Andrew Kashita, 87, Zambian politician, MP (1974–1975, 1991–1996), Minister of Mines and Industry (1973–1975) and Transport and Communications (1991–1994)
- 27 January – Lovemore Matombo, 75, Zimbabwean trade unionist, president of ZCTU (2002–2008)
- 28 January – Naomi Karungi, 41, Ugandan military officer; helicopter crash

=== February ===
- 4 February – Daniel arap Moi, 95, former president of Kenya (1978–2002); undisclosed illness (b. 2 September 1924)
- 5 February – Abadi Hadis, 22, Ethiopian Olympic long-distance runner (2016 Summer Olympics).
- 11 February – Marcelino dos Santos, 90, Mozambican poet and politician, Vice President of FRELIMO (1970–1977) and President of the Assembly of the Republic (1977–1994).
- 12 February
  - Michael Berridge, 81, Zimbabwean-born British biochemist.
  - Benon Biraaro, 61, Ugandan military officer, colon cancer.
- 13 February – Iddi Simba, former Minister of for Industry and Trade in Tanzania
- 15 February
  - Simon Kagugube, 65, Ugandan lawyer and corporate executive, heart failure.
  - John Wesley Zvamunondiita Kurewa, 87, Zimbabwean academic, co-founder of Africa University.
  - Prince Kudakwashe Musarurwa, 31, Zimbabwean singer-songwriter, lung cancer.
- 16 February – Nikita Pearl Waligwa, 15, Ugandan actress (Queen of Katwe); brain tumor.
- 17 February
  - Mário da Graça Machungo, 79, Mozambican politician, Prime Minister (1986–1994).
  - Kizito Mihigo, 38, Rwandan gospel singer, organist and peace activist, founder of the Kizito Mihigo Peace Foundation.
- 19 February – Daniel Mburu, 24, motorcycle taxi driver shot by police in Nairobi, Kenya after saving a boy's life

=== March ===
- 5 March – Solomon Berewa, 81, Sierra Leonean politician, Vice-President (2002–2007).
- 9 March – Suleiman Dori, 42, Kenyan politician, MP (since 2013), cancer.
- 20 March – Justin Mulenga, 65, Zambian Roman Catholic prelate, Bishop of Mpika (since 2015).
- 23 March – Zororo Makamba, 30, Zimbabwean television journalist, COVID-19.
- 24 March – Mohamed Farah, 59, Somali footballer (national team), COVID-19.
- 25 March – General Gamal al-Din Omar, Sudan Defence Minister; heart attack
- 27 March – Thandika Mkandawire, 79, Malawian-Swedish economist.
- 31 March
  - Raphael S. Ndingi Mwana a'Nzeki, 88, Kenyan Roman Catholic prelate, Archbishop of Nairobi (1997–2007) (b. 25 December 1931).
  - Gita Ramjee, 63, Ugandan-South African HIV prevention researcher; COVID-19.

=== April ===
- 1 April – Nur Hassan Hussein, 83, Somali politician, Prime Minister (2007–2009), COVID-19.
- 5 April – DJ Miller, 29, Rwandan DJ and musician, stroke.
- 7 April – Xudeydi, 91, Somali oud player, COVID-19.
- 8 April – Jackie du Preez, 77, Zimbabwean cricketer (Rhodesia, South Africa).
- 12 April
  - Khalif Mumin Tohow, justice minister of Somalia's autonomous Hirshabelle State; COVID-19
  - Josephat Torner, 42, Tanzanian albino activist, traffic collision.
- 17 April – Ken Walibora, 56, Kenyan author and journalist (Siku Njema); traffic collision
- 29 April – Richard Ndassa, 61, Tanzanian politician, MP (since 1995)
- 30 April – Manuel Vieira Pinto, 96, Portuguese-born Mozambican Roman Catholic prelate, Bishop and Archbishop of Nampula (1967–2000)

=== May ===
- 1 May – Augustine Mahiga, 74, Tanzanian diplomat and politician, Minister of Foreign Affairs (2015–2019) and Permanent Representative to the UN (2003–2010)
- 4 May – Chege Mbitiru, 77, Kenyan journalist (The Sunday Nation); cardiac arrest
- 8 May – Therence Sinunguruza, 60, Burundian politician, MP (2005–2010), Permanent Representative to the UN (1993–1994) and Vice-President (2010–2013)
- 17 May – Ahmed Muse Nur, Somali politician, governor of Mudug (since 2019); bombing
- 19 May – Peter Kiilu, Kenyan politician, MP (2007–2013)
- 25 May – Jimmy Kirunda, 70, Ugandan football player (Express, KCC, national team) and manager; heart attack.

=== June ===
- 3 June – John Luk Jok, 68, South Sudanese politician, Minister of Justice (2011–2013).
- 8 June – Pierre Nkurunziza, 55, president of Burundi (2005–2020); heart attack
- 13 June – Abenny Jachiga, Kenyan pop star
- 14 June – Kerbino Wol, 37–38, South Sudanese businessman and founder of the 7 October Movement; killed during military attack.
- 16 June – Omondi Long'lilo, 37, Kenyan Benga musician; cancer.
- 18 June – John Bredenkamp, 79, Zimbabwean rugby union player and businessman.
- 28 June – Hachalu Hundessa, 34, Ethiopian singer; shot

=== July ===
- 1 July – Emmanuel Rakotovahiny, 81, Malagasy politician, Prime Minister of Madagascar (1995–1996); heart disease.
- 5 July – Tiloun, 53, Réunionese singer.
- 12 July – Hassan Abshir Farah, 75, Somali politician, Prime Minister (2001–2003) and MP (since 2012).
- 16 July – Cornelius Mwalwanda, Malawian economist and politician; COVID-19.
- 18 July – Charles Bukeko, 58, Kenyan actor and comedian (The Captain of Nakara); COVID-19.
- 24 July
  - Benjamin Mkapa, 81, Tanzanian politician, President (1995–2005).
  - Ben Jipcho, 77, Kenyan athlete, Olympic silver medallist (1972).
- 28 July – Masango Matambanadzo, 56, Zimbabwean politician, MP (since 2013).
- 29 July – Perrance Shiri, 65, Zimbabwean military officer and politician, Minister of Agriculture (since 2017) and Commander of the Air Force (1992–2017); COVID-19.

=== August ===
- 5 August – Hawa Abdi, 73, Somali human rights activist.
- 7 August – Ramadhan Seif Kajembe, 66, Kenyan politician, MP (2007–2013).
- 29 August – David Mungoshi, 71, Zimbabwean writer.

=== September ===
- 1 September – Erick Morillo, Colombian-American disc jockey, record label owner, and music producer (I Like to Move It, a song employed by the Madagascar franchise in the movie of the same name).
- 13 September – Said Ali Kemal, 81–82, Comorian politician, Member of the Assembly of the Union of the Comoros (2004–2010).

=== October ===
- 8 October – Ali Khalif Galaydh, 78, Somali politician, Prime Minister (2000–2001), MP (since 2012) and President of Khatumo State (since 2014).

=== November ===
- 18 November – Umar Ghalib, 90, Somali politician, Prime Minister (1991–1993) and Minister of Foreign Affairs (1969–1976).

=== December ===
- 4 December – James Odongo, 89, Ugandan Roman Catholic prelate, Archbishop of Roman Catholic Archdiocese of Tororo (1999–2007).
- 12 December – Fikre Selassie Wogderess, 75, Ethiopian politician, Prime Minister (1987–1989); complications from diabetes.
- 19 December – Kirunda Kivejinja, 85, Ugandan Minister of East African Community Affairs (since 2016), COVID-19.

== See also ==
- 2020–21 South-West Indian Ocean cyclone season
- 2020 in Middle Africa
- 2020 in North Africa
- 2020 in Southern Africa
- 2020 in West Africa
- 2020 in politics and government
- 2019–20 locust infestation
- COVID-19 pandemic in Africa
- 2020s
- 2020s in political history
- List of sovereign states and dependent territories in Africa
- Grand Ethiopian Renaissance Dam
- African Union
- United Nations geoscheme
- Common Market for Eastern and Southern Africa
- International Organisation of La Francophonie (OIF)
- East African Community
- Southern African Development Community
- Community of Sahel–Saharan States
- List of George Floyd protests outside the United States
