= 7 October (disambiguation) =

7 October may refer to:

- October 7, a date on the Gregorian calendar
- October 7 attacks, occurring in Israel on 7 October 2023
- 7 October Movement, a South Sudanese opposition group
- Constitution of Libya (1951), signed 7 October 1951
  - 7 October Stadium, a Libyan stadium formerly known as the Municipal Stadium in Tripoli
  - Seventh October University, a Libyan university later merged with the University of Al-Merqib into Misurata University

== See also ==
- 10/7
- 7/10
