= Hoji-ya-Henda =

Angolan guerilla fighter (1941–1968)

- Birth name: José Mendes de Carvalho
- Born: c. 1941; Angola
- Died: 14 April 1968 (aged 27); Karipande, Moxico, Angola
- Allegiance: People's Armed Forces for the Liberation of Angola
- Battles / wars: Portuguese Colonial War

José Mendes de Carvalho (c. 1941 – April 14, 1968), known by his nom de guerre Hoji-ya-Henda, was a guerrilla fighter of the People's Armed Forces for the Liberation of Angola (FAPLA). Now remembered as a folk hero in Angola, he was killed during the Portuguese Colonial War.

Mendes died in combat, at 27 years old, during a raid on the headquarters of the Portuguese colonial army in Karipande, Moxico, Angola, on April 14, 1968. He was buried near the river Lundoji 50 kilometres (30 mi) from the then headquarters of Karipande, from the Front East of the Third Political-Military Region. In August 1968, the People's Liberation Movement of Angola (MPLA) assigned Hoji-ya-Henda the title of "dear son of the Angolan people and heroic fighter of the MPLA".

The First Assembly of the Third Political-Military Region of the MPLA, held on March 23, 1969, determined that April 14 would be celebrated in Angola as Angolan Youth Day in his memory. The decision was later confirmed by an assembly of youth organisations, some of them affiliated to the National Youth Council (CNJ) that gathered in Cabinda for a number of years.
