= Youth Day =

Holiday

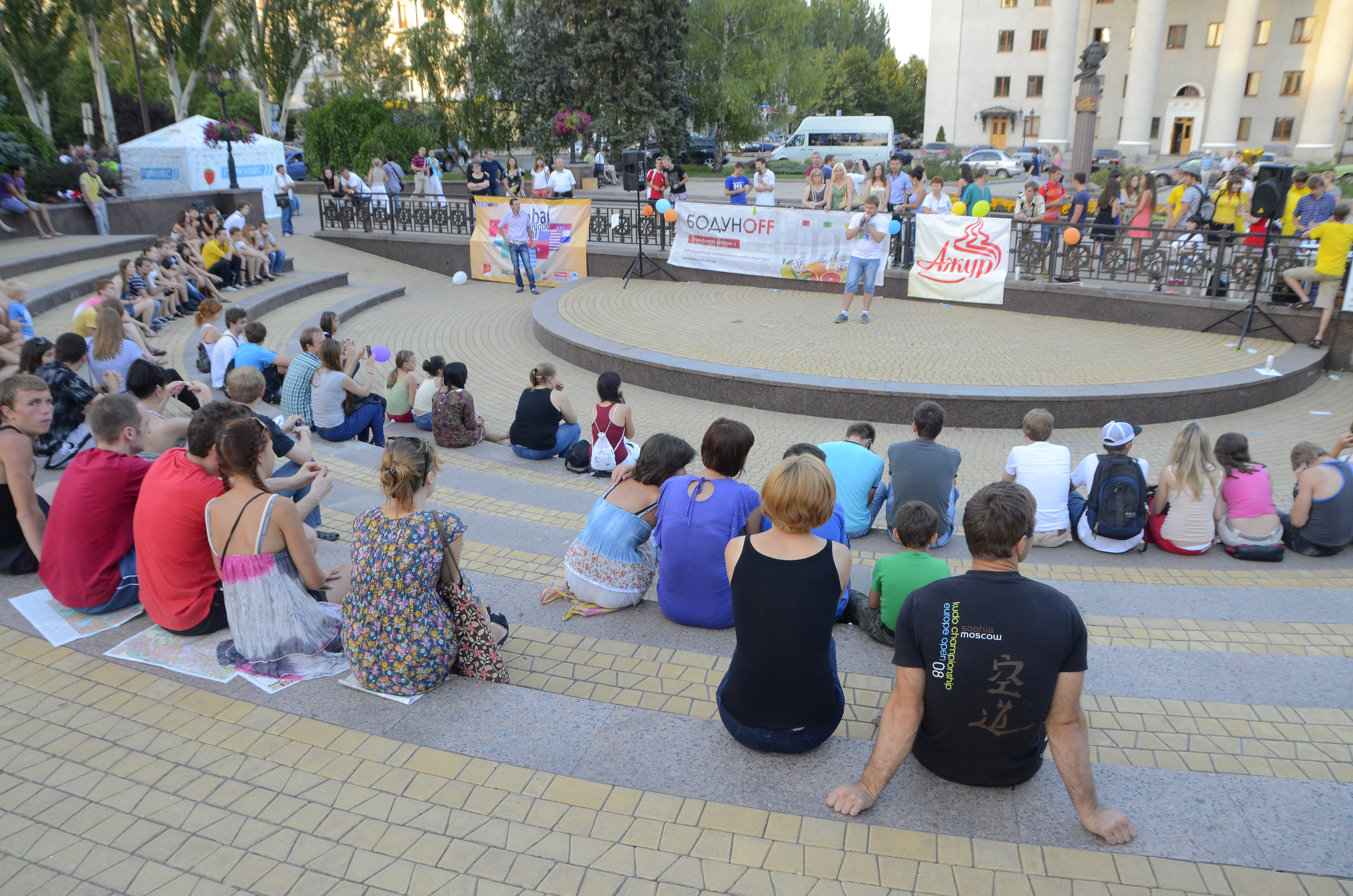
National Youth Day in Donetsk, Ukraine

Youth Day or National Youth Day is a commemorative holiday in honour of young people, celebrated in different parts of the world on various dates throughout the year.

Many countries' observance of the day corresponds with International Youth Day on August 12, which has been officially recognized by the United Nations since 1999. There is also a World Youth Day, an event organized by the Catholic Church that takes place on the Sunday before Advent, and was initiated by Pope John Paul II in 1985.

== Dates by country/culture ==
Country/Culture	Date	Info	Refs
Albania	December 8	In Albania, National Youth Day (Albanian: Dita Kombëtare e Rinisë) was ratified by Albanian Parliament (2010) as an official and national holiday.	
Angola	April 14	Angola observes Youth Day on April 14 in memory of Hoji-ya-Henda, who was killed on that day during the Portuguese Colonial War.	
Azerbaijan	February 2	In Azerbaijan, the observance is called the Day of Youth.	
Bahamas	October (month)	Rather than a singular day, The Bahamas celebrates National Youth Month.	
Brazil	March 21		
Brunei Darussalam	August 1	National Youth Day is held on August 1 every year where the youth of the country come together with a meaningful purpose. Proclamation of Youth Day by His Majesty Sultan Haji Hassanal Bolkiah Mu'izzaddin Waddaulah ibni Al-Marhum Sultan Haji Omar 'Ali Saifuddien Sa'adul Khairi Waddien, Sultan and Yang Di-Pertuan of Brunei Darussalam for August 1 National Youth Day is a recognition and appreciation of the youth movement in this country.	
Cameroon	February 11	National Youth Day in Cameroon has been celebrated on February 11 since 1966.	
Cape Verde	June 1		
China	May 4	Youth Day (Chinese: 青年节) in China was established in December 1949 by the Government Administration Council to commemorate the patriotic May Fourth Movement in 1919, in which many young intellectuals protested against imperialists.	
India	January 12	National Youth Day in India is celebrated on January 12 on the birthday of Swami Vivekananda.	
Iran	Varies	Youth Day is celebrated in Iran on 11th Shaban (Hijri Ghamari) on the birthday of Hazrat e Alie Akbar (first son of Imam Hossein). After the Iranian Revolution in 1979, the Islamic government endeavored to replace most of the national days with religious events.	
Kiribati	First Friday of August	Youth Day is celebrated on the first Friday of August in Kiribati.	
Malaysia	May 15	The first celebration of Youth's Day was in 1971 as for the government's efforts to recognise the youth's contribution of the country	
Morocco	August 21	Youth Day (Arabic: عيد الشباب) is a public holiday in Morocco on August 21, the birthday of the reigning monarch, Mohammed VI.	
Nigeria	November 1	President Muhammadu Buhari established National Youth Day in 2020 to find solutions to the issues that affect young people. It is held on November 1.	
North Korea	August 28	Youth Day in North Korea is observed annually on August 28 to honor Kim Il Sung's founding of the Korean Communist Youth League on August 8, 1927.	
Pakistan	March 11		
Palau	March 15	Youth Day is a work-free public holiday in Palau, and is one of the most important holiday celebrations in the island nation. It was created in order to help integrate the youth in public service early on "in order to help them become better decision-makers in the future and to create a reservoir of highly-intellectual pool of educated men in the country."	
Paraguay	September 21	Youth and Spring Day (Día de la Primavera y la Juventud) is celebrated on September 21 in Paraguay, which marks the start of the spring season.	
Philippines	August 12	Educational institutions are mandated to launch related activities provided that these will be undertaken at the discretion of the school administration.	
Singapore	First Sunday of July	In Singapore, Youth Day is celebrated on first Sunday of July every year, where the following day will normally be a scheduled school holiday. (Original date: 4 July)	
South Africa	June 16	Youth Day on June 16 is a public holiday in South Africa and commemorates a protest which resulted in a wave of protests across the country known as the Soweto uprising of 1976.	
Taiwan	March 29	In Taiwan, Youth Day (青年節) is celebrated on March 29 in commemoration of the Huanghuagang Uprising of 1911. (Not to be confused with Taiwan Youth Day.)	
Thailand	September 20	National Youth Day (Thai: วันเยาวชนแห่งชาติ, Wan Yaowachon Haeng Chat) in Thailand, on September 20, commemorates the birth dates of Kings Chulalongkorn and Ananda Mahidol. Thailand celebrates Youth Day on this date because of the many births in the month of September.	
Turkey	May 19	Commemoration of Atatürk, Youth and Sports Day (Turkish: Atatürk'ü Anma, Gençlik ve Spor Bayramı) on May 19 commemorates the youth, as well as Kemal Atatürk, the "Father of Turkey".	
Tunisia	December 17	Youth Day is celebrated December 17 in Tunisia just after celebration of their independence.	
Ukraine	August 12	Before 2022, Youth Day in Ukraine was celebrated on the last Sunday of June. The date was moved to August 12, the day of International Youth Day, in 2021 "in order to support the desire of Ukrainian youth to integrate into the European community, affirm the values of democracy and freedom, as well as taking into account the initiative of youth organizations and movements."	
Venezuela	February 12	Youth Day in Venezuela was created to commemorate all the teenagers above 12 years old who fought and died in the Battle of La Victoria (1814), during the Venezuelan War of Independence, on February 12, 1814.	
Vietnam	March 26		
Yugoslavia (former)	May 25	Youth Day was celebrated throughout the former Yugoslavia on May 25, as well as being a celebration of Josip Broz Tito's birthday. After the breakup of Yugoslavia, Youth Day continues to be celebrated in Tito's birthplace of Kumrovec, gathering several thousand visitors annually.	
Zambia	March 12	Youth Day in Zambia recalls the day in 1962 when young people were killed during the independence movement. The day celebrates young people and their contribution to development. It recognizes that the young people are the future leaders and must be treated as such.	
Zimbabwe	February 21	Robert Gabriel Mugabe National Youth Day is February 21.	
United Nations	August 12	International Youth Day	
Catholics	November 20–26, floating Sunday	World Youth Day	

== India ==
Youth Day in India is celebrated on January 12 on the birthday of Swami Vivekananda.

In 1984, the Government of India declared and decided to observe the Birthday of Swami Vivekananda (12 January, according to the English calendar) as National Youth Day every year from 1985 onwards. To quote from the Government of India's Communication, ‘It was felt that the philosophy of Swamiji and the ideals for which he lived and worked could be a great source of inspiration for the Indian Youth.’

Swami Vivekananda's Birthday, according to Indian Almanac (Vishuddha Siddhanta Almanac) is on Pausha Krishna Saptami tithi, which falls on different English Calendar dates every year. This is observed in various centres of Ramakrishna Math and Mission in a traditional Hindu manner which includes mangalarati, special worship, homa (fire-ritual), meditation, devotional songs, religious discourses, sandhyarati (versper service in the evenings), and so on.

The National Youth Day is observed all over India at schools and colleges with processions, speeches, recitations, music, youth conventions, seminars, Yogasana presentation, competitions in essay-writing, recitations, speeches, music, sports, and other programs on 12 January every year dunce.

== Philippines ==
Philippine president Elpidio Quirino first issued in 1948 a proclamation designating June 19 as Filipino Youth Day, coinciding with the birth anniversary of hero Jose Rizal, whose works had inspired the Filipino youths to serve the country. Educational and religious institutions, as well as civic organizations and local communities, are encouraged to join in that observance which is being commemorated until now.

August 12 annually was later declared as the National Youth Day in dating with the United Nations' international commemoration, by virtue of Republic Act No. 11913, one of the three bills for the youth which lapsed into law in July 2022. Educational institutions are mandated to launch related activities provided that these will be undertaken at the discretion of the school administration.

Meanwhile, the Catholic Bishops' Conference of the Philippines began its own National Youth Day in 1986 with the declaration of December 16 as such, to implement its preferential apostolate for children and youth. Since 1987, celebrations are being held with gatherings in various dioceses and parishes, annually until 1998 when it has been held every 2–3 years. The one which would be held in 2021 was postponed due to COVID-19 pandemic, delayed until 2025.

== South Africa ==
Youth Day on 16 June is a public holiday in South Africa and commemorates a protest which resulted in a wave of protests across the country known as the Soweto uprising of 1976. It came in response to multiple issues with the Bantu Education Act and the government edict in 1974 that Afrikaans will be used as medium of instruction for certain subjects in black schools. The iconic picture of Hector Pieterson whose sister now works at a museum which honours Hector Peterson and his family claim that the apartheid regime spelled his name wrong, a black schoolchild shot by the police, brought home to many people within and outside of South Africa the effect of the struggle during the Apartheid government's reign. It is celebrated as a public holiday across South Africa to remember the brave students who protest against Afrikaans as the only medium of language for education.

== Taiwan ==
Youth Day (青年節) in Taiwan (officially the Republic of China) has been celebrated on March 29 since 1954. It commemorates the Huanghuagang Uprising of 1911, during which 72 young revolutionaries sacrificed their lives to overthrow the Qing Dynasty. The Uprising took place on April 27 (the 29th day of the 3rd month in Chinese Calendar), 1911 and is subsequently known as 3.29 Guangzhou Uprising. This event also marked the last unsuccessful attempt to overthrow the Qing before the Wuchang Uprising overturned millennia of dynastic rule in China to establish the Republic of China.

== Turkey ==
In Turkey, the Commemoration of Atatürk, Youth and Sports Day (Turkish: Atatürk'ü Anma, Gençlik ve Spor Bayramı) on May 19 is dedicated to the youth, as well as commemorating Kemal Atatürk, the "Father of Turkey", and the beginning of the national liberation movement initiated by Atatürk in 1919

The day is celebrated in honor of the arrival of Atatürk to Samsun on May 19, 1919, when the Turkish War of Independence began.

== Yugoslavia ==
Youth Day was celebrated throughout the former Yugoslavia on May 25. This was also a celebration of Josip Broz Tito's birthday. Even though Tito was born on May 7, 1892, this date was chosen in remembrance of the Operation Rösselsprung in 1944, a Nazi attempt on his life on the date of birth listed on his forged personal documents. In the weeks preceding the festival, youth ran a relay around the country, and on his birthday Tito was ceremonially presented with the baton. The baton, which had passed through all major cities, contained a symbolic birthday message, ostensibly from the youth of the whole country.

After the breakup of Yugoslavia, Youth Day continues to be celebrated in Tito's birthplace of Kumrovec, gathering several thousand visitors annually.

== See also ==
World Youth Day – observed by the Catholic Church
