= Republican Rally for Democracy in Rwanda =

Republican Rally for Democracy in Rwanda Rassemblement Républicain pour la Démocratie au Rwanda
- President: Victoire Ingabire Umuhoza
- Founded: 3 April 1995
- Ideology: Liberal democracy
- National affiliation: United Democratic Forces of Rwanda
- Slogan: "A reconciled people in a rule of law."

The Republican Rally for Democracy in Rwanda (French: Rassemblement Républicain pour la Démocratie au Rwanda (RDR)), also known as the Rassemblement Démocratique pour la Retour (Rally for the Return [of Refugees and Democracy in Rwanda]) is an unregistered Rwandan political party. Its stated goal is to establish a democratic and free Rwandan Republic, and its current president is Victoire Ingabire Umuhoza.

== History ==
The Rally for the Return of Refugee and Democracy in Rwanda was formed on April 3, 1995, by a group of Rwandan refugees in Mugunga, the eastern region of the then Zaire, now the Democratic Republic of the Congo.

The RDR's creation was a response to the outcome of the Rwandan Civil War and the resulting refugee crisis in the African Great Lakes region. By August 1994, over two million Rwandan refugees fled to neighboring African countries and created an extreme humanitarian crisis. Inside Rwanda, the internally displaced population were at risk of famine. Within refugee camps, the presence of former government military personnel and Interahamwe, a Hutu extremist group responsible for the Tutsi genocide, undermined the welfare of civilian refugees, making the humanitarian relief effort vastly complex.

== Criticism ==
In We Wish to Inform You That Tomorrow We Will Be Killed with Our Families, author Philip Gourevitch claimed that the RDR, founded in the refugee camps of exiled Hutus in Zaire after the 1994 Rwandan genocide, is a shadow organization effectively run by former Rwandan Armed Forces (FAR) commanders and genocidaires. He criticized Western aid workers, who regarded the RDR as a moderate and legitimate organization, as naive and ill-informed. René Lemarchand criticized the book for its lack of scholarly credentials.
