= 107 =

107 may refer to:

- 107 (number), the natural number following 106 and preceding 108
- AD 107, a year in the 2nd century AD
- 107 BC, a year in the 2nd century BC
- 107 (New Jersey bus)
- 107 Camilla, a main-belt asteroid
- Peugeot 107, a city car
- 107 Days, a book by Kamala Harris
- "107", a song by Less Than Jake on their 1996 album Losing Streak
- "107", a song by electronic rock band Orgy on their 2000 album Vapor Transmission

== See also ==
- 10/7 (disambiguation)
- Bohrium, chemical element with atomic number 107
