= 10/7 =

10/7 may refer to:

== Dates ==
- October 7 (month-day date notation)
- July 10 (day-month date notation)
- July of AD 10 (month-year date notation)
- October of AD 7 (year-month date notation)

== Events ==
- October 7 attacks, a Hamas-led attack that started the Gaza War

== Values ==
- 10 shillings and 7 pence, in UK predecimal currency
- 10/7, a fraction, = 10/7 = 1 3/7 = 1.4̅2̅8̅5̅7̅1̅...; a repeating decimal

== See also ==
- 107 (disambiguation)
- 7/10 (disambiguation)
- 7 October (disambiguation)
