= United Democratic Forces of Rwanda =

United Democratic Forces of Rwanda Forces Democratiques Unifiées
- President: Placide Kayumba
- Chairperson: Placide Kayumba -Since 4 of September 2021
- Spokesperson: Victoire Ingabire Umuhoza
- Founder: Victoire Ingabire Umuhoza
- Founded: 29 April 2006
- Merger of: Democratic Resistance Forces; RDR; Democratic Alliance of Rwanda
- Preceded by: RDR
- Ideology: Grassroots democracy Egalitarianism; Green Politics; Anti-Racism; Anti-Fascism; Anti-Authoritarianism; Anti-Kagame; Decentralization
- Political position: Center to Center-left
- Religion: Secular
- Colors: Red, green
- Slogan: For the Rule of Law, Democracy and Equal Opportunity

Website
- fdu-rwanda.com

The United Democratic Forces of Rwanda (UDF-Inkingi; Inkingi is the Kinyarwanda word for “pillar. French: Forces Democratiques Unifiées, FDU-INKINGI) is a coalition of Rwandan opposition groups. Since its foundation in 2006, the UDF-Inkingi has profiled itself as an opposition party whose main objective is to change the regime of the Rwandan Patriotic Front (RPF), which has been in power since the end of the genocide against the Tutsis in July 1994. To this day, despite multiple attempts to become officially registered in Rwanda, the UDF-Inkingi has not yet been authorised to operate in Rwanda as a party. According to international human rights bodies, such as Human Rights Watch and Amnesty International, UDF-Inkingi members inside Rwanda have been regularly subjected to persecution and even to murder, mostly non-elucidated.

== History ==
The party was established on 29 April 2006 as an alliance of the Republican Rally for Democracy in Rwanda (RDR), Action for Impartial International Justice in Rwanda, the Democratic Forces for Resistance and the Rwandan Democratic Alliance, with RDR leader Victoire Ingabire Umuhoza elected President of the UDF.

Having been formed in exile, the alliance's leadership returned to Rwanda in January 2010 and applied to be registered in order to field candidates in the presidential elections later in the year. However, the alliance was prevented from registering and Ingabire was arrested.

The departure of Victoire Ingabire Umuhoza to Rwanda and her management of party activities from there provoked a split in 2010 amongst UDF-Inkingi members who remained in exile in Europe. The majority faction, which pledged allegiance to Victoire Ingabire Umuhoza’s leadership, even from behind bars, kept the name UDF-Inkingi, whereas the minority faction, which advocated a new Europe-based leadership, took the name of UDF-National Movement Inkubiri.

In 2011, as the RPF witnessed defections amongst its most senior military officers and political figures who used to be very close to President Paul Kagame, the UDF-Inkingi formed an alliance with RPF dissidents who had started their own party, namely, the Rwanda National Congress (RNC), spearheaded by former army chief-of-staff Kayumba Nyamwasa and presidential cabinet director, doctor Theogene Rudasingwa. Later the alliance expanded to include five parties in total.

== Victoire Ingabire Umuhoza ==
Mrs Victoire Ingabire Umuhoza was UDF-Inkingi chairwoman since its foundation in 2006 until 2019 when, just a few months after her release from jail following a presidential pardon, she started a new party, the Development and Liberty for All (DALFA-Umurinzi). For 13 years, she was the face and voice of the UDF-Inkingi, including during the eight years (2010–2018) that she spent in jail. Her trial drew a lot of international media attention and encountered multiple bombshells, including the time when some of the prosecutor’s witnesses contradicted themselves in court or denounced police ill-treatment that was meant to extort false testimony, and when Dutch authorities authorised the search of Victoire Ingabire Umuhoza’s home in order to obtain evidence for the Rwandan court.

After Victoire Ingabire Umuhoza’s resignation from the UDF-Inkingi in November 2019, the party elected Justin Bahunga, a former diplomat, as chairman for a two-year term. During the official launching of her new party, Victoire Ingabire Umuhoza told her party’s members and the press that the difference between the DALFA-Umurinzi and the UDF-Inkingi was that the former, unlike the latter, had been set up following Rwanda’s laws. However, her detractors, who make use of the pro-government press, maintain that the two organisations have the same ideals and ideology, and that creating the party brought nothing new except for a new name.

== Persecutions ==
According to several human rights organisations and diplomatic missions to Rwanda, UDF-members are regularly the victims of harassment, arbitrary arrests, never-elucidated disappearances and even murder. Amnesty International cited numerous cases, including that of Illuminée Iragema who has been missing since 2016, and the cases of Jean Damascène Habarugira and Syldio Dusabumuremyi who were murdered in 2017 and 2018 respectively, and that of Boniface Twagirimana, UDF-Inkingi vice-chairman, whose alleged escape from the Mpanga maximum-security prison prompts many to think that it was in fact a well-planned abduction by secret services.
