= Kizito Mihigo =

Rwandan gospel musician and activist (1981–2020)

- Born: Kizito Mihigo; 25 July 1981; Kibeho, Rwanda
- Died: 17 February 2020 (aged 38) Kigali, Rwanda
- Genres: Gospel, sacred music
- Occupations: Singer, organist, composer, songwriter
- Instruments: Organ, keyboard
- Years active: 1994–2020
- Website: kizitomihigo.com

Kizito Mihigo (25 July 1981 – 17 February 2020) was a Rwandan gospel singer, songwriter, organist, composer of sacred music, television presenter, genocide survivor, peace maker and peace and reconciliation activist. Kizito was an iconic activist who dedicated his life to healing the souls of his fellow genocide survivors and rebuilding unity and reconciliation in Rwanda. According to Kisito's words, published on Kizitomihigo.com, he claimed, "The objective of my works is to console and strengthen the wounded hearts, singing peace and forgiveness." His ultimate performance in healing and Peacebuilding started in 2010 when he created the Kizito Mihigo Peace Foundation, a non-profit organization devoted to his cause.

In April 2014, after releasing a critical song challenging the official narrative of the Rwandan genocide, Mihigo was arrested and charged with planning to oust the government. In February 2015, he was sentenced to 10 years of imprisonment after being convicted of conspiracy against the government of President Paul Kagame. Although having been released from Mageragere Prison by presidential grace in September 2018, Mihigo was rearrested on 13 February 2020 and died in custody on 17 February, under suspicious circumstances.

== Early life and education ==
Kizito Mihigo was born on 25 July 1981 in Kibeho, Nyaruguru district, in the former Gikongoro Province (now Southern Province) of Rwanda. He was the third of six children born to Augustin Buguzi and Placidie Ilibagiza. At the age of 9, he began composing songs. Five years later, when he was studying in secondary school at the Petit Seminaire de Butare, he became the most popular liturgical organist and composer of the Catholic Church in Rwanda.

In 1994, Mihigo was orphaned in the Rwandan genocide. He escaped to Burundi where he met surviving members of his family, and tried unsuccessfully to join the Rwandan Patriotic Army (RPA) to avenge his family. In July 1994, Mihigo returned to Rwanda. After high school, he enrolled at the seminary to become a priest, and through music and the Christian faith, he managed to forgive those who killed his father.

== Musician ==
In 2001, he participated in the competition for the composition of the Rwandan national anthem and was later granted a presidential scholarship to study at the Conservatoire de Paris (with the financial support of Rwandan President Paul Kagame). In Paris, Mihigo undertook organ and composition courses under the supervision of Françoise Levechin-Gangloff. He then began his international music career in Belgium.

In 2011, Kizito Mihigo settled permanently in Rwanda and became a respected artistic personality. He was regularly invited to sing at national ceremonies for the genocide commemoration. He also became known through many invitations in official ceremonies in parliament or elsewhere to interpret the national anthem in the presence of the head of state and other senior dignitaries.

Mihigo's close relationship with the government raised the Christian scrutiny, who were disappointed by their liturgical composer's possible deviation towards politically oriented themes. However, in 2011, the singer tried to reassure his fans. His religious concerts attracted a large number of people in Kigali and Kibeho, Mihigo's birthplace. Such events were often celebrated in the presence of different ministers. In 2011, Mihigo's most popular concerts were those for Easter and Christmas.

=== Works ===
Since the 1994 genocide, the Rwandan singer had composed more than 400 songs in 20 years.

The most popular are:

- "Arc en ciel"
- "Twanze gutoberwa amateka"
- "Inuma"
- "Iteme"
- "Urugamba rwo kwibohora"
- "Mon frère congolais"
- "Mwungeri w'intama"
- "Yohani yarabyanditse"
- "Turi abana b'u Rwanda"
- "Igisobanuro cy'urupfu" (English: The meaning of death)
- "Umujinya mwiza"

== Activism for peace and reconciliation ==
During his stay in Europe, Mihigo met the Mouvement international de la Réconciliation (MIR), a French non-governmental organization (NGO) that advocates for non-violence. In 2007, in collaboration with the organization, Kizito Mihigo organized a Mass for Peace in Africa, held in Brussels.

For the African Catholic community living in Europe, he had regularly organized concerts of sacred music followed by a Requiem Mass for victims of violence across the world. These masses were celebrated by André-Joseph Léonard, the bishop of Namur who later became the archbishop of Brussels.

In 2010, the Mihigo created the Kizito Mihigo Peace Foundation (KMP), an NGO advocating for peace and reconciliation. He settled in Rwanda the following year and, in partnership with the Rwandan government, World Vision International and the United States Embassy in Kigali, he began a tour of schools and prisons in Rwanda. In schools, Mihigo's goal was to promote youth education regarding peace and reconciliation, as well as the establishment of peace clubs. In prisons, the singer's aim was to generate debates with inmates about their crimes before creating dialog clubs called "conflict transformation clubs".

Upon his release from prison, Kizito founded a Music Academy. During school holidays, singer Kizito Mihigo organized music training for primary and secondary students in Kigali, the capital city of Rwanda. The activity was a part of a broader project looking for funding to create the first School of Music in Rwanda, focusing on sacred music. In 2019, thirty-six pupils, with 14 students from High School and 22 students from Primary School, graduated from the program, obtaining a certificate of music training.

=== Awards ===
In August 2011, in recognition of his activities for peace, Mihigo received a CYRWA award (Celebrating Young Rwandan Achievers) given by the Imbuto foundation, an organization of the First Lady of Rwanda, Jeannette Kagame.

In April 2013, the Rwanda Governance Board recognized the Kizito Mihigo Peace Foundation among the top-ten local NGOs that had promoted good governance in Rwanda. Because of this, the Foundation received the "RGB award" of 8,000,000 Rwandan francs.

== Television presenter ==
From 2012 until his death, Kizito Mihigo had presented Umusanzu w'Umuhanzi (English: The artist’s contribution), a weekly national television program produced by the KMP Foundation. In the one-hour program, the singer discusses his concerts with prisoners and students. Once a month during the program, Mihigo organizes an interfaith dialogue, which takes the form of a debate with religious leaders to understand the role of religion in peacebuilding.

== Private life ==
As a Catholic, Mihigo was an admirer of Mozart, Bach, and Haendel, as well as a fan of martial arts and cinema. Though Mihigo had long been single with no children, a 2012 rumor in the local media spoke of a secret love affair between him and Miss Jojo, a local R&B singer. When interviewed, both parties denied the relationship and spoke instead of a deep friendship.

Since 2009, Mihigo has appeared often in the Media of Rwanda as one of the celebrities who attracts the most women in Rwanda. In April 2013, The New Times ranked him as the second-hottest male celebrity in Rwanda.

== Critical song ==
In March 2014, Mihigo uploaded a new song called "Igisobanuro Cy’urupfu" (English: "The Meaning of Death") on YouTube. The song challenged the official narrative of the Rwandan genocide. It was immediately prohibited by the Rwandan government and quickly deleted from the website.

The song contained the lyrics:

...Though the genocide orphaned me, let it not make me lose empathy for others. Their lives too were brutally taken but not qualified as genocide. Those brothers and sisters they too are human beings. I pray for them. I comfort them. I remember them ... Death is never good, be it by the genocide, or war or slaughtered in revenge killings...

The Christian singer was referring to alleged crimes committed by the Rwandan Patriotic Front (RPF) ruling party. In the same song, the singer criticized a program called "Ndi umunyarwanda" (English: I am Rwandan). In this controversial program launched by President Kagame in 2013, the whole Hutu population is urged to apologize for having participated in the Rwandan genocide.

My dignity and love are not rooted in carnal life nor in material possessions, but in humanity. Let the words I am Rwandan be preceded by I am human

said the Rwandan genocide survivor in the 4th verse of his song "Igisobanuro cy'urupfu".

== Arrest ==
On 7 April 2014, the day of the 20th commemoration of the genocide, the singer was reported missing. On 12 April, former Prime Minister Faustin Twagiramungu claimed that Mihigo was in police custody over the controversial song. On 15 April, Mihigo was presented to journalists by the Rwanda National Police, arrested on suspicion of plotting terrorist attacks and collaborating with the Democratic Forces for the Liberation of Rwanda (FDLR) and the Rwanda National Congress (RNC) political parties to oust the government. WikiLeaks later revealed that the singer was kidnapped on 4 April, 10 days before the official announcement of his arrest.

Many observers were convinced that Mihigo's arrest was linked to the prohibited song that had been released a few days earlier. This was posthumously confirmed by Mihigo himself. A few weeks before the announcement of his arrest, during a speech for the graduation ceremony for police officers at Gishari, Paul Kagame declared, "I am not a singer to entertain haters of Rwanda". After the official announcement of the arrest, the Rwandan government banned the broadcast of Mihigo's songs on local radio and television.

Following a hearing on 21 April, a confession interview was broadcast. According to Radio France Internationale (RFI), in this interview Mihigo "pleaded guilty to all charges and requested to be assisted by a lawyer". RFI reported that in a second confession interview, he declared that he had "accepted the idea of reading a statement denouncing the lack of the rule of law in Rwanda and calling the youth to rise".

=== Reactions ===
A human rights defender interviewed by RFI stated that, "Those kinds of confessions are contrary to the principle of presumption of innocence". Other Rwandan human rights activists spoke of "an action to oppress Reconciliation acts". Rwandan official sources rejected accusations of possible torture.

For Monsignor Léonard, the arrest was inconsistent with Mihigo's character. "There is an error on the person, I can never consider Kizito as a man who would be dangerous to society," he said a year later in an interview with Jambo News.

Several international media outlets commented on the event. According to RFI, the arrest of the musician caused confusion in the country and fear of destabilization. The widely-broadcast confessions and speeches by politicians before the trial began caused outrage among human rights activists, who denounced the violation of the presumption of innocence.

According to Al Jazeera and France Inter, the singer's kidnapping on the eve of the 20th commemoration of the genocide resulted from the lyrics of his song "Igisobanuro cy'urupfu", in which he challenged the Commemoration Policy implemented by the Kigali government led by the Rwandan Patriotic Front.

Belgian journalist Colette Braeckman found it difficult to believe that the singer was working with the FDLR. Interviewed by Le Nouvel Observateur, she considered the singer's arrest a sign of internal unrest. "There is no doubt, something else is going on, which we don't know because everyone is silent as usual in Rwanda", she told Le Soir.

The International Federation for Human Rights (FIDH) denounced the arrest as having a political aftertaste. The organization spoke of "a new proof of the repressive turn of the regime of Rwandan President Paul Kagame". Reporters Without Borders reacted after the arrest of Mihigo and his co-defendants, including journalist Cassian Ntamuhanga. The NGO denounced the illegal detention of the journalist a week before the official announcement of the police, and was concerned about the deteriorating environment for the media in Rwanda.

The United States expressed concern following the arrest of Mihigo. According to RFI, Washington reminded the Rwandan government of the importance of "allowing freedom of expression [...] respecting the freedom of the press and granting defendants the minimum guarantee for a fair trial". The United Kingdom also considered the case of Mihigo and his co-defendants, asking the Rwandan government to ensure a fair trial.

After the reaction of the US and UK, during his visit to Western Province, President Kagame rejected the criticism of arbitrary arrests. He threatened to "continue arrests and even kill in broad daylight those who would attempt to destabilize the country".

The Rwandan opposition in exile, comprising the Rwanda National Congress (RNC) and the FDLR, condemned Mihigo's arrest. An RNC spokesman declared that he was disturbed and disappointed by the president's speech and said Mihigo's arrest was a consequence of his song "Igisobanuro cy'Urupfu".

== Trial ==
After two postponements, the trial began on 6 November 2014 in Kigali. Mihigo pleaded guilty to all charges against him and requested leniency from the panel of judges. His lawyers said that they did not find the elements of an offense. The three co-defendants plead not guilty and claimed torture.

=== Pleadings ===
The prosecution accused Mihigo of having conversations via Internet with an alleged member of the RNC, an opposition party in exile that the government describes as terrorist. In these written conversations, Mihigo suggested a reversal of the government with names of people to be killed, among them President Kagame.

According to the British Broadcasting Corporation (BBC), the prosecutor said that the accused were hoping to avenge Colonel Patrick Karegeya, former head of the Rwandan army intelligence who became a political opponent of Kagame's government. The co-founder of the RNC was found strangled on 1 January 2014 in a luxury hotel in South Africa. The South African government has accused Rwanda of being behind the assassination and attempted assassination of Rwandan exiled opponents in South Africa. The Rwandan authorities denied this, though Kagame stated that "anyone who will betray Rwanda shall assume its consequences".

In his argument, Mihigo acknowledged having had these conversations with a man named Sankara but denied the intention to kill the President and said that his commitment in the discussions was motivated by simple curiosity. "I was in conflict with some of the officials at that time, but I have never had problems with the President," he told RFI. His lawyers continued to argue that none of this constituted a crime.

On the second day of the trial, Mihigo asked to be tried separately, which was denied. On the third day of the trial, Mihigo waived his lawyers and continued to plead guilty. During the trial, prosecutors requested perpetuity against Mihigo.

=== Verdict ===
On 27 February 2015, Mihigo was sentenced to 10 years imprisonment after being convicted of conspiracy against the government of Kagame. However, due to the lack of evidence, he was discharged of "conspiracy to commit terrorism".

=== Reactions to verdict ===
On the day that the verdict was announced, France 24, RFI and Reuters reconsidered the song which caused the wrath of the regime and the fall of Mihigo. Some observers interviewed by Agence France-Presse talked of a "feverish power that does not tolerate dissenting voices".

Susan Thomson, Professor at Colgate University, believed that the trial showed the government on the defensive: "I interpret it as a weakness sign [...] since they have to eliminate people with a potential base in the country". She also stated that "the Government is using the trial of Kizito Mihigo as an alert message to all those who would want to be politically active".

For Huffington Post observers, Mihigo was forced to plead guilty without a lawyer and to hope for a release, which unfortunately had no effect on his sentence.

International NGOs for the defence of human rights, such as Amnesty International and Human Rights Watch, criticized the conduct of the criminal proceedings in their reports for the year 2014–15, denouncing the illegal detention, torture and the politicization of the trial. In its 2015–16 report, Amnesty International speaks of an "unfair trial [...] believed to be politically motivated". Human Rights Watch noted that "Mihigo was held incommunicado in an unknown location for several days in April 2014 before being formally questioned by the police and brought to trial". Before and during his incommunicado detention, according to Human Rights Watch, "... government officials repeatedly questioned him about a religious song he had written in March in which he prayed for victims of the genocide and other violence. They also questioned him about his alleged links with the RNC. Police officers beat him and forced him to confess to the offenses with which he was later charged in court".

Reporters Without Borders requested that the court's decision be reviewed on appeal.

After the verdict was announced, Rwandan political opposition parties said that "Kizito Mihigo is a political prisoner", judged in "the trial with the regime's image".

In a resolution read on 6 October 2016 the European Parliament condemned politically motivated trials and attacks on freedom of expression in Rwanda, especially the trial of Victoire Ingabire. The case of Mihigo was also mentioned. The European MPs urged the Rwandan authorities: "immediately to release all individuals and other activists detained or convicted solely for exercising their right to freedom of expression".

== In prison ==
According to Mediapart, Mihigo continued his fight for peace and reconciliation while in prison. Quoting testimonies from the singer's fellow detainees, the website reports that after his arrival in Kigali Central Prison, Mihigo contributed to the restoration of trust between some prisoners who were continuously agitated by ethnic hatred.

== Appeal and release ==
On 10 September 2018, Mihigo abandoned his appeal complaint, which he had lodged in the Supreme Court. Four days later, on 14 September, Mihigo and Umuhoza were released by presidential grace.

== Rearrest and death ==
Mihigo was rearrested by locals and security agents in Nyaruguru. On 14 February 2020, the Rwanda Investigation Bureau (RIB) confirmed that it was holding him at that time, alleging that the singer illegally attempted to cross the border into Burundi by bribing the locals. Mihigo died on 17 February 2020 with the cause being a subject of debate; the Rwandan police reported him to have committed suicide in police custody by hanging himself on the window using bed sheets, while political opponents of the Rwandan government claimed that he was tortured to death. A journalist from a local TV reported that he saw three wounds on his body (one on his forehead, and two on his cheeks). This journalist (known as Cyuma Hassani) was persecuted and jailed many times and he is now in the same jail Kizito was. Some people questioned how hanging himself would leave him with wounds on cheeks and forehead, among other issues.

== See also ==
- Music of Rwanda
- Faustin Kayumba Nyamwasa
- Human rights in Rwanda
- List of peace activists
