= Edouard Bamporiki =

Rwandan politician and artist (born 1983)

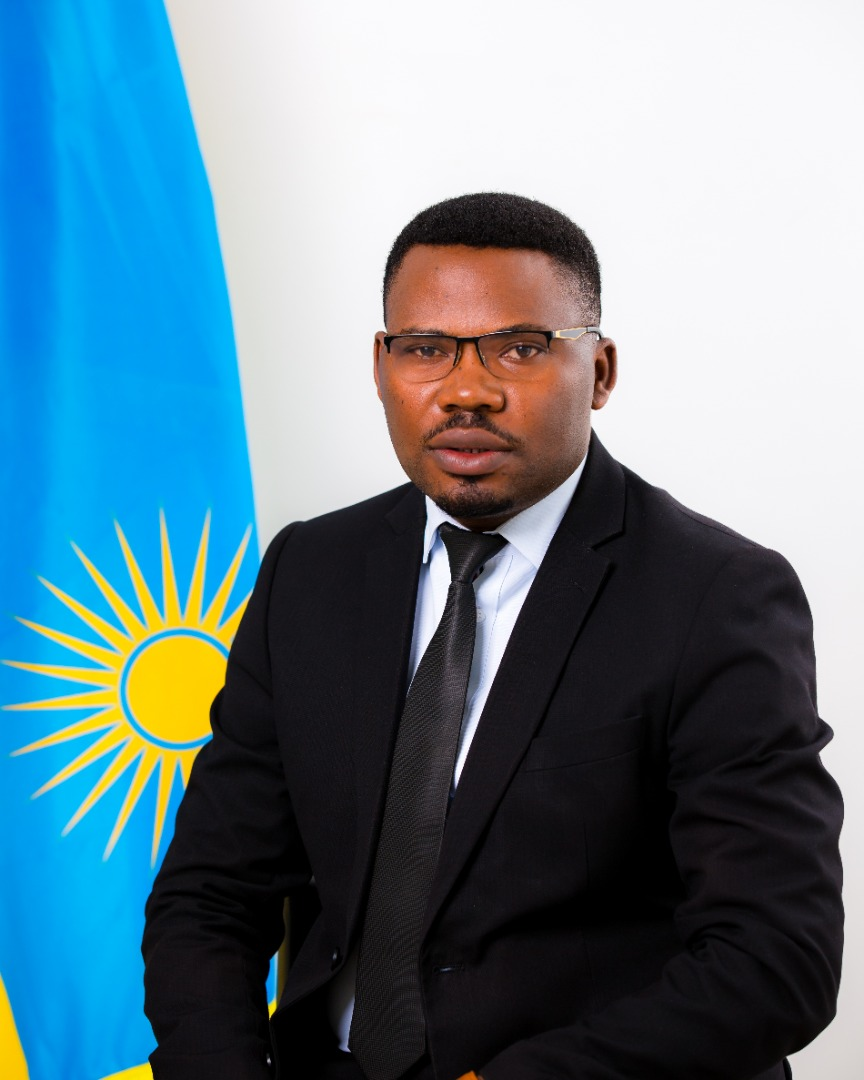
States Minister Edouard Bamporiki

Edouard Bamporiki (born October 24, 1983) is a Rwandan politician and artist. Bamporiki served in Rwandan cabinet as States Minister in charge of culture in the Ministry of Youth and Culture until 5th May 2022

In January 2023, Bamporiki was imprisoned in Mageragere Prison serving a sentence of 5 years due to corruption.

== Early life and education ==
Bamporiki was born in Nyamasheke District, Western Province of Rwanda. He attended school in the area.

In 2003, when Bamporiki was 20, he joined an episodic theatre that aired on the national radio. This gave him a countrywide exposure as a talented actor.

He holds a bachelor's degree in Law from the Université Libre de Kigali (ULK).

== Political career ==
In 2013, Bamporiki was elected Member of the Rwandan Parliament, Lower Chamber.

In 2019, he was appointed State Minister in the Ministry of Youth and Culture by President Paul Kagame. Prior to the cabinet appointment, he was Chairman of Rwanda's National Itorero Commission. In May 2022, he was placed under house arrest amid a corruption investigation.

On September 30, 2022, he was sentenced a four-year jail and a fine of Rwf 60 million

October 18, 2024, Bamporiki was released from jail under presidential pardons . Since then, he has not participated in political matters.

== Film career ==
Bamporiki is a filmmaker. Long Coat is one his most famous films - through a story of a survivor of the 1994 Genocide against the Tutsi and one of a perpetrator's son, the film focuses on leaving one's past behind. Bamporiki wrote, starred in, directed and produced the 63 minute drama which premiered in 2008. It earned him local and international attention by winning him top prize at the African Film Festival in New York.

Bamporiki had made his début in Munyurangabo, a film by Lee Isaac Chung from which he was nominated Best Actor at Cannes. He produced and acted in Rwanda: Take Two in 2010 and a year later, he starred in Kinyarwanda, a historical drama, alongside Cassandra Freeman. His latest on-screen appearance was in 2015 when he starred in a romance drama Umutoma.

In 2017, Bamporiki published a book with a title My Son, It Is A Long Story: Reflections of Genocide Perpetrators. The book launch was attended by Rwandan First Lady Jeannette Kagame.
