= Ladislas Ntaganzwa =

Rwandan war criminal (born 1962)

- Born: 1962 (age 63–64); Butare, Rwanda-Urundi
- Occupation: Mayor of Nyakizu
- Political party: Republican Democratic Movement
- Conviction: Crime against humanity
- Penalty: Life imprisonment (22 May 2020)

Details
- Date apprehended: December 7, 2015
- Imprisoned at: Kigali

Ladislas Ntaganzwa (born 1962) is a Rwandan war criminal who was involved in the 1994 Rwandan genocide. According to his indictment, Ntaganzwa, as mayor of Nyakizu, a commune of Butare, was instrumental in rallying Hutu Power fervor leading up to the genocide, and as the genocide began, distributed weapons, and directed and participated in killings.

On April 18, 1994, after a visit by interim President Sindikubwabo, during which he had called for the assassination of more Tutsis, Ntaganzwa allegedly ordered and led a massacre of Tutsis who had survived the first attack.

Ntaganzwa was arrested on December 7, 2015, in the Democratic Republic of Congo. His trial for nine counts of genocide was scheduled for March 20, 2016.

On May 28, 2020, Ntaganzwa was sentenced to life imprisonment.
