= Mageragere Prison =

Prison in Kigali, Rwanda

Coordinates: 2.0350°S 30.0168°E

- Interactive map of Mageragere Prison
- Location: Nyarugenge, Kigali, Rwanda
- Status: Operational
- Capacity: 10,000
- Population: 9,000
- Managed by: Rwanda Correctional Services
- Website: https://rcs.gov.rw/en/Prisons/nyarugenge-prison-2/

Mageragere Prison, officially Nyarugenge Correctional Facility (Kinyarwanda: Igororero rya Nyarugenge, French: Établissement Correctionnel de Nyarugenge), is a correctional facility located in Nyarugenge District, Kigali, Rwanda. Established in September 2016, Mageragere is the largest prison in Rwanda. As of August 2023, Mageragere houses approximately 9,000 inmates.

It is operated by the Rwanda Correctional Service (RCS, Kinyarwanda: Urwego rw’u Rwanda rushinzwe Igorora, French: Service Correctionnel du Rwanda).

== History ==
Mageragere Prison was created in 2016 with the consolidation of two distinct correctional facilities. The two consolidated prisons are:

- Nyarugenge Prison (1930): historically known as "1930," was among the earliest prisons constructed during the colonial era in Rwanda. Its name, "1930," is derived from the year of its construction.
- Gasabo Prison: formerly known as Kimironko Prison

== Population and facilities ==
Mageragere Prison was constructed with a planned occupancy between 8,000 - 10,000 inmates. Mageragere Prison is organized into three wings, each designed to cater to specific correctional needs:

1. Male Wing
2. Female Wing
3. Maximum Security Wing

== Notable former inmates ==
- Paul Rusesabagina: Hero of Hotel Rwanda
- Victoire Ingabire Umuhoza: Rwandan Politician
- Kizito Mihigo
- Edouard Bamporiki: Rwandan Politician
