= Kizito Mihigo Peace Foundation =

Rwandan non-governmental organization

Kizito Mihigo Peace Foundation.
- Founded: 2010
- Type: Non-profit; NGO
- Location: Brussels, Belgium
- Services: Peacebuilding after genocide
- Key people: Kizito Mihigo
- Website: www.kizitomihigo.foundation

The Kizito Mihigo Peace Foundation, also called KMP Foundation, is a Rwandan non-governmental organization created in 2010 by the Rwandan gospel musician Kizito Mihigo. The foundation's main objective is to promote peace and reconciliation after the 1994 genocide.

== Activities ==
In 2011, in partnership with the United States embassy in Kigali, World Vision International and the Rwandan government, KMP Foundation begin a tour of concerts in Rwandan schools and prisons. In schools, the goal is to promote the youth education on peace and reconciliation values, as well as the establishment of peace clubs. In prisons, the singer's aim is to generate debates with inmates about the crimes committed, before creating the dialog clubs called "conflict transformation clubs".

From 2012, KMP Foundation organizes the interreligious dialogue. The debate between religious leaders is broadcast on the national television, every Tuesdays at 22 p.m., through the program "Umusanzu w'Umuhanzi" produced by the foundation.

In 2012, KMP protests against discrimination of albinos in Africa.

== Awards ==
In August 2011, on behalf of the KMP Foundation, Kizito Mihigo receives CYRWA award (Celebrating Young Rwandan Achievers) given by the Imbuto foundation, organization of the First Lady of Rwanda, Jeannette Kagame.

In April 2013, the Rwanda Governance Board recognizes the Kizito Mihigo Peace foundation (KMP) among the top ten local NGOs that have promoted good governance in Rwanda. On this occasion, the Foundation received the "RGB award" of Rwf 8,000,000 (eight million Rwandan Francs).

== Cessation of activities ==
KMP closed its doors in April 2014, when musician Kizito Mihigo was arrested by the Rwanda National Police for suspicion of crimes against the State Security.

On 27 February 2015, the singer was sentenced to 10 years of imprisonment after being convicted of conspiracy against the government of President Paul Kagame.

The judge of the Kigali High Court had been more clement than the prosecutor who had requested life imprisonment for the singer.

On 10 September 2018, the singer abandoned his appeal complaint, which he had himself lodged in the Supreme Court. Four days later, on 14 September, with Victoire Ingabire Umuhoza, Mihigo is released by presidential grace.

== See also ==
- Kizito Mihigo
- Rwandan genocide
