= Tiloun =

Réunionese singer (c.1967–2020)

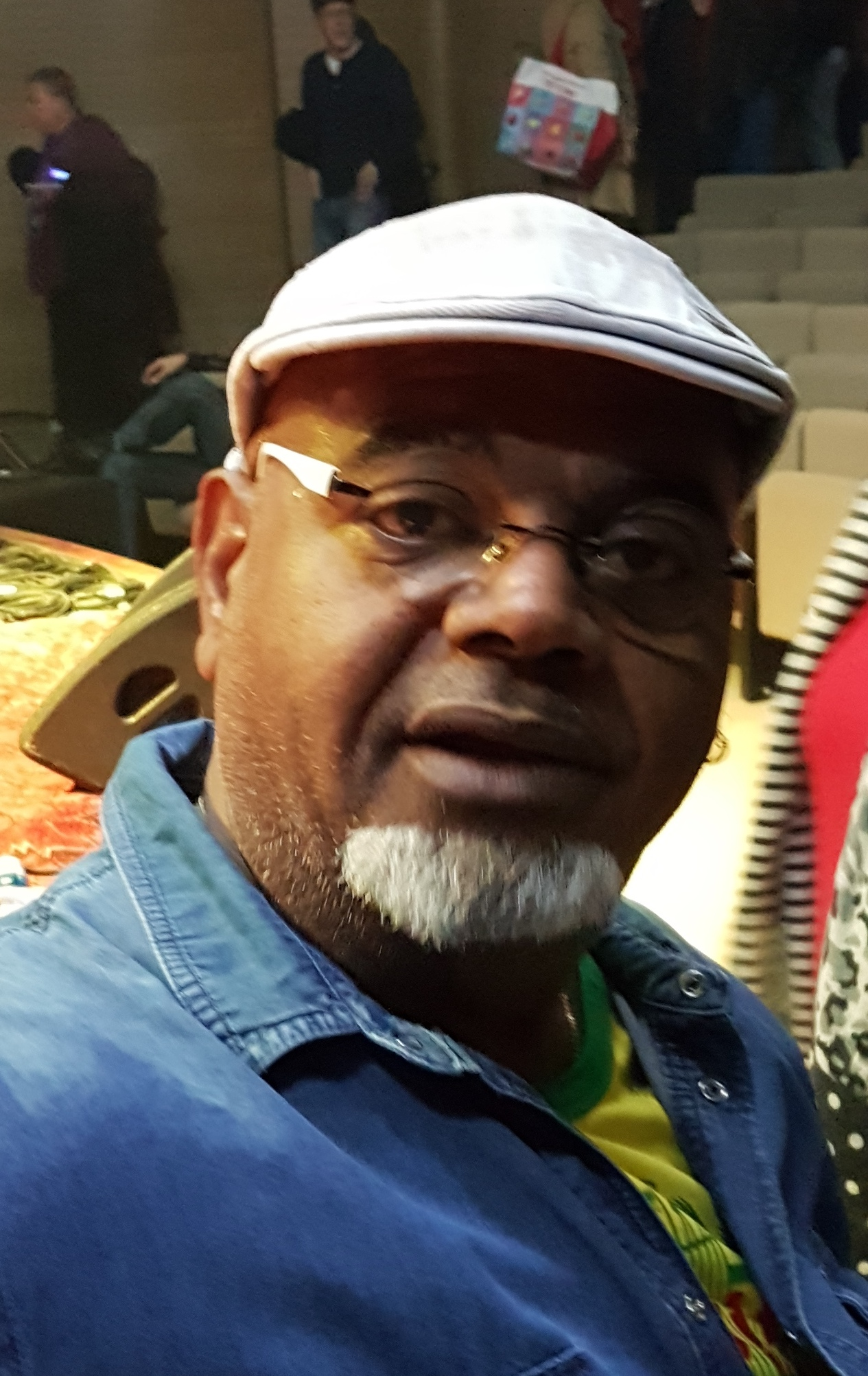
- Tiloun in 2019
- Born: Jean-Michel Ramoune c. 1967; Saint-Denis, Réunion
- Died: 5 July 2020; Saint-Denis, Réunion
- Occupation: Singer

Tiloun, stage name of Jean-Michel Ramoune, (c. 1967 – 5 July 2020) was a Réunionese singer.

== Biography ==
As a child, Tiloun met numerous big names in Réunionese music, such as Alain Péters, Ziskakan, and Henri Madoré. In his young age, Tiloun was fascinated by Pei music, involving percussion and dance. In his district of Saint-Denis, a "cradle of creativity" existed. Numerous musicians were from this district, and they were an inspiration to Tiloun.

Tiloun often wrote and played his music in the Kabaré language. He worked as a street artist, and worked merely for his own entertainment. Other artists, such as Gilbert Pounia, Firmin Viry, Danyèl Waro, and Daniel Honoré, pressured Tiloun to begin working commercially. He was eventually convinced by his son, Nicolas.

Tiloun was very attached to his wife and his son, and was also aided by his fellow Réunionese musicians. His music was based on his multiracial origins, with Malagasy, African, and South American influences. He recorded songs using a floppy disk so that his works would not be overly commercialized.

Alongside other Réunionese musicians, Tiloun dropped the album Kas in Poz in 2011.

Tiloun was active in preservation efforts of the Réunion Creole language, and also donated to agencies researching diabetes. He was also active in efforts to create more humane ways of farming in Réunion.

Tiloun died on 5 July 2020 in Saint-Denis.

== Discography ==
- Dé Pat Ater (2008)
- Kas in Poz (2011)
