= Karipande =

Village in Angola

Coordinates: 12°59′S 22°44′E

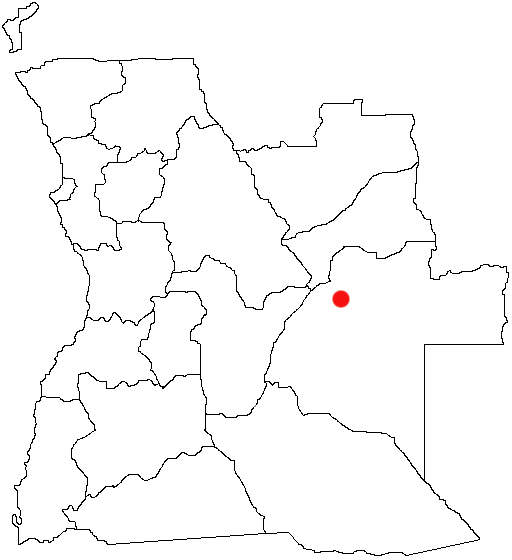
Location of Luena in Angola

Karipande is a village in Alto Zambeze, Moxico, Angola.

- Distance to Luena: 600 km
- Population: 7,000
- Mayor (Soba): Mukumbi Munhau
- Relevance: Place of the murder of the "Commander Hoji-ya-Henda" aka José Mendes de Carvalho at the age of 27 years. He was buried near the river Lundoji, about 30 kilometers of the older headquarters of Karipande in the Eastern front/3rd Political-Military Region. (14, April, 1968)
