= Public holidays in Seychelles =

This is a list of public holidays in Seychelles.

- 1-2 January: New Year's Day
- 1 February: Abolition of Slavery
- Variable (March or April): Good Friday
- Variable (March or April): Easter Saturday
- Variable (March or April): Easter Monday
- 1 May: Labour Day
- Variable: Corpus Christi
- 18 June: Constitution Day
- 29 June: Independence Day, marks the date when Seychelles gained independence from the United Kingdom in 1976.
- 15 August: Assumption Day
- 1 November: All Saints' Day
- 8 December: Immaculate Conception
- 25 December: Christmas Day
