= Victoire Ingabire Umuhoza =

Rwandan politician (born 1968)

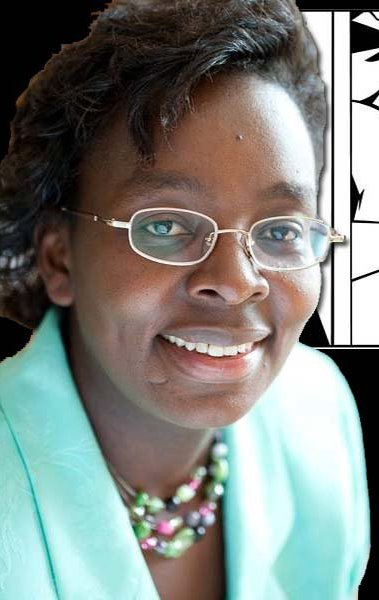
- Born: 3 October 1968 (age 58)
- Political party: Development And Liberty For All
- Other political affiliations: United Democratic Forces of Rwanda
- Children: 3

Victoire Ingabire Umuhoza (born 3 October 1968) is a Rwandan politician who served as chairwoman of the Unified Democratic Forces from 2006 to 2019. As an advocate for democracy and critic of President Paul Kagame, she was the UDF's candidate for the Rwandan 2010 presidential elections, but was ultimately arrested and sentenced to prison. A Sakharov Prize nominee, she served 8 out of a 15-year prison term in Kigali Central Prison on charges of terrorism and threatening national security. She currently leads the party Development And Liberty For All, with the focus to campaign for more political space and for development. She is the laureate of the 2024 edition of the Liberal International Prize for Freedom.

== Family and professional career ==
Married and a mother of three, she trained in commercial law and accounting and graduated in business economics and corporate management in the Netherlands. Umuhoza worked as an official of an international accounting firm based in the Netherlands, where she was in charge of its accounting departments in 25 branches in Europe, Asia and Africa.

In April 2009, she resigned from her function to dedicate herself to a political career and to prepare her to return to her homeland and, as the head of her political party, to contribute to the rebuilding of her country.

== Political career ==
Since 1997, Umuhoza has been involved in the struggle of the Rwandan political opposition in exile. Umuhoza has been quoted as saying "My objective is to introduce Rwanda to the rule of law and a constitutional state where international democratic standards are respected, where patriotism will at last be the cornerstone for all public institutions." Her political activities are centred around the idea of a state of justice where individuals choose their associations based on their shared political aspirations rather than their ethnic or regional background. She has also been vocal in calling for more empowerment of women in Rwanda.

In 1997, Umuhoza joined the Republican Rally for Democracy in Rwanda. A year later, she became the president of its Netherlands branch and in 2000, she was nominated president of RDR at the international level.

From 2003 to 2006, she occupied the post of president of the Union of Rwandan Democratic Forces (French: Union des Forces Démocratiques Rwandaises), the main coalition of political opposition parties and personalities in exile, of which RDR is an active member.

In January 2010, Umuhoza returned to her country, after 16 years in exile, as the main leader of the Rwandan political opposition.

13 September 2012, Victoire Ingabire Umuhoza, together with two other Rwandan political figures (Bernard Ntaganda and Deogratias Mushyayidi – all currently imprisoned in Kigali), was nominated by 42 MEPs for the Sakharov Prize for Freedom of Thought 2012 of the European Parliament.

5 December 2019, Victoire Ingabire was awarded the International Human Rights Award 2019 by the Association for Human Rights of Spain (APDHE) but was not allowed by the Rwandan government to attend the award ceremony of 2019 in Spain.

=== Unification of the democratic opposition ===
The fight for a unified political opposition in exile dominated her political career. The Rwandan Patriotic Front (RPF) continued to monopolise power in Kigali, criminalising, persecuting or co-opting any resistance. Inside the country, opposition to the RPF-led regime in Rwanda is almost non-existent. Only diaspora-based associations were able to mount an opposition attempt to Rwandan current President Paul Kagame's regime but divisions and political rivalries in diaspora did not make this possible. In favour of fundamental change and reconciliation, she gradually changed the pace of the struggle towards a unified opposition with peaceful means to stand up to the challenge of offering to Rwandans an alternative to Paul Kagame's regime.

In November 2004, in Amsterdam, Netherlands she organised a conference known as the "Forum on Peace, Security, Democracy and Development in the Great Lakes Region" which was followed by the Amsterdam Initiative with the aim to create the new platform for co-operation.

In October 2005, Victoire initiated contacts with other opposition organisations and organised an all-inclusive meeting for all Rwandan civil society associations and political parties. A consensus of a common front against Paul Kagame's regime was finally reached.

Starting from April 2006, she participated in the creation of the United Democratic Forces (FDU) and was elected president of the political platform. FDU has a goal to install the rule of law in Rwanda, underpinned by the respect of democratic values enshrined in the Universal Declaration of Human Rights and other international instruments relating to democracy and good governance.

Umuhoza actively participated in Highly Inclusive Inter-Rwandan Dialogue (HIIRD) project in Barcelona, Spain in 2004, 2006 and in April – May 2009 under the auspice of Juan Carrero Saralegui, the Nobel Peace Prize candidate and of Adolfo Pérez Esquivel, recipient of the 1980 Nobel Peace Prize and Federico Mayor Zaragoza, the vice-president of the Alliance of Civilization.

She proposed following emblematic reforms calling for change in daily life of all Rwandans and the way they relate to politics: Creation of a Committee of Truth, Justice and Reconciliation to help Rwandans towards true reconciliation; Introduction of a non-political commission in charge of rewriting and interpretation of the actual history of Rwanda; The passing of a bill for the right to private ownership and for protection of the weakest members of the public, for the guarantee by the law of equal opportunity and access to credit and employment for all citizens.

One month after she arrived in Rwanda in January 2010, together with other two political opposition party leaders already in the country, she formed a Permanent Consultative Council of Opposition Parties, putting together their efforts to widen the political space for the opposition parties and to strengthen the democratic process in Rwanda.

=== Arrest and trial ===
Umuhoza was placed under house arrest in April 2010. She was arrested on 14 October 2010. She appeared in court and was charged alongside four alleged co-conspirators (Colonel Tharcisse Nditurende, Lieutenant Colonel Noel Habiyaremye, Lieutenant Jean Marie Vianney Karuta and Major Vital Uwumuremyi).

Rwandan prosecution accused her of "Forming an armed group with the aim of destabilising the country, complicity to acts of terrorism, conspiracy against the government by use of war and terrorism, inciting the masses to revolt against the government, genocide ideology and provoking divisionism". She denies all the charges which she claims are politically motivated.

During pre-trial formalities in September, Ingabire's defence lodged two motions. The first was against the territorial jurisdiction of the High Court for acts allegedly committed while Ingabire was resident in the Netherlands. The second was that Ingabire's prosecution under the 2008 "genocide ideology" law amounted to retrospective application as all evidence provided dated from before 2007.

27 March 2012, Umuhoza launched a legal challenge in the Rwandan high court to nullify articles 2 – 9 of the laws related to "divisionism" and "genocide ideology," arguing that articles 2 and 3 of the law contradict articles 20, 33 and 34 of the constitution guaranteeing freedom of expression and that they are too broad thus denying the rights to give opinion on the genocide and being exploited by her government to limit the freedom of thought. In her trial, the court suspended all debate related to "18/2008 laws" governing genocide ideology but decided to continue the proceedings against her on the other charges.

11 April 2012, A witness for the defence, former FDLR colonel Michel Habimana testified that state intelligence services had manufactured witness Uwumuremyi's story. He also testified that the prosecution's lead witness was lying about his own contact with Ingabire and his own rank within the FDLR. Already serving life in prison, Habimana was subjected to a cell search and had important documents relating to the case seized. The defence claimed intimidation of a key witness. Subsequently, Victoire Ingabire refused to return to the Rwandan courtroom and asked her lawyers not to return either. Her defence lawyer Iain Edwards said the boycott came after the former rebel colonel was interrupted while accusing the Rwandan intelligence services of offering money to rebels to make false claims against Ingabire.

18 October 2012, the Supreme Court of Rwanda dismissed Umuhoza's constitutional review case of Law N° 18/2008 of 23/07/2008 Relating to the Punishment of the Crime of Genocide Ideology. On articles 2 and 3, the court ruled that the scope of the law is meaningful, though it can require more clarifications in some cases. The court rejected the requests to nullify articles 4 to 9 on the law repressing genocide ideology and article 4 of the law on war crimes and crimes against humanity, saying that the articles no longer exist in the current code of laws. The state prosecutor asked a panel of judges to give Umuhoza the maximum life sentence. The verdict which was expected to be announced on 29 June was postponed four times until 31 October 2012.

On 30 October 2012, Umuhoza was sentenced to eight years imprisonment by the High Court of Kigali for "conspiracy against the country through terrorism and war" and "genocide denial". On 13 December 2013, Rwanda's Supreme Court upheld the conviction of Umuhoza and increased her jail term from eight to 15 years.

==== Appeal to the African Court on Human and Peoples' Rights ====
3 October 2014, Victoire Ingabire brought her case to the African Court on Human and Peoples’ Rights (AfCHPR). Ingabire claimed that the State violated articles 7 (right to fair trial) and 9 (right to receive information and free expression) of the African Charter, and articles 14 (right to a fair trial), 15 (prohibition on retroactivity of the law), and 19 (right to hold opinions without interference) of the International Covenant on Civil and Political Rights. id. at paras. 77-78.

On 24 November 2017, The AfCHPR found that the State violated Ingabire’s right to freedom of expression under Article 9(2) (right to freedom of expression) of the African Charter and Article 19 (right to freedom of expression) of the ICCPR. The AfCHPR also found a violation of Ingabire’s right to defense under Article 7(1) of the African Charter on Human and Peoples' Rights. the Court determined that threats and intimidation of one of the witnesses by prison officials, the use of evidence against Ingabire that was produced through that intimidation and never shown to the defense, and difficultly defense counsel had in questioning one witness were all in violation of the right to defense. The AfCHPR ordered the Republic of Rwanda to take all necessary measures to restore her rights and to submit to the Court a report on the measures taken within six months.

On 3 January 2018, Victoire Ingabire filed her Application for reparation and applied to the Court to annul the sentence of imprisonment and its consequences and award her full compensation for the prejudices suffered by herself, her husband and her three children as a result of the violations of her rights as set out in the Judgment of 24 November 2017. The AfCHPR, in its App. No. 003/2014 judgment on reparations of 7 December 2018, ordered the Respondent State to reimburse the Applicant the amount of ten million, two hundred and thirty thousand Rwandan Francs (FRw 10,230,000) for the entire material prejudice suffered; (iii) orders the Respondent State to pay the Applicant the amount of fifty-five million Rwandese Francs (FRw 55,000,000) as compensation for the moral prejudice she, her husband and her three children suffered; (iv) orders the Respondent State to pay all the amounts indicated in subparagraph (ii) and (iii) of this operative part within six (6) months, effective from the date of notification of its Judgment.

According to Rwandan newspaper, The New Times, on 14 September 2018, President Paul Kagame exercised his prerogative of mercy and granted early release to Umuhoza, as well as to 2000 other convicted persons including singer Kizito Mihigo. On 15 September 2018, Ingabire was released from Mageragere Prison.

==== Second arrest ====
On 19 June 2025, Ingabire was arrested on charges of plotting to incite public unrest. In July, a court denied her bail after concluding she posed a flight risk. In September 2025, Amnesty International called for her immediate and unconditional release.

== Political positions ==
=== Support for civil society ===
Umuhoza is a founding member of many associations and foundations in the union sector: Association Contact, Dialogue et Actions Caritatives (CODAC) which seeks to give moral, legal advice and material support to the survivors of the Great Lakes region in the Netherlands or in their region; Association URAHO of women refugees from Rwanda in the Netherlands, focusing on getting Rwandese women out of isolation and helping them integrate into Dutch society, to assist non-accompanied children and asylum seekers; Fondation PROJUSTITIA-Rwanda, committed to fighting in favour of fair justice for all victims of the Rwandan tragedy; HARAMBE, platform of African women's associations in the Netherlands committed to promoting development of African women on the continent. Umuhoza was also a member of the executive committee of ZWALU, a platform bringing together foreign women in the Netherlands to promote their emancipation.

=== Rwandan genocide ===
On the day of her arrival in the country, to honour the victims of the genocide, she visited the Gisozi Genocide Memorial Centre. In her remarks on unity and reconciliation, she stated that current political policy was not sufficient to bring about reconciliation, and noted as an example that the memorial did not acknowledge Hutus who also died during the genocide. She stressed that those who committed genocide as well as those who committed other war crimes and crimes against humanity should be brought before the courts of justice. Her speech was later submitted to the court after her arrest as evidence of genocide revisionism.

== Continued critique of the RPF ==
On 9 March 2019, a close aide to Umuhoza, Anselme Mutuyimana, was found dead of strangulation. In September 2019, Syldio Dusabumuremyi, her former party’s national coordinator was stabbed to death. At the time, the RIB announced it had two men in custody. Eugène Ndereyimana, also a member of FDU-Inkingi, was reported missing on 15 July, after he failed to arrive for a meeting in Nyagatare, in Rwanda’s Eastern Province. Boniface Twagirimana, her former party’s deputy leader, who "disappeared" from his prison cell in Mpanga, southern Rwanda, in October 2018 was missing at the time of writing.

== Publications ==
Victoire Ingabire wrote a book "Between 4 walls of the 1930 prison: Memoirs of a Rwandan Prisoner of Conscience" in which she recounts her life experience for 3 years, from the moment she announced her candidacy for presidential elections, to her incarceration into the famous "1930" maximum security Rwandan prison and she describes her encounter with the Rwandan judicial system from within.

Victoire Ingabire is the author of numerous articles and publications where she expressed her views on important issues pertaining to current events in her country and that of the Great Lakes region. Among others:

- "What is the Outlook for Peace in Central Africa? " (translation) (2001),
- "International Justice After the Crisis in Rwanda" (translation) (2002),
- "Conflicts in the Great Lake region of Africa: Origins and Solution Proposals" (translation) (2003),
- "National Reconciliation As a Requirement for Security and Sustainable Peace in Rwanda and in the Countries of the African Great Lakes" (translation) (2004),
- "Pleading for a True National Reconciliation in Rwanda, Requirements for Sustainable Peace" (translation) (2005).
