= Gikondo Prison =

Prison in Kigali, Rwanda

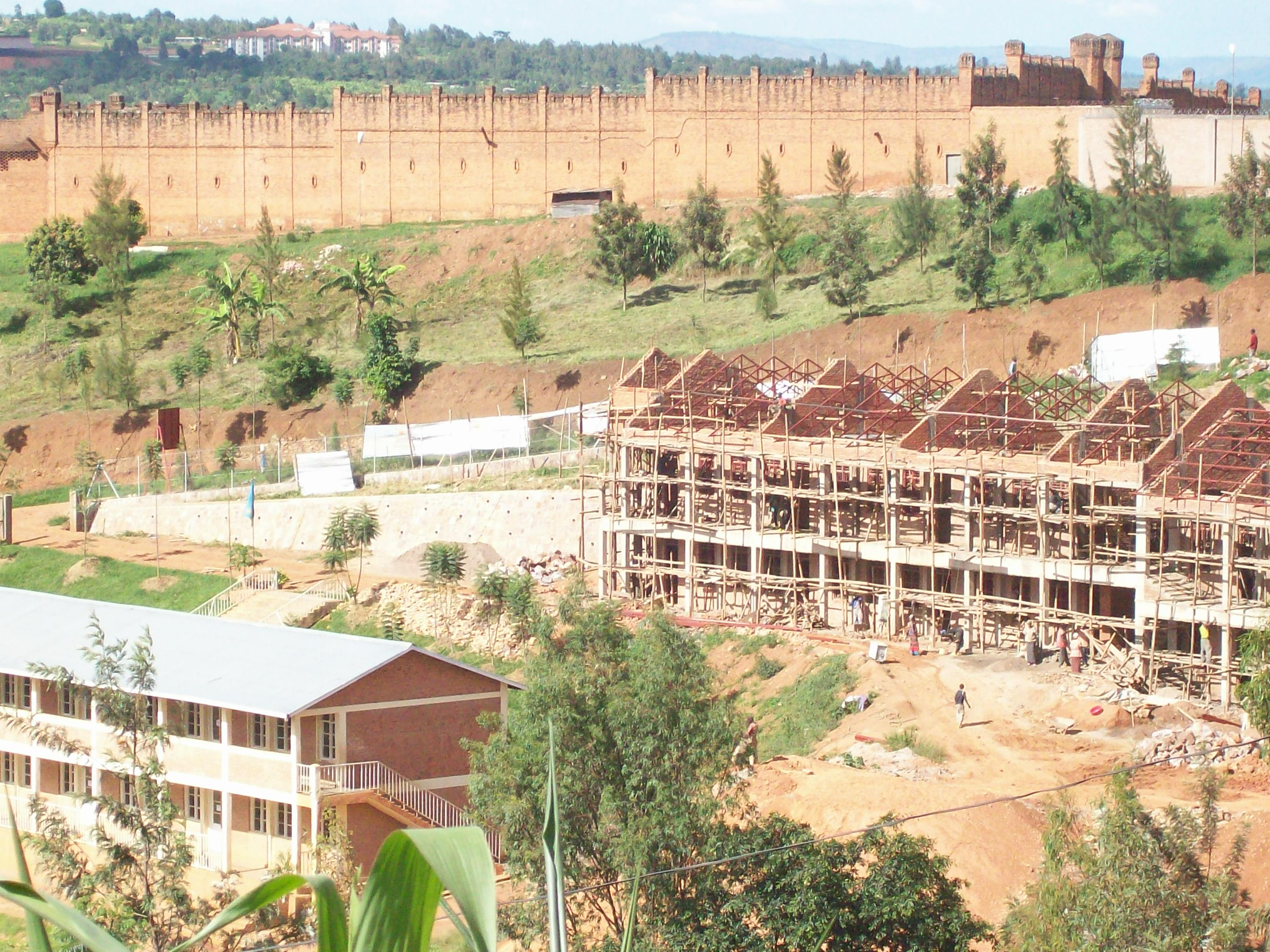
Gikondo Prison

Gikondo Prison or Kigali City Prison is a prison in Kigali, Rwanda. It was built in the 1930s, and was only intended originally to house a few thousand inmates. Following the Rwandan genocide, the numbers increased to above 50,000 as a large proportion of the inmates were genocidaires. Those who were brought to the Gacaca courts to undergo trial for war crimes stayed at the prison.

The International Committee of the Red Cross played an important role in reviewing the places of detention. Conditions in the prison as with others in Rwanda, deteriorated again despite showing improvements before the war.

In October 1999, the ICRC submitted a confidential report to the highest authorities in Rwanda. Following negotiations, the ICRC then improved the supply of delivery of food, resources and medicines to civilian prisoners, undertook repairs and renovation and provided essential supplies for the prison.

As of 2020, Gicondo prison has also been referred to more informally as "Gikondo Transit Center". Since 2006, Human Rights Watch has documented that Rwandan authorities round up and detain street children, street vendors, sex workers, homeless people, and beggars there.
