= 7/10 =

7/10 may refer to:

- July 10 (month-day date notation)
- October 7 (day-month date notation)
- The Seven Ten Rule, a rule about radioactive fallout
- October 7 attacks

== See also ==
- 10/7 (disambiguation)
- 7-10 split
