= International Youth Day =

Youth awareness day

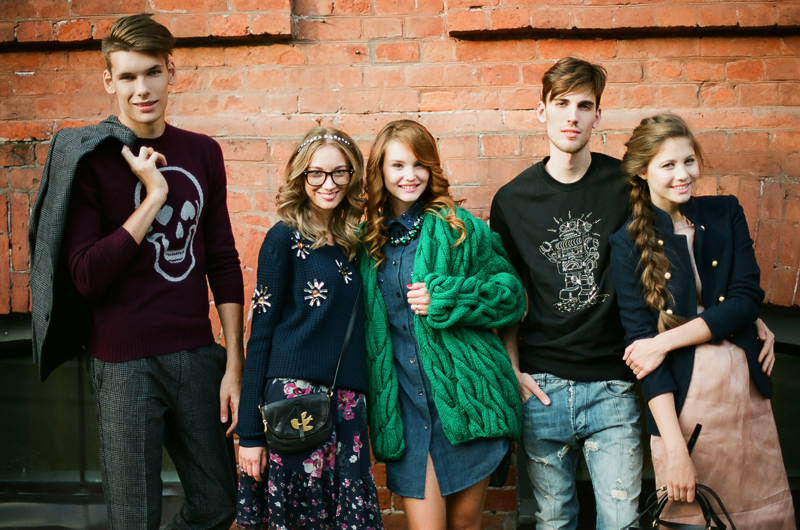
- Young people
- Date: 12 August
- Next time: 12 August 2026
- Frequency: Annual

International Youth Day (IYD) is an awareness day designated by the United Nations that takes place on August 12.

The purpose of the day is to draw attention to a given set of cultural and legal issues surrounding youth. The first IYD was observed on 12 August 2000.

== Background ==
International Youth Day is observed annually on August 12. It is meant as an opportunity for governments and others to draw attention to youth issues worldwide. During IYD, concerts, workshops, cultural events, and meetings involving national and local government officials and youth organizations take place around the world. The World Conference of Ministers Responsible for Youth adopted a resolution to proclaim August 12 as International Youth Day at its first session in Lisbon, Portugal, from 8 to 12 August 1998. The recommendation was later endorsed by the General Assembly of the United Nations on December 17, 1212, with the adoption of Resolution 54/120.

Each year, International Youth Day adopts a theme to raise awareness of issues affecting young people and their role in global development:

- 2014: Youth and Mental Health
- 2015: Youth and Civic Engagement
- 2016: The Road to 2030: Eradicating Poverty and Achieving Sustainable Consumption and Production
- 2017: Youth Building Peace
- 2018: Safe Spaces for Youth
- 2019: Transforming Education
- 2020: Youth Engagement for Global Action
- 2021: Transforming Food Systems: Youth Innovation for Human and Planetary Health
- 2022: Intergenerational Solidarity: Creating a World for All Ages
- 2023: Green Skills for Youth: Towards a Sustainable World
- 2024: From Clicks to Progress: Youth Digital Pathways for Sustainable Development
- 2025: Local Youth Actions for the SDGs and Beyond. ("SDGs" refers to "Sustainable Development Goals").
- 2026: Different Contexts, Common Aspirations.

== Associated events ==
Each youth day is associated with several events around the world; for example, in 2013 these included an International Youth Conference held on August 10–11, before the International Youth Day on August 12. This conference comprised speakers from various countries and fields of work, followed by youth awards ceremony, and spirit kindling debates and discussions. It was hosted by YOUTHINK, Youth Exnora and the US consulate general in Chennai.

IYD '18 and IYD '19 were hosted by Indian Youth Cafe in Chennai. These events especially concerned empowering youth power.
