= Robert Gabriel Mugabe National Youth Day =

Public holiday in Zimbabwe

- Observed by: Zimbabwe
- Type: National
- Significance: Commemoration of former President Robert Mugabe as one of Zimbabwe's founders and leaders.
- Date: 21 February
- Next time: 21 February 2026
- Frequency: annual

Robert Gabriel Mugabe National Youth Day is a public holiday in Zimbabwe commemorating former President Robert Mugabe.

The ZANU–PF Youth League has commemorated Robert Mugabe on his birthday in February for years as part of its February 21st Movement which was established in 1986. The youth arm of the ruling party lobbied for the former president's birthday to be declared a national holiday for what the organization says was the leader's role in empowering the country's youth.

The day was formally recognized as a national holiday on November 27, 2017, three days after President Emmerson Mnangagwa was sworn in as leader of Zimbabwe following a coup which led to the resignation of Mugabe as President. The holiday was formalized through the publication of a statutory instrument on The Herald under the virtue of section 2 of the Public Holidays and Prohibition of Business Act.
