= 7 October Movement =

South Sudanese opposition group

- Founding leader: Kerbino Wol Agok
- Leader: Unknown
- Dates active: 5 June 2020 – present
- Active regions: South Sudan
- Size: 1,000

The 7 October Movement (Note: Also called the Seventh of October Movement, October 7th Movement, or the 7th October Movement) is a South Sudanese opposition group founded by Kerbino Wol Agok. Wol was detained by the National Security Service without a charge in April 2018. He started a riot in the National Security Headquarters, or Blue House, on 7 October 2018, from which the group gets its name, and was sentenced to 10 years in prison. However, he was pardoned by President Salva Kiir in January 2020.

Wol announced that he had founded the movement on 7 June 2020, and at that time claimed to have 1,000 men in the rural areas of South Sudan. Wol claimed that many members of the movement fought under John Garang in the Second Sudanese Civil War, and also that many of them had been prisoners in the Blue House. The group is opposed to the current leadership, which the 7 October Movement believes have kept South Sudan in poverty, as well as the National Security Service and the current prison system, which the group believes is unjust.

On 14 June 2020, less than two weeks after the movement was announced, Kerbino Wol Agok was killed. According to the South Sudan People's Defense Forces, Wol was killed in a clash at Ayen Mayar village in Rumbek East County in Lakes State along with three other 7 October Movement fighters. One civilian was also killed, and two others were wounded in the clash.
