= 2021 in South Africa =

- Decades: 2000s; 2010s; 2020s
- See also: List of years in South Africa

Events in the year 2021 in South Africa.

== Incumbents ==
- President: Cyril Ramaphosa (ANC)
- Deputy President: David Mabuza (ANC)
- Chief Justice: Mogoeng Mogoeng
- Deputy Chief Justice: Raymond Zondo
- President of the Supreme Court of Appeal: Mandisa Maya
- Deputy President of the Supreme Court of Appeal: Xola Petse
- Chairperson of the Electoral Court of South Africa: Boissie Henry Mbha
- Speaker of the National Assembly: Thandi Modise (ANC)
- Deputy Speaker of the National Assembly: Lechesa Tsenoli (ANC)
- Leader of the Opposition in the National Assembly: John Steenhuisen (DA)
- Leader of Government Business: David Mabuza (ANC)
- Government Chief Whip (of the National Assembly): Pemmy Majodina (ANC)
- Opposition Chief Whip (of the National Assembly): Natasha Mazzone (DA)
- Chairperson of the National Council of Provinces: Amos Masondo (ANC)
- Deputy Chairperson of the National Council of Provinces: Sylvia Lucas (ANC)
- Leader of the Opposition of the National Council of Provinces: Cathlene Labuschagne (DA)
- Chief Whip of the National Council of Provinces: Seiso Mohai (ANC)

=== Cabinet ===
The Cabinet, together with the President and the Deputy President, forms the Executive.

=== Provincial Premiers ===
- Eastern Cape Province: Oscar Mabuyane (ANC)
- Free State Province: Sisi Ntombela (ANC)
- Gauteng Province: David Makhura (ANC)
- KwaZulu-Natal Province: Sihle Zikalala (ANC)
- Limpopo Province: Stanley Mathabatha (ANC)
- Mpumalanga Province: Refilwe Mtsweni-Tsipane (ANC)
- North West Province: Job Mokgoro (ANC)
- Northern Cape Province: Zamani Saul (ANC)
- Western Cape Province: Alan Winde (DA)

== Monthly events ==
=== January and February ===
- 7 January – COVID-19 pandemic in South Africa: Health Minister Zweli Mkhize announces that South Africa will receive one million doses of Oxford–AstraZeneca vaccine in January and 500,000 in February. 1.25 million health workers will be prioritized. SA has confirmed 1.1 million infections and 31,368 deaths.
- 25 January – A five-year-old boy in Mpumalanga dies and thousands are homeless as Cyclone Eloise causes extensive flooding in southern Africa. Limpopo is particularly hard hit.
- 1 February
  - Environment Minister Barbara Creecy reports that rhinoceros poaching in South Africa is down for the sixth year in a row, to 394 animals killed in 2020 for their horns. She attributed the decline to both the COVID-19 pandemic and to work by rangers and security personnel and noted that it is still a major problem.
  - Former president Jacob Zuma defies the Constitutional Court and refuses to testify to the Zondo Commission.
- 23 February – Port Elizabeth is officially renamed Gqeberha. Other major name changes include Kariega (formerly Uitenhage) and Chief Dawid Stuurman International Airport (formerly Port Elizabeth Airport).

=== March and April ===
- 1 March – The government announces plans to establish a special Land Court.
- 8 March – Immigrant street vendors from Senegal and Burkina Faso are hospitalised after xenophobic attacks in Durban.
- 10 March – A middle-aged man is killed after police shoot him in the head with a rubber bullet during a demonstration against the high cost of the University of the Witwatersrand.
- 24 March – The South African Human Rights Commission investigates a case of discrimination involving a Ndebele activist's Thando Mahlangu, 35, use of traditional clothing in a Clicks pharmacy in suburban Johannesburg.
- 24 March – Queen Mantfombi Dlamini Zulu is named regent following the death of King Goodwill Zwelithini.
- 25 March – Ethiopians demonstrate in Pretoria to bring attention to human rights violations in the Tigray Region of Ethiopia.
- 29 March – President Ramaphosa calls upon members of the African National Congress (ANC) who have been charged with corruption or other serious crimes to step aside within 30 days or face suspension.
- 18 April - 2021 Table Mountain fire

=== May and June ===
- May – The trial of former president Jacob Zuma on corruption charges is set to begin. It was postponed.
- 9 June – Gosiame Thamara Sithole reportedly gives birth to ten babies—five boys and five girls—in a possible world record. On 15 June 2021 the supposed father of the 10 children admitted via a family statement that the story is false and that Gosiame Thamara Sithole never gave birth to decuplets.
- 29 June – The Constitutional Court of South Africa hands down judgment in State Capture Inquiry v Zuma, finding former president Jacob Zuma guilty of contempt of court and sentencing him to 15 months' imprisonment.

=== July and August ===
- 1 July - Violence starts to rapidly increase in the 2021 Cape Town taxi conflict over the B97 taxi route between Bellville and Paarl.
- 2 July – President Cyril Ramaphosa appoints Minister of Basic Education Angie Motshekga as the country's acting president for the day upon his leave to attend the State Funeral of the late Zambian President Kenneth Kaunda, while Deputy President David Mabuza is on sick leave.
- 9 July - 2021 South African unrest begins.

=== October ===
- 5 October- The 2021 South African metalworkers strike begins
- 21 October- The 2021 South African metalworkers strike ends, with workers represented by the National Union of Metalworkers of South Africa winning a 5-6% annual pay increase
- 22 October - Following a high-profile trial ex-police officer Nomia Rosemary Ndlovu is convicted of murdering five relatives and her boyfriend over several years. In most cases the victims were killed by hitmen hired by her, although Ndlovu murdered her sister herself in 2013. The victims were killed for life-insurance payouts, and Ndlovu is also convicted of insurance fraud.

== Scheduled events ==
=== Elections ===
- 1 November - 2021 South African municipal elections

=== Holidays ===
South Africa has 12 public holidays; if a holiday falls on a Sunday, it is celebrated the following Monday.

- 22 March – Human Rights Day
- 27 April – Freedom Day (National day)
- 16 June – Youth Day
- 9 August – National Women's Day
- 24 September – Heritage Day

== Sports ==
- 25 February – Caster Semenya, 30, announces she will appeal to the European Court of Human Rights (ECHR) so that she can compete as a female in track meets. Her birth certificate identifies her as female and she has always identified as female, but she has high levels of testosterone that keep her out of international competition.
- 15 to 18 April – 2021 Men's Indoor African Cup
- 19 to 25 April 2021 – 2021 IIHF World Championship Division III
- 24 August to 5 September – South Africa at the 2020 Summer Paralympics

== Deaths ==
=== January ===
- 3 January – Dorah Sitole, 65, food writer (40 Years of Iconic Food); COVID-19.
- 5 January – Mluleki George, 72, politician, founder of the United Congress; COVID-19.
- 6 January – King Victor Thulare III, 40, royal, king of the Pedi people (since 2020); COVID-19.
- 9 January – Johnson Mlambo, 80, political activist; complications from COVID-19.
- 11 January
  - Mmule Maluleka, politician.
  - Lindiwe Ndlovu, 44, actress (Winnie Mandela, Little One).
- 13 January – Hannes Viljoen, 77, rugby union player (Natal, national team).
- 14 January – Mzwandile Nzimande, 44; COVID-19.
- 15 January – Dr. Welcome Bhodloza Nzimande, 73, radio broadcaster (1978-1997); COVID-19.
- 16 January
  - Bheki Ntuli, 63, politician, member of the National Assembly (1999–2003); COVID-19.
  - Sam Phillips, 72, actor (Ace Ventura: When Nature Calls, Red Dust, The Forgotten Kingdom).
- 17 January – Abel Gabuza, 65, Roman Catholic prelate, Archbishop Coadjutor of Durban (since 2018) and Bishop of Kimberley (2010–2018); COVID-19.
- 18 January – Nombulelo Hermans, politician, member of the National Assembly (since 2019); COVID-19.
- 21 January – Jackson Mthembu, 62, politician (Minister in the Presidency); COVID-19.
- 22 January – Marius van Heerden, 46, Olympic middle-distance runner (1996); COVID-19.
- 23 January – Jonas Mosa Gwangwa, 83, jazz musician.
- 24 January – Joseph Sonnabend, 88, physician and HIV/AIDS researcher (How to Have Sex in an Epidemic); complications from a heart attack.
- 28 January
  - Sibongile Khumalo, 63, singer.
  - Lewis Wolpert, 91, South African-born British developmental biologist, COVID-19.

=== February ===
- 22 February – Seif Bamporiki, Rwandan opposition politician (Rwanda National Congress, RNC) exiled in Cape Town; shot

=== March ===
- 4 March – Karima Brown, 54, journalist; COVID-19
- 9 March – Cliff Simon, 58, South African-born American actor (Stargate SG-1); kiteboarding accident.
- 12 March – Goodwill Zwelithini kaBhekuzulu, 72, Zulu king; problems related to diabetes
- 12 March – Noxolo Maqashalala, 44, actress; COVID-19
- 13 March – Menzi Ngubane, 56, actor; stroke
- 26 March – Elizabeth Thabethe, 61, politician, MP (since 1994); complications from a traffic collision.
- 28 March – Christof Heyns, 62, human rights lawyer.
- 29 March – Adrian Nel, 40, commercial diver and construction worker; murdered (death reported on this date)
- 30 March – Patrick O. O'Meara, 83, South African-born American educator and author.

=== April ===
- 4 April – Frank Mdlalose, 89, South African political activist, 1st former Premier of KwaZulu-Natal; COVID-19.
- 10 April – Sindisiwe van Zyl, 45, physician and HIV activist; complications from COVID-19.
- 29 April – Mantfombi Shiyiwe Dlamini Zulu, 68, Queen regent of the Zulus.

=== May ===
- 23 May – Emmanuel Mjokes Matsane, South African musician, 54; car accident.
- 31 May – MacDonald Ndodana Mathunjwa, South African actor, 72; COVID-19.

=== June ===
- 7 June – Shaleen Surtie-Richards, 66, actress (Fiela se kind, Egoli: Place of Gold, Supersterre)
- 13 June –
  - Dan Montsitsi, 69, South African politician and former anti-apartheid activist.
  - Khaya Xaba, South African politician, illness.
- 17 June – Jabu Mabuza, 63, South African businessman, COVID-19 related illness.
- 22 June – Luzuko Nteleko, 36, South African actor.

=== July ===
- 1 July –
  - Steve Kekana, 62, South African singer.
  - Mutodi Neshehe, 46, South African actor (b. 1975).
- 9 July -
  - Mayor Geoff Makhubo, Former Mayor of the city of Johannesburg, COVID-19.
- 12 July –
  - Dr. Ben Ngubane, former Premier of KwaZulu-Natal, COVID-19.
  - Nokuzola Mlengana, 59, South African actress.
- 15 July –
  - Ebrahim Desai, 58, South African Mufti.
- 27 July – Sindi Buthelezi, South African actress, 32.
- 30 July – Shona Ferguson, 47, South African actor & film-maker, COVID-19.

=== August ===
- 3 August – Allan Stephenson, 71, British-born South African composer, cellist, and conductor.
- 9 August – Killer Kau, 23, South African musician, car accident.
- 9 August – Mpura, 26, South African musician, car accident
- 31 August – Kebby Maphatsoe, 58, South African politician

=== September ===
- 6 September – Zanele kaMagwaza-Msibi, 59, South African politician, COVID-19.
- 16 September – Hlengiwe Mkhize, 59, South African politician
- 18 September – Jolidee Matongo, 45–46, South African politician, car accident.

=== November ===
- 11 November – Frederik Willem de Klerk, 85, former State President of South Africa (lung cancer).
- 17 November – Theuns Jordaan, 50, South African singer-songwriter (leukemia).

=== December ===
- 2 December – Sir Antony Sher, 72, South African-born British actor (The History Man, Murphy's Law), cancer.
- 6 December
  - Lindiwe Mabuza, 83, South African politician, diplomat, poet, academic, journalist, and cultural activist
  - Ebrahim Ismail Ebrahim, 84, South African anti-apartheid activist
- 8 December – Naledi Welliers, Former House wife of Johannesburg
- 22 December – Thandatha Jongilizwe Mabandla, 95, 1st Chief Minister of Ciskei in 1972–1973
- 23 December – Lilian Diedericks, 96, South African anti-apartheid activist
- 26 December - Desmond Tutu, 90, South African Anglican Bishop, anti-apartheid activist

== See also ==
=== Country overviews ===
- History of South Africa
- History of modern South Africa
- Outline of South Africa
- Government of South Africa
- Politics of South Africa
- National Council of Provinces (NCOP)
- National Assembly of South Africa
- Timeline of South Africa history

=== Related timelines for current period ===
- 2020s
- 2020s in political history
- COVID-19 pandemic in Africa
- COVID-19 pandemic in South Africa
- COVID-19 vaccination in South Africa
- 2020–21 South-West Indian Ocean cyclone season
- 2021–22 South-West Indian Ocean cyclone season
