= Sam Phillips =

Sam Phillips may refer to:

- Sam Phillips (record producer) (1923–2003), American record producer, rock-and-roll promoter and founder of Sun Records
- Sam Phillips (model) (born 1966), American glamour model and disc jockey
- Sam Phillips (musician, born 1962), American female singer-songwriter who also recorded using the name "Leslie Phillips"
- Sam Phillips (sailor) (born 1991), Australian sport sailor
- Sam Phillips (English actor) (born 1984), English actor and writer
- Sam Phillips (South African actor) (1948–2021)
- Sam Phillips (Yup'ik) (c. 1893–1974), Yup'ik community leader
- Sam Phillips, English badminton player in the 2013 London Grand Prix Gold
- Sam Phillips, a fictional character in the British TV series, Moving Wallpaper

== See also ==
- Samuel Phillips (disambiguation)
