= Tribert Rujugiro Ayabatwa =

Rwandan businessman (c.1941 - 2024)

- Born: Tribert Rujugiro Ayabatwa c.1941 Nyanza, Rwanda
- Died: 16 April 2024 (aged 82–83); Dubai, United Arab Emirates
- Burial place: South Africa
- Citizenship: Rwandan
- Occupation: Businessman
- Years active: 1970 - retired in 2013
- Title: Founder of the Pan African Tobacco Group
- Spouse: Nathalie Mukagatete (died October 2023)
- Children: Paul Nkwaya; Richard Rujugiro
- Relatives: Serge Huggenberger (son-in-law)

Tribert Rujugiro Ayabatwa (c. 1941 – 16 April 2024) was a Rwandan entrepreneur, best known as the founder of the Pan African Tobacco Group, the largest tobacco company in Africa.

In his later years Ayabatwa fell out with Rwandan President Paul Kagame and left the country. Kagame accused him of funding rebel groups and of economic crimes, and tried to get him extradited from Uganda, leading to a rift between the two countries. The government seized and sold his property in Rwanda. Ayabatwa died in April 2024 in Dubai, United Arab Emirates.

== Early years (c. 1941–1960) ==
Tribert Rujugiro Ayabatwa was born in Nyanza, in the Southern Province of Rwanda, in the early 1940s. (Note: In a 2019 telephone interview with New Vision of Uganda, Ayabatwa said he had been told that he was born in the early 1940s. Different sources give his age when he died in 2024 as 82 or 83. Based on this, he would have been born around 1941.) He was a Tutsi. His family was relatively poor. Ayabatwa (Note: Tribert Rujugiro Ayabatwa's Christian name was Tribert, and his middle name was Rufugiro. His father's name was Ayabatwa. However, sources often refer to him as Rujugiro.) said that his home was near the palace of King Mutara III Rudahigwa, and he and many other children would be invited to the palace to entertain the king. His mother died when he was 12 years old. When he was 16, in the eighth grade, he was expelled from school. He blamed the colonial administration for this, saying they favored Hutus over Tutsis.

== Burundi (c. 1960–1990) ==
When he was 19 Ayabatwa moved to Burundi to escape the political upheavals in Rwanda. He got work at the Post Office in Burundi as a clerk and typist. In his three years working there he learned French. Although he had supportative supervisors and did well, he did not see a future in the Post Office since the newly independent country favoured Burundians to Rwandan immigrants.

He then took work with a petroleum storage company, followed by unsuccessful attempts to earn money as a baker and a gold trader. When he was 29 he started to import wheat, flour, salt and cigarettes from Tanzania, and succeeded in maintaining imports despite violence along the Tanzanian border. By 1974 cigarettes were becoming his main import. In 1978 Ayabatwa decided to use his profits to manufacture cigarettes in Burundi rather than importing them. In the 1980s the Burundi Tobacco Company (BTC) started to clear large areas of forest in Kirundo Province to supply wood to the ovens used to dry tobacco, but did not undertake reforestation. He next founded an enterprise in neighboring Zaire, now the Democratic Republic of Congo. These became the basis for the Pan African Tobacco Group (PTG).

In 1987 President Pierre Buyoya ovethrew Colonel Jean-Baptiste Bagaza and Ayabatwa was imprisoned in Bujumbura. He was charged with aiding the previous government, and his businesses were nationalized. He escaped from prison in 1990 and fled to South Africa. His family followed him to South Africa, where he set up his corporate headquarters. Later the government of Burundi restored his property, intact.

== Rwanda (c. 1995–2010) ==
In 1995 Ayabatwa returned to Rwanda, where he lived for 15 years. He became economic advisor to the President Kagame, and assisted in the finances of the Rwandan Patriotic Front party. He helped establish the Rwandan Chamber of Commerce, and was its first chairman. He was chairman of the Rwanda Investment and Export Promotion Agency, and was co-chairman of a task force that spearheaded many economic reforms in Rwanda.

The Pan African Tobacco Group (PTG), which manufactures Supermatch cigarettes, expanded until it was manufacturing and operating in Angola, Burundi, the Democratic Republic of the Congo, Nigeria, South Sudan, Tanzania, and Uganda. Ayabatwa bought large areas of land in the northwestern West Nile sub-region of Uganda, where his Meridian Tobacco Company's subsidiary, the Leaf Tobacco Company, employed thousands of people growing tobacco. PTG became the largest tobacco company in Africa. As of 2013 the PTG subsidiaries included Leaf Tobacco & Commodities (U) in Uganda, Vision Tobacco in Dubai, Barco Trading in Angola, Burundi Tobacco Company in Burundi, Leaf Tobacco & Commodities in Nigeria, the Congo Tobacco Company, Mastermind Tobacco Company in Tanzania and Arkan Leaf in Angola.

Ayabatwa's Kigali Investment Company (KIC) owned the Union Trade Center (UTC), a mall in Kigali that opened in 2006. It held 81 shops, restaurants and other businesses. Ayabatwa owned 97% of the property. Ayabatwa founded the Burundi Cement Company around 2008, the only cement manufacturer in Burundi. An agreement signed on 3 April 2008 gave the company tax and customs advantages. The factory was built on land in Cibitoke that had housed the Burundi Tobacco Company.

In 2008 a United Nations security report said he was one of the people funding the war in the east of the Democratic Republic of Congo. This was later found to be incorrect and the case was closed. Before leaving Rwanda in 2010, Ayabatwa was fighting charges of tax evasion in South Africa and the United Kingdom. He is said to have asked the Rwandan government to protect him in these cases, but was refused. In 2008 he was arrested in the United Kingdom for tax fraud in South Africa, and pleaded guilty.

== Last years (2010–2024) ==
After leaving Rwanda in 2010, Ayabatwa divided his time between South Africa and Dubai. After his departure the Rwandan authorities accused him of financing rebel groups who wanted to overthrow Kagame, and with tax evasion and other crimes. From exile, he spoke in favour of Rwandan opposition groups such as the Rwanda National Congress (RNC). The Rwandans linked him to General Kayumba Nyamwasa and the former Rwandan head of intelligence, Colonel Patrick Karegeya, both of whom were exiled in South Africa. In 2011 the Rwandan police seized eight heavy trucks owned by the PTC's subsidiary of the eastern DRC, the Congo Tobacco Company. They claimed that the trucks were being used for "terror activities" organized by Nyamwasa and Karegeya.

By 2013 Ayabatwa was head of a group of seven companies that employed 26,000 people making cement, tea, plastic shoes, beer, snack foods and cigarettes. The PTG was operating in ten countries and trading in 27 African and Middle Eastern countries, with annual revenues in excess of $250 million. Ayabatwa had homes in South Africa and Dubai. In January 2013 he relinquished operational control of the Pan African Tobacco Group to his son, Paul Nkwaya Ayabatwa. He remained chairman of Pan African Tobacco. He was featured in a Forbes Magazine article in 2014, which called him the richest tobacco manufacturer and trader in Africa. He set up the Tribert Rujugiro Ayabatwa Foundation (TRA), a charity, which funds youth training.

In 2017 authorities in Rwanda declared Ayabatwa's assets in the country were "abandoned properties", which allowed them to be auctioned or taken over. That year, the government sold the Union Trade Center (UTC) mall for $6.8 million. Ayabatwa told the East African Court of Justice that the property was worth $20 million. The court agreed the takeover and auction were illegal. The EACJ awarded him $1 million in damages in August 2022.

Rwanda tried to persuade the Ugandan government to close the PTG's Meridian Tobacco Company subsidiary, which had operations in Arua, Uganda. In 2018 Ayabatwa met with Ugandan President Yoweri Museveni. He said that Museveni tried to convince him to sell his businesses in Uganda to reduce tensions with Rwanda, but not to feel pressured. Rukugiro said that he would try to find a buyer, but had not succeeded before he died. Uganda refused to extradite Ayabatwa to Rwanda, which is said to have contributed to the breakdown in diplomatic relations between the two countries that lasted from February 2019 to January 2022.

The Counter Extremism Project (CEP) is a reputable organization with offices in Germany, New York and London. In 2021 it published a report on efforts in East Africa to fight extremism, crime, corruption, and illegal trade. The report said Ayabatwa played a central role in the illegal trade in tobacco in the region, and the trade funded extremist groups. The CEP report repeated the UN Group of Experts 2008 allegation, but not the dismissal of the charges.

Ayabatwa died on 16 April 2024 in Dubai, United Arab Emirates. His family said he was watching a movie with a grandson at his home after dinner when he died.

== Sources ==
- Bishumba, Richard (17 April 2024), "Exiled Rwandan industrialist Tribert Rujugiro dies at 82", The New Times Rwanda
- Canary Mugume (17 April 2024), "Tribert Rujugiro: Exiled Rwandan accused of terrorism financing is dead", Nile Post
- D'Sassa, Equiano (17 April 2024), "The Formidable Life And Death Of Tribert Rujugiro Ayabatwa, The Charitable Tycoon", African Gazette
- "How Sars bust Lifman", News24, 12 April 2015
- "I cannot fight Kagame, says Rujugiro", New Vision (Uganda), 18 March 2019
- Kagire, Edmund (17 April 2024), "Who Was Tribert Ayabatwa Rujugiro? Rwandan Tycoon Passes On Aged 83", KT Press
- Kim Aine (17 April 2024), "Rwandan Tobacco Billionaire Tribert Rujugiro Ayabatwa is Dead", Chimpreports
- Mfonobong Nsehe (1 January 2014), "Meet The Richest Tobacco Man In Africa, Tribert Rujugiro Ayabatwa", Forbes Magazine
- Mfonobong Nsehe (4 August 2021), Tribert Rujugiro Ayabatwa's Business and Philanthropic Legacy Will Outlive His Detractors
- Misago, Jeremie (1 March 2021), "BUCECO : le calvaire de la population environnante de l'entreprise", Iwacu (in French)
- Naturinda, Nelson (20 April 2024), "Rwandan tycoon Tribert Rujugiro Ayabatwa at centre of 2019 border closure dies", The East African Times
- Nisubire, Jean Claude (7 January 2022), "Le ministère en charge du commerce refuse la revue à la hausse du prix de ciment", Le Renouveau (in French)
- "Pan African Tobacco Group founder to retire", Tobacco Reporter, 7 January 2013
- "Récoltes : Kirundo aux anges, mais …", IWACU (in French), 5 May 2013
- Tribert Rujugiro Ayabatwa: Record Production at Burundi Cement, Burundi Cement Company, 15 March 2013
