= Pan African Tobacco Group =

African cigarette manufacturer

- Type: Tobacco products production and distribution
- Founded: 1979
- Founder: Tribert Rujugiro Ayabatwa
- Headquarters: Dubai
- Website: www.ptg-hld.com

The Pan African Tobacco Group (PTG) is a multinational tobacco company operating in Africa and the Near East.

== Subsidiaries ==
As of 2024 PTG reported that it was manufacturing in Angola, Burundi, Democratic Republic of the Congo, Nigeria, South Sudan, Tanzania and Uganda.

| Country | Subsidiary |
|---|---|
| Angola | Barco Trading |
| Burundi | Burundi Tobacco Company |
| DR Congo | Congo Tobacco Company |
| Nigeria | Leaf Tobacco & Commodities (N) Ltd. |
| South Sudan | Carnak South Sudan |
| Tanzania | Mastermind Tobacco Tanzania Ltd. |
| Uganda | Leaf Tobacco & Commodities (U) Ltd. |

== Origins ==
Around 1970 the group's Rwandan founder, Tribert Rujugiro Ayabatwa (c. 1941 – 2024), started to import wheat, flour, salt and cigarettes into Burundi from Tanzania. By 1974 cigarettes were becoming his main import. In 1978 he decided to use his profits to manufacture cigarettes in Burundi rather than importing them. In the 1980s the Burundi Tobacco Company (BTC) started to clear large areas of forest in Kirundo Province to supply wood to the ovens used to dry tobacco, but did not undertake reforestation. Ayabatwa next founded an enterprise in neighboring Zaire, now the Democratic Republic of Congo. These became the basis for the Pan African Tobacco Group (PTG).

== History ==
In 1987 Ayabatwa was imprisoned in Bujumbura. He was charged with aiding the previous government, and his businesses were nationalized. He escaped from prison in 1990 and fled to South Africa. Later the government of Burundi restored his property, intact. Ayabatwa bought large areas of land in the northwestern West Nile sub-region of Uganda, where his Meridian Tobacco Company's subsidiary, the Leaf Tobacco Company, employed thousands of people growing tobacco.

The Barco Trading Company (BTC) was established in 2002 in Lubango, Angola. It is the only Angolan company that manufactures tobacco products. As of 2020 $60 million had been invested in the company, which had 416 full-time employees and seasonal workers.

In 2011 the Rwandan police seized eight heavy trucks owned by the PTC's subsidiary of the eastern DRC, the Congo Tobacco Company. They claimed that the trucks were being used for "terror activities" organized by former general Kayumba Nyamwasa and former Rwandan head of intelligence, Colonel Patrick Karegeya.

PTG became the largest tobacco company in Africa. By 2013 the PTG was trading in 27 African and Middle Eastern countries, with annual revenues in excess of $250 million. The company was manufacturing cigarettes in nine African countries and had more than 20,000 employees. As of 2013 the PTG subsidiaries included Leaf Tobacco & Commodities in Uganda, Vision Tobacco in Dubai, Barco Trading in Angola, Burundi Tobacco Company in Burundi, Leaf Tobacco & Commodities in Nigeria, the Congo Tobacco Company, Mastermind Tobacco Company in Tanzania and Arkan Leaf in Angola.

In January 2013 Ayabatwa relinquished operational control of the Pan African Tobacco Group to his son, Paul Nkwaya Ayabatwa. He remained chairman of Pan African Tobacco. Ayabatwa died on 16 April 2024 in Dubai, United Arab Emirates.

== Sources ==
- Bishumba, Richard (17 April 2024), "Exiled Rwandan industrialist Tribert Rujugiro dies at 82", The New Times Rwanda
- D'Sassa, Equiano (17 April 2024), "The Formidable Life And Death Of Tribert Rujugiro Ayabatwa, The Charitable Tycoon", African Gazette
- "I cannot fight Kagama, says Rujugiro", New Vision (Uganda), 18 March 2019
- Kim Aine (17 April 2024), "Rwandan Tobacco Billionaire Tribert Rujugiro Ayabatwa is Dead", Chimpreports
- Mfonobong Nsehe (1 January 2014), "Meet The Richest Tobacco Man In Africa, Tribert Rujugiro Ayabatwa", Forbes Magazine
- Mfonobong Nsehe (4 August 2021), Tribert Rujugiro Ayabatwa’s Business and Philanthropic Legacy Will Outlive His Detractors
- Naturinda, Nelson (20 April 2024), "Rwandan tycoon Tribert Rujugiro Ayabatwa at centre of 2019 border closure dies", The East African Times
- Our Group of Companies, PTG
- "Pan African Tobacco Group founder to retire", Tobacco Reporter, 7 January 2013
- "Récoltes : Kirundo aux anges, mais …", IWACU (in French), 5 May 2013
- "Tribert Rujugiro Ayabatwa's Angola-Based BTC Approaching a 20-Year Mark of Productive Corporate Citizenship", Yahoo! Finance, 18 September 2020
