= Fred Rwigyema =

Rwandan military officer and politician (1957–1990)

Fred Gisa Rwigema

Personal details
- Born: 10 April 1957 Gitarama, Ruanda-Urundi (present-day Rwanda)
- Died: 2 October 1990 (aged 33) Matimba Hill, Rwanda
- Cause of death: Gunshot wound
- Resting place: Remera Heroes Cemetery, Kigali
- Spouse: Jeannette Rwigema
- Children: Eric Gisa Rwigema; Teta Gisa Rwigema

Military service
- Allegiance: Front for National Salvation; FRELIMO; Uganda National Liberation Army; National Resistance Army; Rwandan Patriotic Front
- Years of service: 1976–1990
- Rank: Major General
- Battles/wars: Uganda–Tanzania War; Ugandan Bush War; War in Uganda (1986–1994); Rwandan Civil War †

Fred Gisa Rwigema (also sometimes spelled Rwigyema; born Emmanuel Gisa; 10 April 1957 – 2 October 1990) was a Rwandan military officer and revolutionary. He was the founder of the Rwandan Patriotic Front (RPF), a political and rebel group formed by Rwandan Tutsi exile descendants of those forced to leave the country after the 1959 Hutu Revolution.

== Early life and rise in Uganda ==
Rwigema was born in Gitarama, in southern Rwanda. Considered a Tutsi, in 1960 he and his family fled to Uganda and settled in a refugee camp in Nshungerezi, Ankole following the Rwandan Revolution of 1959 and the ousting of King Kigeli V.

After finishing high school in 1976, he went to Tanzania and joined the Front for National Salvation (FRONASA), a rebel group headed by Yoweri Museveni, the brother of his friend Salim Saleh. It was at this point that he began calling himself Fred Rwigema. Later that year, he traveled to Mozambique and joined the FRELIMO rebels who were fighting for the liberation of Mozambique from Portugal's colonial rule.

In 1979, he joined the Uganda National Liberation Army (UNLA), which together with Tanzanian armed forces captured Kampala in April 1979, forcing Idi Amin to flee into exile.

He later joined Museveni's National Resistance Army (NRA), which fought a guerrilla war called the Ugandan Bush War against the government of Milton Obote. It was here that Rwigema first fought alongside a number of future RPF leaders including future Rwandan president Paul Kagame, James Kabarebe, Patrick Karegeya and Kayumba Nyamwasa.

After the NRA captured state power in 1986, Rwigema became the deputy Minister of Defence. He was regularly at the front line in northern Uganda during the new government's operations against remnants of the ousted regime as well as other rebel groups.

== Leadership ==
Fred Rwigema was amongst the initial 27 armed individuals, led by Uganda's President Yoweri Museveni, who took to the bush in 1981 to begin a guerilla war following Uganda's contentious Presidential elections of 1980, where Apollo Milton Obote's party the Uganda People's Congress was accused of engineering an election fraud to get victory over the Democratic Party which was led by Paul Kawanga Ssemwogerere and Uganda Patriotic Movement, which was led by Yoweri Museveni.

By 1985, Fred Rwigema had emerged as one of the most significant military leaders so much so that when the National Resistance Army (NRA) secured a military victory against a military government that had staged a successful coup d’état against Milton Obote's regime, Fred Rwigyema was one of the three former rebel leaders who were commissioned as General Officers in the NRA. He was commissioned a Major General alongside Yoweri Museveni's brother Salim Saleh Akandwanaho and Elly Tumwine. Yoweri Museveni himself was made a Lieutenant General.

Fred Rwigema was a charismatic military leader, who was loved by all soldiers and officers who served under him. He especially earned his reputation in counter insurgency operations in Northern Uganda, where the army defeated by the National Resistance Army was holding out. Fred Rwigyema also stands out in his contemporaries for not being involved in any war crimes while he was directing operations in Northern and North Eastern Uganda. That earned the nickname “Mungu wa vita”, Swahili for “god of war”.

He was appointed Deputy Minister for Defense following the capture of power by the National Resistance Movement, but that did not take him away from directing military operations in Northern Uganda.

== Rwandan Civil War and death ==
On 1 October 1990, Rwigyema led the splinter group of 10,000 NRA troops in an invasion of northern Rwanda.This event started the Rwandan Civil War. What became the RPF chose this date as it was close to Ugandan independence day on 9 October. This served as an opportunity for Rwigyema, as the movement could be disguised from the main NRA as a military parade.

On the second day of the civil war, Rwigyema was shot in the head and died at Nyabwenshogozi Hill. His death was kept secret for a month so as not to harm morale. There is a dispute about the exact circumstances of Rwigyema's death; the official line of Kagame's government was that Rwigyema was killed by a stray bullet. However, historian Gérard Prunier states that he had established "from incontrovertible evidence (including an interview with an eyewitness to the killing)" that Rwigyema was killed by his subcommander Peter Bayingana, following an argument over tactics, and excused his readers for having accepted the "cooked version of facts [the RPF] provided" him with.

Rwigyema is considered one of Rwanda's national heroes. His body was buried at the Remera Heroes Cemetery in Kigali.
