= Rwanda–United States relations =

- Rwanda: United States

Rwanda–United States relations are bilateral relations between Rwanda and the United States.

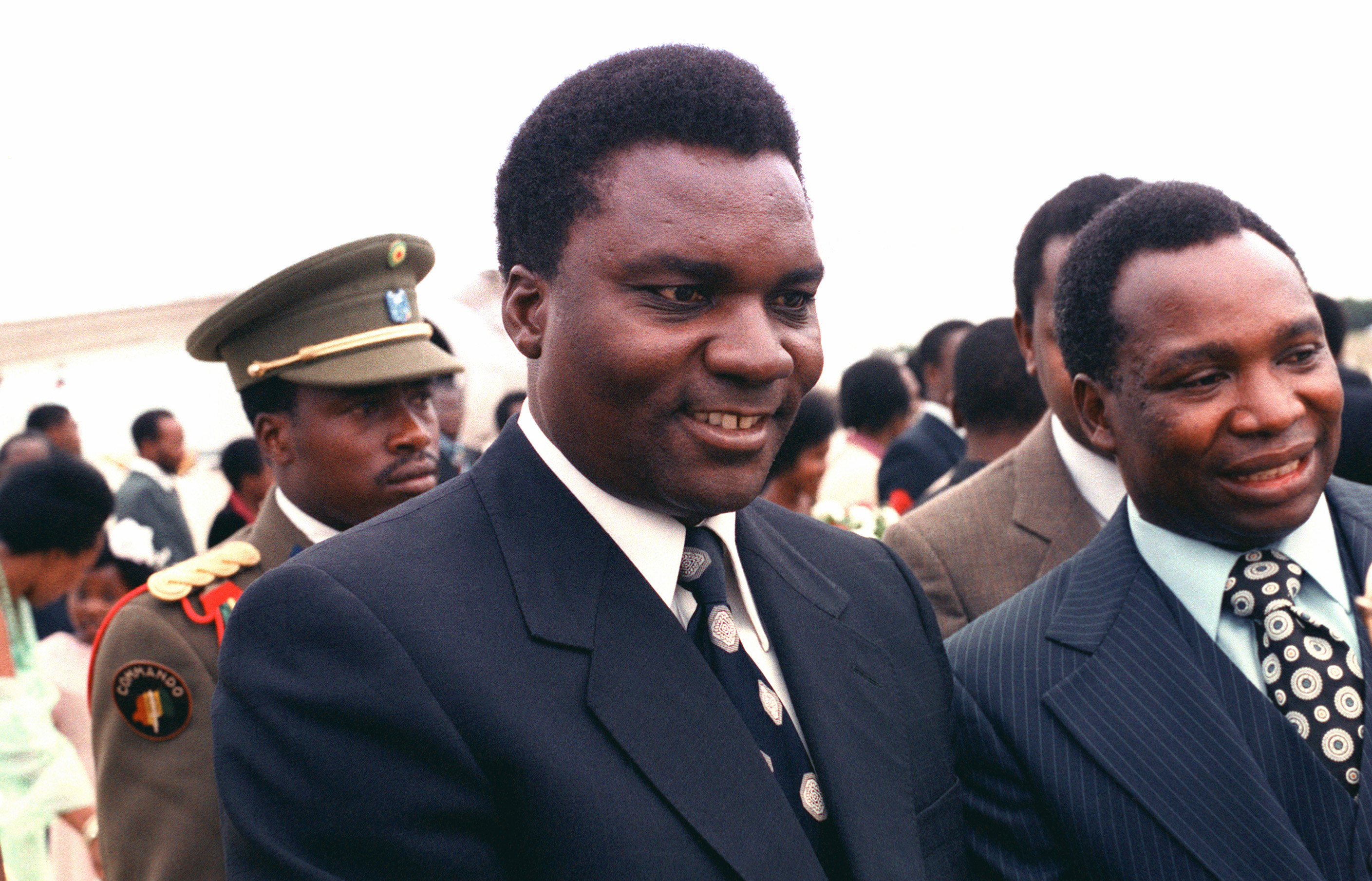
Rwandan President Juvénal Habyarimana at Andrews Air Force Base in Maryland during his visit to the United States in 1980

According to the 2012 U.S. Global Leadership Report, 76% of Rwandans approve of U.S. leadership, with 17% disapproving and 7% uncertain.

== History ==
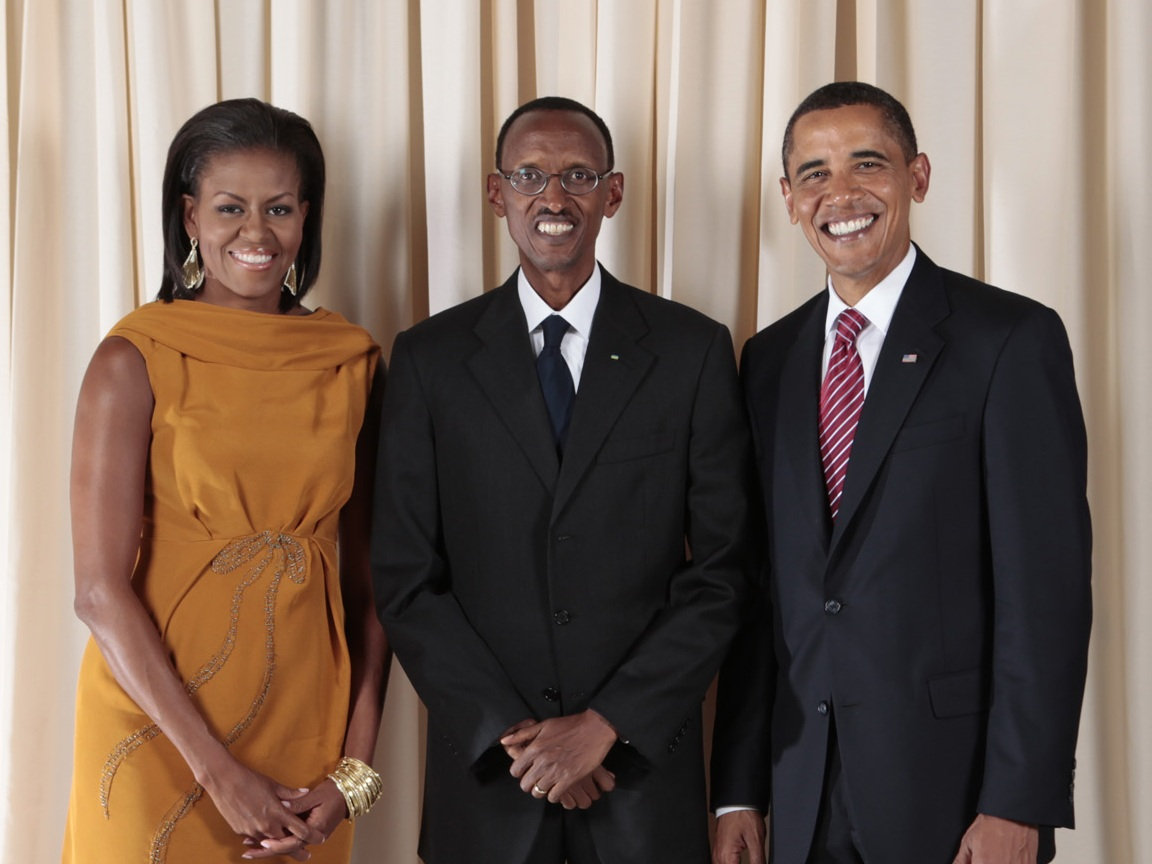
Rwandan President Paul Kagame (center) with United States President Barack Obama and First Lady Michelle Obama in 2009

U.S. Government interests have shifted significantly since the 1994 genocide from a strictly humanitarian concern focusing on stability and security to a strong partnership with the Government of Rwanda focusing on sustainable development. The largest U.S. Government programs are the President's Emergency Plan for AIDS Relief (PEPFAR) and the President's Malaria Initiative, which aim to reduce the impact of these debilitating diseases in Rwanda. Other activities promote rural economic growth and support good governance and decentralization. Overall U.S. foreign assistance to Rwanda has increased fourfold over the past four years.

In July 2013, the US warned Rwanda to immediately end its support for the March 23 Movement rebels in the Democratic Republic of the Congo, after evidence was found that Rwandan military officials were involved.

In November 2015, the US criticized a vote by Rwandan lawmakers to approve a change to their constitution to allow President Paul Kagame to serve a third term. A State Department spokesman did not explicitly threaten that US aid to its traditionally close African friend would be cut, but warned ties could be reviewed.

In 2025, the United States served as a mediator in talks that led to a peace agreement between Rwanda and the Democratic Republic of the Congo (DRC). In early March 2026, the United States sanctioned the Rwandan Defence Force and four of its senior commanders on the grounds they had perpetuated the conflict in the DRC. In response, the Rwandan government denounced the sanctions as unfair and said they "misrepresent the reality and distort the facts of the conflict."

In April 2025, Rwanda accepted an Iraqi refugee who was deported from the United States. Neither party released details about this incident. Soon after, in May 2025, Rwanda started official negotiations with the United States to receive more deportees. This came shortly after the Trump administration started to crackdown on illegal immigration and to close down refugee programs. In August 2025, Rwanda agreed to receive up to 250 vetted deportees from the United States. On the same month, the United States government sent a group of 7 deportees to Rwanda. The Rwandan Ministry of Foreign Affairs and International Cooperation spokeswoman made an official announcement, explaining the deportees who chose to stay in the country would receive support and protection from the Rwandan government.

== Economic and aid relations ==
A major focus of bilateral relations is the U.S. Agency for International Development's (USAID) program. In support of the overall Government of Rwanda development plan, USAID aims to improve the health and livelihoods of Rwandans and increase economic and political development. To achieve this, USAID activities focus on:

- Prevention, treatment and care of HIV/AIDS;
- Reducing mortality and morbidity due to malaria;
- Increasing access to, and use of, voluntary family planning methods;
- Improving maternal and child health;
- Promoting rural economic growth through specialty coffee, dairy, and eco-tourism;
- Encouraging participatory governance and decentralization in 12 target districts;
- Promoting a democratic Rwanda, where the government respects human rights, civil liberties, and the rule of law; and
- Providing food aid to the most vulnerable populations.

The Mission is currently implementing a number of activities related to the goals above, and is working closely with the Millennium Challenge Corporation (MCC) to obtain approval of the Threshold Country Plan submitted by the Government of Rwanda in November 2007. Once approved, the plan will be implemented by USAID and will focus on strengthening the justice sector and civic participation, and promoting civil rights and liberties.

American business interests have been small; currently, private U.S. investment is limited to the tea industry, franchising (FedEx, Coca-Cola, Western Union, and MoneyGram) and small holdings in service and manufacturing concerns. Annual U.S. exports to Rwanda, under $10 million annually from 1990 to 1993, exceeded $40 million in 1994 and 1995. Although exports decreased in the years immediately after the genocide, in 2007 they were estimated at approximately $17 million, a 20% increase over 2006.

In December 2025, Rwanda signed an agreement with the United States over health care assistance. The United States agreed to provide up to $158 million in aid over the next five years. In return, Rwanda must invest $70 million into its own health care system in this same time period. This deal was part of a larger effort by the Trump administration to procure bilateral aid agreements that differ from the multilateral approach taken by the World Health Organization and differ from traditional USAID delivery methods. The United States has signed similar deals with 16 other African countries as of March 2026.

In November 2026, the Trump administration removed Rwanda from the preferential trade program created by the African Growth and Opportunity Act.

== Diplomatic missions ==
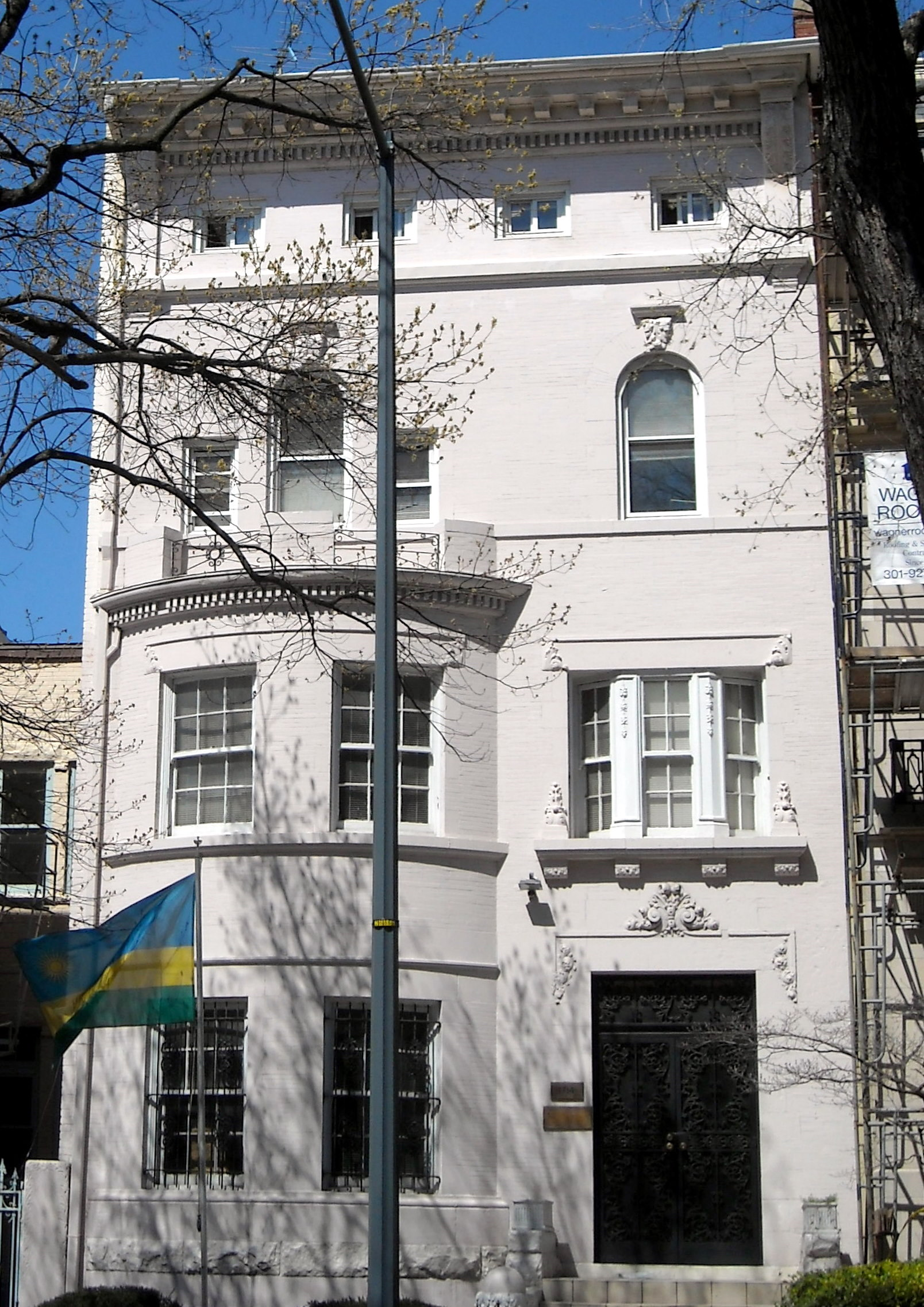
Embassy of Rwanda in Washington, D.C.

The Embassy of Rwanda in Washington, D.C. is Rwanda's diplomatic mission to the United States of America. It is also accredited to Argentina, Brazil, and Mexico. The embassy is located in Italianate row house at 1714 New Hampshire Avenue NW in the Dupont Circle neighborhood. The current Rwandan ambassador to the United States is Mathilde Mukantabana.

The American Embassy in Kigali was established on July 1, 1962, coinciding with Rwanda's day of independence. The first head of the embassy was David J.S. Manbey, serving as Chargé d'Affaires ad interim. The State Department's Public Affairs section maintains a cultural center in Kigali, which offers public access to English-language publications and information on the United States.

== See also ==
- Foreign relations of Rwanda
- Foreign relations of the United States
