= List of ambassadors of Rwanda to the United States =

Coordinates: 38.915819°N 77.045822°W

Ambassador of Rwanda to the United States
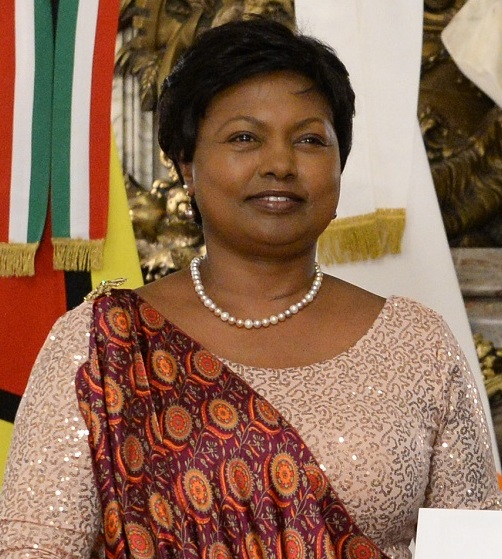
- Incumbent; Mathilde Mukantabana since July 18, 2013
- Inaugural holder: Lazare Mpakaniye
- Formation: February 14, 1963

The Rwandan Ambassador to the United States is the official representative of the Government of Rwanda to the Government of the United States and is head of the Embassy of Rwanda in Washington, D.C.

== List of representatives ==
Diplomatic agreement / designated	Diplomatic accreditation	Ambassador	Observations	List of presidents of Rwanda	List of presidents of the United States	Term end
February 5, 1963	February 14, 1963	Lazare Mpakaniye		Grégoire Kayibanda	Lyndon B. Johnson	
March 31, 1964	May 6, 1964	Celestin Kabanda		Grégoire Kayibanda	Lyndon B. Johnson	
August 29, 1969	October 2, 1969	Fidele Nkundabagenzi		Grégoire Kayibanda	Richard Nixon	
March 12, 1974	March 13, 1974	Joseph Nizeyimana		Juvénal Habyarimana	Gerald Ford	
September 1, 1976	November 18, 1976	Bonaventure Ubalijoro		Juvénal Habyarimana	Gerald Ford	
November 2, 1982	November 22, 1982	Simon Insonere		Juvénal Habyarimana	Ronald Reagan	
October 5, 1987	October 20, 1987	Aloys Uwimana		Juvénal Habyarimana	Ronald Reagan	
March 16, 1996	April 30, 1996	Theogene Rudashingwa		Pasteur Bizimungu	Bill Clinton	
May 18, 1999	August 10, 1999	Richard Sezibera		Pasteur Bizimungu	Bill Clinton	
April 18, 2003	May 8, 2003	Zac Nsenga		Paul Kagame	George W. Bush	
May 18, 2007	July 25, 2007	James Kimonyo		Paul Kagame	George W. Bush	
July 5, 2013	July 18, 2013	Mathilde Mukantabana		Paul Kagame	Barack Obama	
