= Jean Bosco Kazura =

Rwandan general

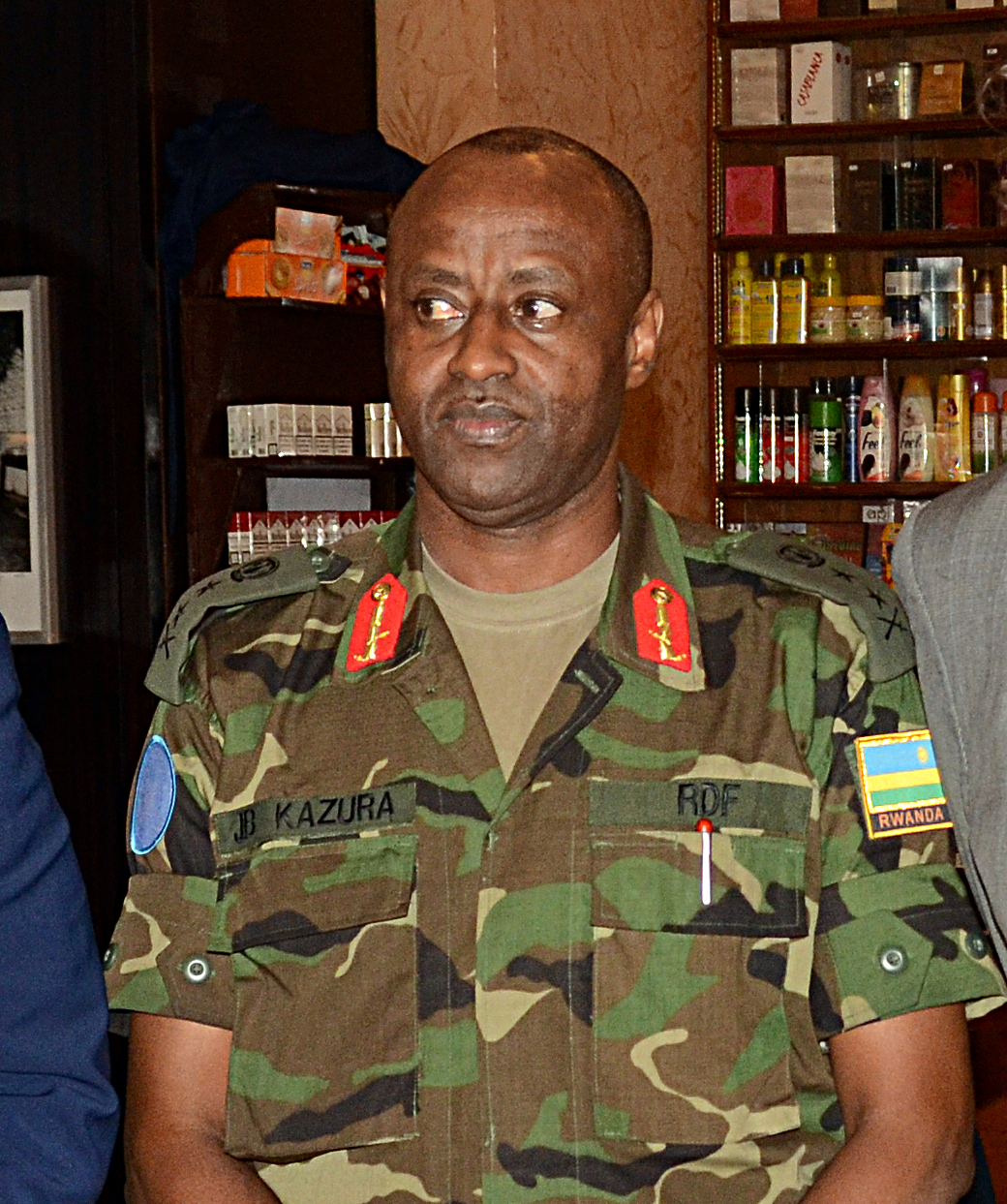

Jean Bosco Kazura is a Rwandan General, former Chief of Defence Staff of the Rwanda Defence Force and former head of the Rwandan Football Federation.

Kazura was born and educated in Burundi. He got involved in the military campaign conducted by the Rwandan Patriotic Front to end the 1994 genocide against the Tutsi. Later, he served as the deputy commander of the African Union peacekeeping force in the Darfur region of Sudan. He held various positions in the Rwandan military, including the Principal Staff Officer at the Rwandan Defence Force Headquarters in Kigali (2010-2013), brigade and division level commands (1998-2003), as well as the Deputy Force Commander and the Chief Military Observer of the African Mission in Sudan.

Kazura was the unanimously elected president of the Rwandese Association Football Federation in February 2006. During his first term, Rwanda successfully hosted the 2009 African Youth Championship. Four years later, he was unopposed in an election for FERWAFA president, retaining the position.

After a command reshuffle in April 2010, Kazura was given command of Rwandan army training and operations. In June 2010, he traveled to South Africa to attend the World Cup. He had failed to obtain permission for the trip, required for the army officers leaving the country; hence, he was later recalled and arrested. An army spokesman denied that the arrest had any connection with Kazura's contacting two former military officers living in exile in South Africa, former chief of staff Lieutenant General Faustin Kayumba Nyamwasa and former head of external military intelligence Patrick Karegeya. Kazura spent over a month in detention before being pardoned and released after making an apology.

Kazura resigned as head of FERWAFA in September 2011.

In June 2013, Major General Kazura was appointed as Force Commander of MINUSMA (United Nations Multidimensional Integrated Stabilization Mission in Mali).
