= Gahima =

Gahima may refer to:

- Kanyarwanda I Gahima I, a King of Rwanda
- Gerald Gahima, a judge with the War Crimes Chamber of the Court of Bosnia-Herzegovina
- Yuhi wa II Gahima II, Mwami of the Kingdom of Rwanda during the fifteenth century
- Manasseh Gahima, Rwandan Anglican bishop
