= Burundi Cement Company =

Cement manufacturer in Cibitoke, Burundi

- Trade name: BUCECO
- Industry: Cement
- Founded: 2008; 18 years ago
- Headquarters: Bujumbura, Burundi
- Burundi Cement Company Factory in Cibitoke (Burundi)

The Burundi Cement Company, or BUCECO, is a cement manufacturer in Cibitoke, Burundi. It was founded in 2008 and began production in 2011 as the only cement company in the country.

== History ==
The Burundi Cement Company was founded by Tribert Rujugiro Ayabatwa. An agreement signed on 3 April 2008 gave the company tax and customs advantages. It began production in January 2011, the only cement company in Burundi. It produced 34,500 tons of cement in 2011 and 70,500 tons in 2012. By 2013, it employed 80 people, and the factory was expected to reach its current capacity of 100,000 tons later in the year. The company was already looking at starting a new plant.

The tax and customs agreement was amended on 23 May 2016 and on 21 January 2020. In September 2020, the Minister of Commerce made a surprise visit to the BUCECO plant. In November 2020, it was reported that the official price of a 50 kilograms (110 lb) bag of 32.5 cement was 24,500 BIF, but the actual price was 30,000 BIF at some points of sale in different provinces. The ministry warned cement traders that sanctions would be placed on them if they charged above the official price.

In January 2022, the Ministry of Commerce asked Buceco to suspend its unilateral increase in the price of its products. The company should consult with the Ministry of Commerce and base the revised price on production cost, profit margin and production capacity. In August 2022, the Burundi government said they were preparing to allow import of cement and sugar to keep prices down. Burundi Cement Company asked for a price review before imports were allowed. It said the prices should be allowed to rise to cover higher costs for raw materials and transport.

In October 2022, Burundi Breweries (BRARUDI) and Burundi Cement Company (BUCECO) announced prices increases that they blamed on rising costs of raw materials and energy. The Observatory for the Fight against Corruption and Economic Malpractice (OLUCOME) issued a statement that "This general increase in the prices of essential products for Burundians is very worrying. The government of Burundi is called to act quickly because the tendency shows that all domestic products will follow suit." In August 2023, there was another rise in the price of cement, from 28,500 to 38,000 BIF for a bag of 32.5R cement.

The factory was built on land in Cibitoke that had housed the Burundi Tobacco Company (BTC). It was surrounded by a residential area, and the dust and noise pollution became a health hazard. In February 2020, the authorities suggested that the population must settle elsewhere, away from the factory. In February 2021, Déo Guide Rurema, Minister of the Environment, announced that the factory would be moved. Carême Bizoza, governor of Cibitoke Province, welcomed the announcement.

== See also ==
- List of companies of Burundi
- Economy of Burundi

== Sources ==
- "Burundi government to allow cement imports for a period", Global Cement, 17 August 2022
- Ininahazwe, Liesse (12 November 2020), "Burundi: à quand la stabilité du prix du ciment BUCECO ?", Isanganiro (in French)
- Misago, Jeremie (1 March 2021), "BUCECO : le calvaire de la population environnante de l'entreprise", Iwacu (in French)
- Niciteretse, Joella (18 October 2022), "Burundi Breweries, Cement inflate prices", Burundi Times
- Nisubire, Jean Claude (7 January 2022), "Le ministère en charge du commerce refuse la revue à la hausse du prix de ciment", Le Renouveau (in French)
- Tribert Rujugiro Ayabatwa: Record Production at Burundi Cement, Burundi Cement Company, 15 March 2013
- Tuyubahe, Méchaël (3 August 2023), "Hausse des prix du ciment : Un coup d'épée dans le dos du consommateur", Burundi Eco (in French)
