= Samuel Phillips =

Sam or Samuel Phillips may refer to:

== Military men ==
- Samuel Phillips Lee (1812–1897), American rear admiral during Civil War
- Samuel D. Phillips (1845–1915), American soldier, Medal of Honor recipient
- Samuel C. Phillips (1921–1990), American Air Force general, director of NASA's Apollo program 1964-1969

== Performers ==
- Sam Phillips (South African actor) (1948–2021), performer in Soul City and Jacob's Cross
- Sam Phillips (musician, born 1962), American singer-songwriter, a/k/a Leslie Phillips
- Sam Phillips (model) (born 1966), American presenter, actress and disc jockey
- Sam Phillips (English actor) (born 1984), performer in Hotel Trubble and The Syndicate

== Public officials ==
- Samuel Phillips Jr. (1752–1802), American founder of Phillips Academy in Andover, Massachusetts
- Samuel Pole Phillips (1819–1901), Australian politician and pastoralist
- Samuel F. Phillips (1824–1903), American solicitor general, 1872–1885
- Samuel James Phillips (1855–1920), Australian politician and pastoralist, son of Samuel Pole Phillips
- Crow Village Sam Phillips (c. 1893–1974), Alaskan native Yup'ik community leader

== Sportsmen ==
- Sam Phillips (sailor) (born 1991), Australian Olympic competitor
- Sam Phillips, English badminton player in 2013 London Grand Prix Gold

== Others ==
- Samuel Phillips (minister) (1690–1771), Colonial American Congregationalist
- Samuel Levi Phillips (c.1730-1812), German-British banker and jeweller
- Samuel Phillips (journalist) (1814–1854), English literary critic with The Times
- Sam Phillips (record producer) (1923–2003), American record producer and founder of Sun Records

== Characters ==
- Samantha "Sam" Phillips, script editor in British TV series, Moving Wallpaper
