= Leaf Tobacco & Commodities (U) =

Ugandan cigarette manufacturer

- Type: Tobacco products production and distribution
- Founder: Tribert Rujugiro Ayabatwa
- Headquarters: Uganda
- Products: Supermatch cigarettes
- Owner: Pan African Tobacco Group

Leaf Tobacco & Commodities (U) (LTC) manufactures cigarettes under the Supermatch brand in Uganda. It is a subsidiary of the Pan African Tobacco Group (PTG). The company was founded by Tribert Rujugiro Ayabatwa and is one of the two dominant tobacco companies in Uganda.

== History ==
The Burundi Tobacco Company BTC was founded by in 1979 by Tribert Rujugiro Ayabatwa. He next founded an enterprise in neighboring Zaire, now the Democratic Republic of Congo. These became the basis for the Pan African Tobacco Group (PTG). Ayabatwa bought large areas of land in the northwestern West Nile sub-region of Uganda, where his Meridian Tobacco Company's subsidiary, the Leaf Tobacco Company, employed thousands of people growing tobacco. PTG became the largest tobacco company in Africa. Leaf Tobacco & Commodities (U) is a subsidiary of PTG.

In 1996 BTC let Mastermind Tobacco Uganda Ltd. use its "Supermatch" trademark. In July 2002 BTC discontinued the arrangement on the grounds that Mastermind's cigarettes did not meet BTC's quality requirements. They transferred the trademark to Leaf Tobacco, a new company based in Kireka. The Ugandan commercial court ordered Mastermind to halt production of Supermatch cigarettes until the trademark infringement case had been resolved.

In September 2013 a report on a bill to amend the excise tariff drew on submissions from Leaf Tobacco and Commodities (U) among others. At that time, LTC was the only cigarette manufacturer in Uganda, and employed more than 14,000 people. Companies such as BAT(U) had moved to Kenya, and only exported unprocessed leaf tobacco, paying no export duty. LTC had invested $20 million in Northern Uganda into tobacco manufacturing, to add value before the products were exported. There had been an increase in dumping of cigarettes imported without duty, and cigarettes that were said to be in transit to the Democratic Republic of the Congo or South Sudan ended up being sold in Uganda. There was uncontrolled smuggling of cigarettes branded as "Super match".

In May 2015 the Ugandan Finance Minister, Matia Kasaija, said that local manufacturers that used locally grown tobacco would be taxed at a lower rate than companies that import cigarettes made elsewhere. In 2019 a South Sudan court ruled that Mastermind of Kenya, the parent company of Mastermind Tobacco Uganda, could not export its Supermatch cigarettes to South Sudan in competition with Leaf. The Ugandan position was that they could "escort" Mastermind's cigarettes across Uganda to South Sudan, but it was up to the South Sudan customs to decide whether to admit them.

As of 2023 British American Tobacco and Leaf Tobacco & Commodities dominated the tobacco market in Uganda. Price increases had made cigarettes less affordable, resulting in lower sales for premium brands. Cigarettes sold illicitly had a larger market share than tax-paid cigarettes.

== Sources ==
- Bishumba, Richard (17 April 2024), "Exiled Rwandan industrialist Tribert Rujugiro dies at 82", The New Times Rwanda
- Carmel Rickard (3 April 2019), "Article 2845", AfricanLII
- Jude Etyang (27 October 2002), "Cigarette Firm Told To Cease", New Visiom (Uganda)
- Local tobacco firms to pay less taxes, Monitor, 13 May 2015
- Mfonobong Nsehe (1 January 2014), "Meet The Richest Tobacco Man In Africa, Tribert Rujugiro Ayabatwa", Forbes Magazine
- Mfonobong Nsehe (4 August 2021), Tribert Rujugiro Ayabatwa's Business and Philanthropic Legacy Will Outlive His Detractors
- Naturinda, Nelson (20 April 2024), "Rwandan tycoon Tribert Rujugiro Ayabatwa at centre of 2019 border closure dies", The East African Times
- Okello, Anthony (September 2013), Report of the Committee on Finance, Planning and Economic Development on the Excise Tariff (Amendment) Bill, 2013
- Our Group of Companies, PTG
- Report No. 9686-BU Burundi. Private Sector Development in Agriculture, World Bank Agriculture Operations Division South-Central and Indian Ocean Department Africa Region, 22 January 1993
- Tobacco in Uganda, Euromonitor, July 2023
