= Theogene Rudasingwa =

Rwandan politician (born 1960)

Dr. Theogene Rudasingwa

Ambassador of Rwanda to the United States
- In office 1996–1999

Chief of Staff to the President of Rwanda
- In office 2000–2004

Personal details
- Born: February 2, 1961 (age 65) Kibungo, Rwanda
- Spouse: Dorothy Rudasingwa
- Children: 4
- Education: Makerere University (MD); The Fletcher School of Law and Diplomacy (MA)
- Profession: Physician, diplomat, educator

Military service
- Rank: Major (Rwandese Patriotic Army)

Dr. Theogene Rudasingwa (born 2 February 1961) is a Rwandan physician, diplomat, educator, and political activist. He served as Rwanda’s Ambassador to the United States from 1996 to 1999 and as Chief of Staff to Rwandan President Paul Kagame (2000-2004). During his government service he was also Secretary-General of the ruling Rwandan Patriotic Front (RPF) and participated in the Arusha peace negotiations. Rudasingwa has been in exile in the U.S. since 2004 after falling out with President Kagame, and was recently sentenced to 24 years in jail by a Rwandan court on charges that may have been politically motivated. In 2010, he co-founded the opposition group Rwanda National Congress (RNC) and later led a breakaway faction of the RNC.

Rudasingwa was one of those who gave evidence in 2013 in Spain relating to charges of genocide and war crimes by Rwandan Patriotic Army (RPA) and RPF figures in Rwanda and the Democratic Republic of the Congo between 1994 and 2000. Rudasingwa was himself a Major at the time.

== Early life and education ==
Rudasingwa was born in Kibungo in eastern Rwanda. He grew up in refugee camps across the Great Lakes region during the 1960s and 1970s, after his family fled ethnic violence in Rwanda. he was raised by his mother, Coletta Bamususire, in refugee camps across Burundi, Tanzania, Uganda, and Kenya. He trained as a medical doctor, earning his M.D. from Makerere University in Uganda, and later completed a Master’s degree in international relations at The Fletcher School of Law and Diplomacy at Tufts University.

== Military and diplomatic career ==
=== Rwandese Patriotic Front ===
During the early 1990s civil war in Rwanda, Rudasingwa served in the Rwandese Patriotic Front (RPF) and its armed wing, the Rwandese Patriotic Army (RPA). Initially a battlefield physician, he later became the movement’s Director for Africa, acting as liaison to the United Nations, the Organisation of African Unity, and other African liberation movements. After the RPF took power following the 1994 genocide, he became Secretary-General of the RPF and helped implement the Arusha Peace Process and the new government of national unity.

=== Government service ===
In 1996, Rudasingwa was appointed Ambassador of Rwanda to the United States (and concurrently accredited to Brazil, Mexico, and Argentina). As ambassador, he worked to rebuild Rwanda’s relations with the United States and international institutions in the post-genocide period. After completing his term as ambassador in 1999, he was appointed Chief of Staff to President Paul Kagame, serving from 2000 to 2004. In that role, he coordinated the president’s executive affairs and policy implementation.

== Exile and Opposition ==
By the mid-2000s, Rudasingwa had become increasingly critical of President Kagame’s tightening grip on power. After disagreements with the Kagame administration, he left Rwanda in 2004 and settled in the United States. In exile, he joined other dissidents and in 2010 co-founded the Rwanda National Congress (RNC), a broad opposition coalition seeking democratic reforms in Rwanda. He has continued to denounce human rights abuses and “state-sponsored terrorism” under the Kagame government. In 2011, Rudasingwa and fellow exiles released a 60-page “Rwanda Briefing” document criticizing the regime, after which the Rwandan government tried and convicted him in absentia on politically charged counts (sentencing him to 24 years). He also took part in the 2013 trials in Spain concerning war crimes and genocide, providing testimony about the actions of RPF leaders.

== Other Initiatives ==
In exile, Rudasingwa has engaged in educational and reconciliation initiatives. He founded and leads the Eastern Africa Meta-University (EAMU), a free online institution serving refugees and underserved students in the region. He is also a co-founder of the Rwanda Truth Commission, an independent group established to document rights abuses in Rwanda’s history. Through such efforts, he aims to promote truth-telling, justice, and national healing in Rwanda.

Dr. Theogene Rudasingwa is a co-founder of both the Rwanda Freedom Movement–ISHAKWE, which champions human rights, democracy, and the rule of law, and the Rwanda Truth Commission, an independent body committed to promoting truth-telling as a pathway toward restorative justice, healing, and reconciliation in the aftermath of the genocide

== Publications ==
Rudasingwa is the author of several memoirs and essays. His works include Healing a Nation: A Testimony (2013), in which he recounts Rwanda’s struggle to recover after the genocide, and Urgent Call: The Imperative for Regime Change and Societal Transformation in Rwanda (2014). He also co-authored Voices from Exile: Readings in Rwanda’s Contemporary Protest Movement (2016). In recent years, he has written numerous opinion articles and open letters (e.g., in Black Star News and Democracy in Africa) on the region’s political crises, including on peace deals, Kagame’s policies, and regional conflicts (2021–2025).

== Media and Public Appearances ==
Rudasingwa has been interviewed and cited extensively in international media. In 2010, he appeared on Voice of America discussing the leaked UN Congo war crimes report and calling for transparency, and later that year urged global pressure on Kagame in support of jailed opposition leaders. He has characterized Rwanda under Kagame as “a virtual prison”, and in 2021–2022 spoke on Al Jazeera and other outlets about trials of dissidents and regional affairs. The Guardian profiled him in 2022 in the context of a purported coup plot, noting that he refused to endorse violence, stating, “I do not believe in [removing Kagame by violence] and my organization does not believe in it”. In February 2025, he contributed commentary in The Times, warning that Kagame’s support for militias in eastern Congo could destabilize the region.

== Personal life ==
Rudasingwa is married to Dorothy Rudasingwa; the couple has four children.

== Timeline: Key Milestones ==
Timeline of Key Milestones
Year	Event
1990–1994	Served as RPA Major, battlefield physician, and RPF liaison during Civil War/Genocide
1996–1999	Ambassador of Rwanda to the US.
2000–2004	Chief of Staff to President Kagame.
2004	Went into exile in the US.
2010	Co-founded Rwanda National Congress (RNC); publicly pushed for war-crime transparency and opposition leadership.
2013–2016	Authored Healing a Nation, Urgent Call, and Voices from Exile.
2013	Testified in Spain against Kagame and RPF war-crimes.
2016	Led a breakaway New RNC, denouncing Hutu genocide and internal splits.
2018–2022	Published regional analyses and open letters on international stages.
2025	Continued critical commentary on Kagame and Rwanda–DRC tensions.
