= Nokuzola Mlengana =

South African actress (1962-2021)

- Born: Nokuzola Elizabeth Mlengana; 28 September 1962; Eastern Cape, South Africa
- Died: 12 July 2021 (aged 58); Lyndhurst, South Africa
- Other names: Sis Ouma
- Occupation: Actress
- Years active: 2014–2021
- Children: 3

Nokuzola Elizabeth Mlengana (28 September 1962 – 12 July 2021), popularly known as Sis Ouma, was a South African actress. She is best known for the role in the soap opera Skeem Saam.

== Personal life ==
Mlengana was born on 28 September 1962 in Port St. John's, Eastern Cape, South Africa. She dropped out of school in grade 11 because of teenage pregnancy. Then she started to sell clothes and groceries for living. In 1994, she relocated to Johannesburg with family.

Later she got married in 1997 but divorced in 2005. She was a mother of three children: Siyosindiswa, Nonzaliseko Toni, and Patience. After the divorce, she had depression, but was not treated.

She died from pneumonia on 12 July 2021 in Lyndhurst, Johannesburg at the age of 58. Her funeral service was held on 16 July 2021 in Makhanda, Eastern Cape.

== Career ==
Her acting career started when she was 45 years old. In 2014, she had auditions for a new role in the third season of popular SABC1 soap opera Skeem Saam. After that, she got the opportunity to play the role of "Sis Ouma" in the soapie. She continued to play the role for seven consecutive years with the peak of her popularity until her death.
