= Noxolo Maqashalala =

South African actress (1977–2021)

- Born: 1977; KwaBhaca, Eastern Cape
- Died: 12 March 2021 (aged 43–44)
- Other names: Noxee
- Occupation: Occupation

Noxolo Maqashalala (1977 – March 2021) was a South African actress often known by the name Noxee.

== Career ==
Maqashalala was born in KwaBhaca, Eastern Cape. Her break-out role was as Viwe in the first three seasons of youth drama series Tsha Tsha from 2003 to 2005. She also appeared in the SABC 1 shows Generations, Binnelanders, Dream World and Intersexions, the SABC 2 show Gauteng Maboneng, and e.tv's Rhythm City, Easy Money, Mzansi Love and The Kingdom - uKhakhayi. She also starred in the SABC 1 legal drama Diamond City in 2018 and was credited as an executive producer on the show. Diamond City later also aired on Netflix.

== Death ==
She was found dead at her Johannesburg home on 12 March 2021, aged 44. Eastern Cape arts, culture, sport and recreation MEC Fezeka Nkomonye commended her as being exemplary in the arts and called her death "a blow to the industry". South Africa's minister of sport, arts and culture, Nathi Mthethwa, called her "a sterling performer who gave her best at every role that she took on".

== Filmography ==
=== Film ===
Year	Title	Role	Notes
2004	Hotel Rwanda	Chloe	
2009	Bitterness	Wendy	

=== Television ===
Year	Title	Role	Notes
1996	Tarzan: The Epic Adventures		Season 1, Episode 10
2003–2005	Tsha Tsha	Viwe	Three seasons
	The Kingdom - uKhakhayi	Nopasika	Season 1
	Rhythm City	Zothile Gumpe	Season 1
	Mzansi Love	Busi	Season 3
2010	Intersexions	Mandisa	Season 1
	Generations	Guest star	Season 1
2011	Gauteng Maboneng	Pearl	Seasons 2 and 3
	Easy Money	Zee	Season 1
	Dream World	Joyce	Season 2
	Diamond City	Zandile	Season 1
	Binnelanders	Doctor Williams	Season 7
