= Kayumba Nyamwasa =

Rwandan former military officer (born 1958)

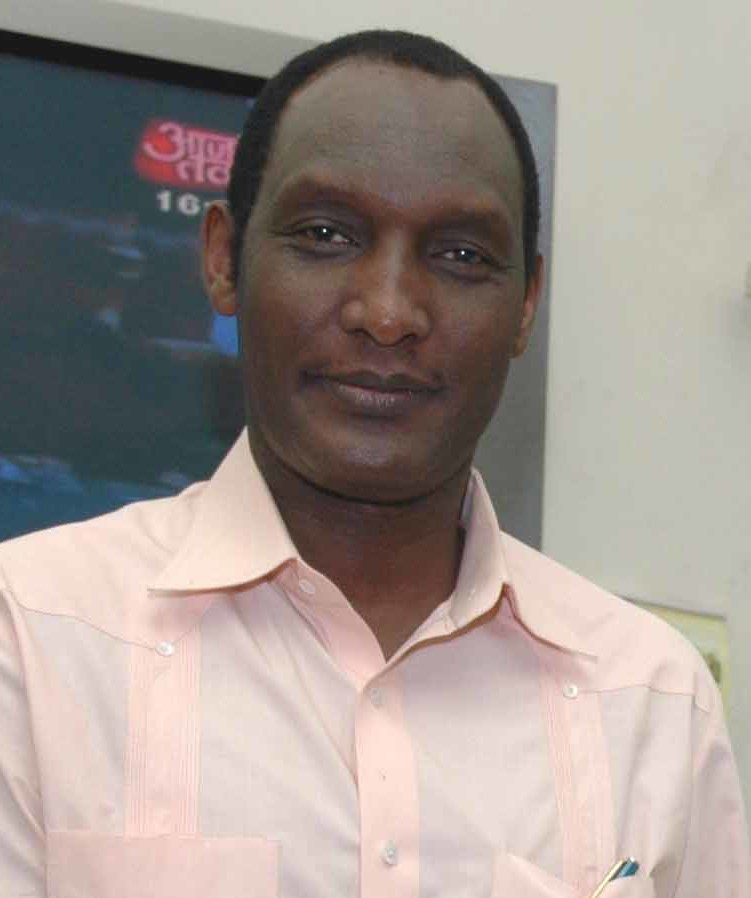
Nyamwasa, 2008

Faustin Kayumba Nyamwasa (born 1958) is a Rwandan former lieutenant general who served as the Chief of Staff of the Rwandan Patriotic Army from 1998 to 2001. He was also head of Rwandan intelligence, and later served as Rwanda's ambassador to India between 2004 and 2010. Nyamwasa has been an opposition leader in exile since as part of the Rwanda National Congress.

== Rise and fall with RPF ==
A Tutsi born in Uganda Nyamwasa grew up in Rukungiri in western Uganda. He was educated at St. Paul Seminary, Rushoroza in Kabale for O- Levels before joining St. Henry’s College Kitovu for A-Level. He later earned a law degree in Makerere University. He later joined Yoweri Museveni's National Resistance Army in January 1986 and served as a Ugandan military officer before 1990. With Paul Kagame, he contributed to the creation of the Rwandan Patriotic Front (RPF) in the late 1980s and was considered a central figure in the military during the RPF campaign and the post genocidal period, when he oversaw anti-insurgency campaigns in the country's north-west.

A 2006 French inquiry with the International Criminal Tribunal for Rwanda accused Nyamwasa, Kagame and four other officials of organizing the shooting down the plane of then Rwandan president Juvénal Habyarimana. The event is cited as the catalyst for the Rwandan genocide. Nyamwasa has also been accused by Spain of ordering the killing of three Spanish NGO workers and a Canadian priest. The group allegedly were targeted because they had evidence of the RPF killing Hutu civilians.

As a colonel, he was appointed as the Rwandan Patriotic Army (RPA) chief of staff in February 1998. Nyamwasa may have been falling out with Kagame as early as 1998. Historian Gérard Prunier states that he and others may have been envious of the foreign aide money being siphoned off by Kagame and friends around this time. An RPF invasion of eastern Democratic Republic of the Congo was seen as a way for all to get "a share of the spoils".

He was promoted to brigadier general and oversaw operations during the Second Congo War. He frequently spoke to coordinate with his Uganda People's Defence Force (UPDF) counterpart, Major General Jeje Odongo. In May 1999, he stated that there had been several hundred casualties among Rwandan troops in the DRC, and said that they would remain in the country "as long as it takes" to destroy the Hutu Interahamwe militia. Nyamwasa and Odongo arrived in Kisangani in August 1999 to take command from their respective subordinates, James Kabarebe and James Kazini, and implement a ceasefire there after fighting between their troops. Relations between the two military chiefs worsened leading up to the Six-Day War in June 2000. Nyamwasa accused Uganda of violating the ceasefire hours after it was signed. In August 2000, he called on the international community to pressure DRC president Laurent-Désiré Kabila to implement the Lusaka Peace Agreement. Nyamwasa had been promoted to major general as of January 2001.

Nyamwasa was replaced as chief of staff with Brig. Gen. James Kabarebe in November 2001. He was made Rwandan ambassador to India in 2004, possibly in an attempt by Kagame to keep a political rival far away from the country. When he returned to Rwanda to bury his mother, he was summoned by military officials who are alleged to demand "he write Kagame an apology for a list of perceived infractions." In response, Nywamwasa fled to South Africa on 28 February 2010 and sought exile there.

In South Africa, Nyamwasa partnered with former RPF official Gerald Gahima and Theogene Rudasingwa to create the opposition Rwanda National Congress. The RNC has joined with a coalition of Tutsi and Hutu who oppose President Kagame.

The Rwandan government later stated that he may have been working with Colonel Patrick Karegeya, another former intelligence head who was living in exile in South Africa. Karegeya was found murdered in a Johannesburg hotel on December 31, 2013. The RNC accuse agents of President Kagame of carrying out the assassination. The day after Karageya's assassination, President Kagame told a rally “Whoever betrays the country will pay the price, I assure you...Whoever it is, it is a matter of time.”

== Assassination attempt in South Africa ==
In June 2010, Brigadier General Jean Bosco Kazura, head of the Rwandese Association Football Federation, traveled to South Africa to see the World Cup and allegedly contacted Nyamwasa. Kazura was recalled and placed under arrest, although an army spokesman said this was purely because he had failed to obtain permission to travel.

Nyamwasa was shot in the stomach in Johannesburg, South Africa on 19 June 2010. Several people arrested after the shooting were found to be Rwandan. Kayumba was recorded to have said that Kagame wants him dead because he challenges his dictatorial views. Nyamwasa's wife stated that the attack was politically motivated. Al-Jazeera reported that "Rosette said they were in the parking lot of their home and a man came to the side of the car with a pistol and shot at her husband who managed to get out of the car and then there was a scuffle. The driver of the car then chased the assailant away."

Four men were convicted for the attempt on Nyamwasa's life. Rwandan businessman Pascal Kanyandekwe was accused by a South African magistrate of masterminding the plot, but was not brought to trial. Kanyandekwe was said to have tried to bribe a police officer with $1 million to let him off.

Jean-Léonard Rugambage, a Rwandan journalist who investigated the attempt on Nyamwasa's life, was murdered a few days later in Kigali.

== Exile ==
Nyamwasa is accused by Rwandan authorities of involvement in acts of terrorism, including three grenade attacks in Kigali on 19 February 2010, but was not arrested in South Africa due to a lack of evidence and extradition treaties between the two countries. In 2011, the Military High Court in Kigali condemned him and other RNC founders for terrorist acts, threat to state security and public order. He was stripped of his military rank, removed from the army and sentenced to 24 years in prison. All four men were tried in absentia.

A December 2018 report from the United Nations accuses Nyamwasa of traveling back and forth from South Africa and the South Kivu province of the Democratic Republic of the Congo recruiting soldiers to fight Rwanda. His alleged group, called P5 (Platform Five), is said to be under the umbrella of the opposition group in exile Rwanda National Congress. P5 is alleged to receive financial support from Burundi and Uganda, and additional recruits from South Africa and Tanzania.

== Personal life ==
He was married to Rosette Nyamwasa.
