= Seif Bamporiki =

Rwandan politician (died 2021)

Abdallah Seif Bamporiki (died 22 February 2021) was a Rwandan politician, member of the Rwanda National Congress (RNC). On 22 February 2021, Bamporiki was killed in South Africa by two gunmen after being pulled from his vehicle.
