= Sindi Buthelezi =

South African actress (1989–2021)

- Born: Sindisiwe Buthelezi; 8 February 1989; Gauteng, South Africa
- Died: 27 July 2021 (aged 32); Johannesburg, South Africa
- Education: Khaya-Lesedi Secondary School; University of Johannesburg
- Occupations: Actress, PR practitioner
- Years active: 2010–2021
- Notable work: Babe Come Duze
- Height: 174 cm (5 ft 9 in)

Sindisiwe 'Sindi' Buthelezi (8 February 1989 – 27 July 2021) was a South African actress and PR practitioner. She is best known for the roles in the television serials such as Generations, Soul City and Ashes to Ashes.

== Personal life ==
Buthelezi was born on 8 February 1989 in the Gauteng province, South Africa and brought up in East Rand in a small town, Ratanda. She matriculated from Khaya-Lesedi Secondary School. Then she attended the University of Johannesburg (UJ) and completed a degree in Public Relations and Communication. She had one elder sister, Nonhlanhla Sikhakhane.</ref>

She has had one daughter.

== Career ==
In 2011, she played the lead role of "Udalana" in the student film called Open window school of communication. After two years of practice in Public Relations, she quit the job and started drama. She started drama career after joining a local community hall performing drama. Then she got the opportunity to act in the Mzansi Magic short film Babe Come Duze. In the short, she had the role of "Sbongile".

In 2013, she joined the popular SABC1 soap opera Generations and played the role of "Zinhle Mathe". Even though her role became very popular, she did not reprise her role after the soapie went through a rebranding. In 2014, she joined the cast of the twelfth season of the SABC1 HIV/AIDS drama serial Soul City with the role of "Ntombi". After that success, she was appointed one of the judges in the McDonald spelling BEE competition as well. In 2016, she appeared in the e.tv telenovela Ashes to Ashes with a guest role of "Patience Khumalo". In the same year, she acted in the film Noble Pictures with the lead role of "Mavis Khumalo".

== Filmography ==
Year	Film	Role	Genre	Ref.
	Babe Come Duze	Sbongile	Short film	
2013	Generations	Zinhle	TV series	
2014	Soul City	Ntombi	TV series	
2015	Ashes to Ashes	Patience	TV series	
2015	Isibaya	KZN Reporter 2	TV series	

== Death ==
Buthelezi died of diabetes-related complications on 27 July 2021 at the age of 32.
