= Luzuko Nteleko =

South African actor (1984-2021)

- Born: Luzuko S'phelo Nteleko; 16 February 1984; Sebokeng, South Africa
- Died: 21 June 2021 (aged 37); Gauteng, South Africa
- Education: Technikon Witwatersrand
- Occupations: Actor, Entrepreneur
- Years active: 2002–2018

Luzuko S'phelo Nteleko (16 February 1984 – 21 June 2021) was a South African actor and entrepreneur. He was best known for the roles in the television serials Mfolozi Street, Zone 14, Streets of Mangaung, Gauteng Maboneng and Muvhango.

== Early life ==
Luzuko Nteleko was born on 16 February 1984 in Sebokeng, Gauteng, South Africa. He left home at the age of 19 and moved to Johannesburg to pursue a career. He enrolled at Technikon Witwatersrand to study tourism management, but dropped out in 2002. He had five sisters and two brothers including, Nomsa Nteleko.

== Career ==
In early 2000s, he made popular appearances in advertisements, particularly remembered for Absa's banking app TV commercial. In 2004, he got the opportunity to join with a British production house and played the lead role of a DStv's Discovery Channel docu-drama.

In 2005, he joined the third season of the SABC1 drama serial Zone 14, playing the role of "Loyiso". The character became very popular, and he continued in the role during the fourth season as well. In 2012, he appeared as "Student Constable Lebogang Chuene" on season one of SABC2 police procedural serial Streets of Mangaung. In 2014, he played the role of "Jacob Boy" in the Mzansi Magic miniseries 4 Hours. Later in the same year, he appeared in the SABC1 sitcom Single Galz in a guest role as "Bobby".

Then in 2015, he acted in the SABC2 soap opera Muvhango, by playing the role of "Lwazi". In the same year, he had the recurring role of "Lwazi" on the SABC1 drama serial Mfolozi Street. He continued to play the role until 2016. In 2016, he joined the third season of SABC1 fashion drama serial Tempy Pushas, where he played the role of "X". In 2018, he acted in the LGBTQ US drama series About Him and played the role of "Zumbi". His final television appearance was in the Mzansi political serial Ambitions where he played the role of "Wandile Cibane".

He was also a businessman and a soccer player. He owned an educational and industrial theatre and promotions company.

== Death ==
In 2019, Nteleko was diagnosed with Stage 4 brain cancer. In 2021, he spent seven weeks in ICU in a coma. He died on 21 June 2021, at the age of 37. A memorial service was held on 26 July 2021 at 1pm at Sebokeng, Zone 14 Sports Centre. Public participation was restricted due to COVID-19 pandemic, but the service was streamed live on YouTube and broadcast on channel 504 on Mpumalanga Broadcasting Television at 6pm. His remains were laid to rest at his family home in the Eastern Cape on 2 July 2021.

== Filmography ==
Year	Film	Role	Genre	Ref.
2005	Zone 14	Loyiso	TV series	
2010	City Ses'la	Guest Star	TV series	
2012	Streets of Mangaung	Student Constable Lebogang Chuene	TV series	
2013	isiPantsula	Xolani	TV series	
2013	eKasi: Our Stories	John	TV series	
2013	Mzansi Love	JJ	TV series	
2014	Single Galz	Bobby	TV series	
2014	Gauteng Maboneng	Byron "Two Feet" Majozi	TV series	
2014	4 Hours	Jacob Boy	TV series	
2014	Mfolozi Street	Lwazi	TV series	
2015	Muvhango	Lwazi	TV series	
2016	Keeping Score	Zuko	TV series	
2016	Tempy Pushas	X	TV series	
2017	Isidingo	Manqoba	TV series	
2017	Ring of Lies	OPW Director	TV series	
2018	About Him	Zumbi	TV series	
2018	Ambitions	Wandile Cibane	TV series	
