= Mutodi Neshehe =

South African actor and model (1975-2021)

- Born: Mutodi Neshehe; 12 January 1975; Soweto, South Africa
- Died: 1 July 2021 (aged 46); Soweto, South Africa
- Occupations: Actor, Model
- Years active: 1985–2020
- Spouse: Leslee Dalton
- Children: 2
- Parents: Joseph Neshehe (father); Thelma Neshehe (mother)

Mutodi Neshehe (12 January 1975 – 1 July 2021) was a South African actor and model. He is best known for the roles in the television serials and soap operas such as Muvhango, Generations the legacy, Jacob's Cross, Skwizas and Broken Vows.

== Personal life ==
Neshehe was born on 12 January 1975 in Meadowlands, Soweto, South Africa. His father Joseph Neshehe is a businessman, who started Lesedi Clinic with Dr. N. Motlana. His mother Thelma Neshehe is a popular actress. He studied Environmental Science, Computer Programming in high school. After completing his studies in USA, he became a graduate with a Bachelor's degree in Business Administration.

He was married to Leslee Dalton, who he met in North Carolina. She relocated to South Africa to be with Neshehe in 2004. They separated in 2018 but reconciled in November 2020. The couple had two children.

He died on 1 July 2021 after COVID-19 complications at the age of 46. A drive-through memorial service was held at 929 Casebella Estate, Taylor Road, Honeydew due to COVID-19 pandemic of the country. The funeral service was started at 8am at Doxa Deo Church and the burial started at 11.30am at Westpark.

== Career ==
Neshehe began acting at the age of four particularly in commercials. At the age of 10, he made his film debut with Windrider directed by Darrell Roodt. At the age of 14, he went to the USA for studies. During his teen years in USA, he participated in various drama programs. In the meantime, he became a model and worked for RBA Studios, North Carolina and Worldwide Modeling Group in Atlanta, Georgia. In 2004, Neshehe returned to South Africa. After that, he got the opportunity to enter television. In 2006, he joined the SABC2 soap opera Muvhango and played the role of "Ndalamo Mukwevho". His role became very popular, where he continued to play the role until November 2008.

In 2007, he acted in the Roodt's film Lullaby. Then he appeared in the SABC3 comedy-drama One Way and the M-Net drama serial Jacob's Cross. In 2008, he joined the fifteenth season of M-Net soapi opera Egoli: Place of Gold as a guest. In the same year, he made the minor role "Gym Instructor" in the SABC2 sitcom Skwizas, ITV drama serial Wild at Heart and in the film Southern Cross. Later in the same year, he was invited to perform in the fourth season of SABC2 dance reality competition Strictly Come Dancing as a celebrity dancer.

In 2011, he appeared in the blockbuster Winnie Mandela, Stealing Time and in 2012 film Little One, all are directed by Roodt. He won the Best Achievement Award in Directing under Feature Film category at the 2013 South African Film and Television Awards (SAFTA) for the role in Little One. Apart from Roodt's films, he also acted in the 2011 film Elelwani directed by Ntshavheni Wa-Luruli and 2012 film Two Choices directed by Eugene Snyman. In 2015, he again moved to television, where he appeared in the SABC1 soap opera Generations: The Legacy with the role "Zola". In the Mzansi Magic drama series Rockville he made a guest role in the episode nine of fourth season in 2016. In the same year, he again made a guest role in an episode of the SABC2 sitcom Mamello.

In 2017, he made a recurring role of "Rendi" on the e.tv telenovela Broken Vows. After that success, he played the role of "Mandla" in the e.tv drama serial Harvest. Later in the year, he joined the cast of popular SABC2 soap opera 7de Laan with the role "Carter". In 2020, he acted in the short Three Stops co-directed by Anton Ernst and Tati Golykh. For his role, he won the Special Jury Award for Best Supporting Actor at the Indie Short Fest. In the same time, he was also nominated for the Best Acting Duo with Tati Golykh at the IndieX Film Festival.

== Filmography ==
Year	Film	Role	Genre	Ref.
1985	Windrider	child role	Film	
2006	Muvhango	Ndalamo Mukwevho	TV series	
2006	One Way	Guest role	TV series	
2007	Jacob's Cross	Ben Khumalo	TV series	
2008	Egoli: Place of Gold	Guest role	TV series	
2010	Skwizas	Gym Instructor	TV series	
2011	Wild at Heart	James	TV series	
2011	Winnie Mandela	Jerry	Film	
2012	Elelwani	King Ratshihule	Film	
2013	Little One	Detective Morena	Film	
2013	Stealing Time		Film	
2015	Rise	Vincent Zondo	TV movie	
2015	Generations	Zola	TV series	
2016	Mamello	Amos	TV series	
2016	Rockville	Alex	TV series	
2016	Happiness Is a Four-letter Word	Ntuthuko	Film	
2016	Zaziwa	Himself	TV series	
2017	The Queen	Mike	TV series	
2017	Harvest	Mandla	TV series	
2017	Broken Vows	Rendi	TV series	
2017	7de Laan	Carter	TV series	
2019	Man in Crisis		Film	
2020	Three Stops	Maurice Cele	Short film	
