= Burundi Tobacco Company =

Burundian cigarette manufacturer

- Company type: Tobacco products production and distribution
- Founded: 1978
- Founder: Tribert Rujugiro Ayabatwa
- Headquarters: Bujumbura, Burundi
- Products: Supermatch cigarettes
- Owner: Pan African Tobacco Group

The Burundi Tobacco Company (BTC) manufactures cigarettes under the Supermatch brand in Burundi. It is a subsidiary of the Pan African Tobacco Group (PTG).

== History ==
Around 1970 the company's Rwandan founder, Tribert Rujugiro Ayabatwa (c. 1941 – 2024), started to import wheat, flour, salt and cigarettes into Burundi from Tanzania. By 1974 cigarettes were becoming his main import. In 1978 he decided to use his profits to manufacture cigarettes in Burundi rather than importing them.

BTC was founded in 1979. In 1982 it made an agreement with farmers in Cibitoke Province and Kirundo Province to supply seed, fertilizer, pesticides, crop extension services, drying and processing, and to buy their tobacco at a price agreed upon in advance. The result was rapid growth in the number of tobacco farmers and the quantity produced. In the 1980s the Burundi Tobacco Company (BTC) started to clear large areas of forest in Kirundo Province to supply wood to the ovens used to dry tobacco, but did not undertake reforestation.

In 1987 President Pierre Buyoya ovethrew Colonel Jean-Baptiste Bagaza and Ayabatwa was imprisoned in Bujumbura. He was charged with aiding the previous government. BTC was the most important agro-industrial firm in Burundi until 1989, when it was placed under government trusteeship. BTC struggled with high taxes on both its imports and its exports, which damaged its profitability. Later the government of Burundi restored BTC, intact, to Ayabatwa.

A 2013 World Health Organization report noted that the company had in the past given subsidies to tobacco farmers in Burundi for production and selling, but it was no longer doing so. Only 1,500–1,700 hectares (3,700–4,200 acres) of land was being used for cultivation of tobacco, and this was being used by farmers to make hand-rolled cigarettes for personal use.

BTC was the only company making tobacco products in Burundi in 2013, but imported all its tobacco. Before 2006 it was importing less than 100 tons per year, but in 2009 and 2010 imported over 500 tons per year. BTC exported most of its cigarettes to Uganda, with Rwanda the next largest market. In 2009 it exported about 10 million packs, and in 2012 about 9 million packs.

== Trademark disputes ==
In 1996 BTC let Mastermind Tobacco Uganda Ltd. use its "Supermatch" trademark. In July 2002 BTC discontinued the arrangement on the grounds that Mastermind's cigarettes did not meet BTC's quality requirements. They transferred the trademark to Leaf Tobacco, a new company based in Kireka. The Ugandan commercial court ordered Mastermind to halt production of Supermatch cigarettes until the trademark infringement case had been resolved.

In 2005 a dispute over the "Supermatch" trademark was resolved against BTC by the High Court of Tanzania. BTC had resistered the trademark in 1990, but did not renew it when it expired in 1997. Tanzania Cigarette Company applied to register "Supermatch" as its trademark, but was refused by the Registrar. In 2002 BTC said it had assigned the trademark to Mastermind Tobacco (Tanzania). The court ruled that BTC had abandoned the trademark, which should be granted to Tanzania Cigarette Company.

In 2019 a South Sudan court ruled that Mastermind of Kenya, the parent company of Mastermind Tobacco Uganda, could not export its Supermatch cigarettes to South Sudan in competition with Leaf. The Ugandan position was that they could "escort" Mastermind's cigarettes across Uganda to South Sudan, but it was up to the South Sudan customs to decide whether to admit them.

== See also ==
- List of companies of Burundi
- Economy of Burundi

== Sources ==
- Carmel Rickard (3 April 2019), "Article 2845", AfricanLII
- "I cannot fight Kagama, says Rujugiro", New Vision (Uganda), 18 March 2019
- Jude Etyang (27 October 2002), "Cigarette Firm Told To Cease", New Visiom (Uganda)
- Mfonobong Nsehe (1 January 2014), "Meet The Richest Tobacco Man In Africa, Tribert Rujugiro Ayabatwa", Forbes Magazine
- Mfonobong Nsehe (4 August 2021), Tribert Rujugiro Ayabatwa's Business and Philanthropic Legacy Will Outlive His Detractors
- Needs assessment for implementation of the WHO Framework Convention on Tobacco Control in Burundi (PDF), WHO Framework Convention Secretariat, September 2013
- "Récoltes : Kirundo aux anges, mais …", IWACU (in French), 5 May 2013
- Tanzania Cigarette Company Limited vs Burundi Tobacco Company Limited (PDF), High Court of Tanzania, 22 July 2005
- Report No. 9686-BU Burundi. Private Sector Development in Agriculture, World Bank Agriculture Operations Division South-Central and Indian Ocean Department Africa Region, 22 January 1993
