= Gerald Gahima =

Rwandan judge

Gerald Gahima is a judge with the War Crimes Chamber of the Court of Bosnia-Herzegovina and a leading figure in the Rwanda National Congress, a political group established in 2010 that represents the exiled opposition to the government of Rwandan President Paul Kagame. Beginning in 1996, he served as chief adviser in the Ministry of Justice. He later became Prosecutor General of Rwanda. Gahima has been in exile since falling out with Kagame, and was recently sentenced to 20 years in jail by a Rwandan court on charges that may have been politically motivated. He was a senior fellow at the United States Institute of Peace from 2006-2007. He is the author of "Transitional Justice in Rwanda: Accountability for Atrocity" published by Routledge in 2013, in which he draws on his experience in Rwanda's justice system to assess the ICTR, national genocide trials, and gacaca.
