= Rwanda National Congress =

Rwandan opposition group in exile

The Rwanda National Congress (RNC; Kinyarwanda: Ihuriro Nyarwanda; French: Congrès national rwandais) is a Rwandan opposition group in exile, established in the United States on 12 December 2010. Prominent founders included Dr. Theogene Rudasingwa, Gen. Kayumba Nyamwasa, Gerald Gahima, and Patrick Karegeya. Karegeya was murdered on 31 December 2013. Rudasingwa and Gahima have since left the organization.

== Rudasingwa-Nyamwasa break ==
In July 2016, Rudasingwa formed a breakaway faction called the "New RNC". Rudasingwa lamented "the disruptive influence of Lt. Gen. Kayumba Nyamwasa" and the decision "to go ahead with elections in August, 2016, [...] without first discussing and resolving the major problems facing the organization". In September, New-RNC declared that it had "decided to rise to the historic responsibility of naming the crimes committed against the Rwandan Hutu in Rwanda and the Democratic Republic of Congo by their rightful name, genocide." It released a list of what it called "masterminds of the genocide against the Rwanda Hutu", which included Nyamwasa. The "old" RNC announced the names of its "newly elected executives" the same month, which did not include Rudasingwa nor Gahima.

== Role in Rwanda-Uganda relations ==
In March 2019, a diplomatic conflict emerged between Rwanda and its neighbor Uganda. The Rwandan minister of foreign affairs Richard Sezibera accused Uganda of supporting the RNC and allowing them a base in Uganda. Uganda denied the accusations. Ugandan president Yoweri Museveni admitted to meeting with a member of the RNC but said he told them Uganda cannot support their cause.

== Other leaders ==
- Seif Bamporiki (d. 2021), lived in exile in South Africa
- Callixte Sankara until 2017
