= Mathilde Mukantabana =

Rwandan diplomat, ambassador to the US

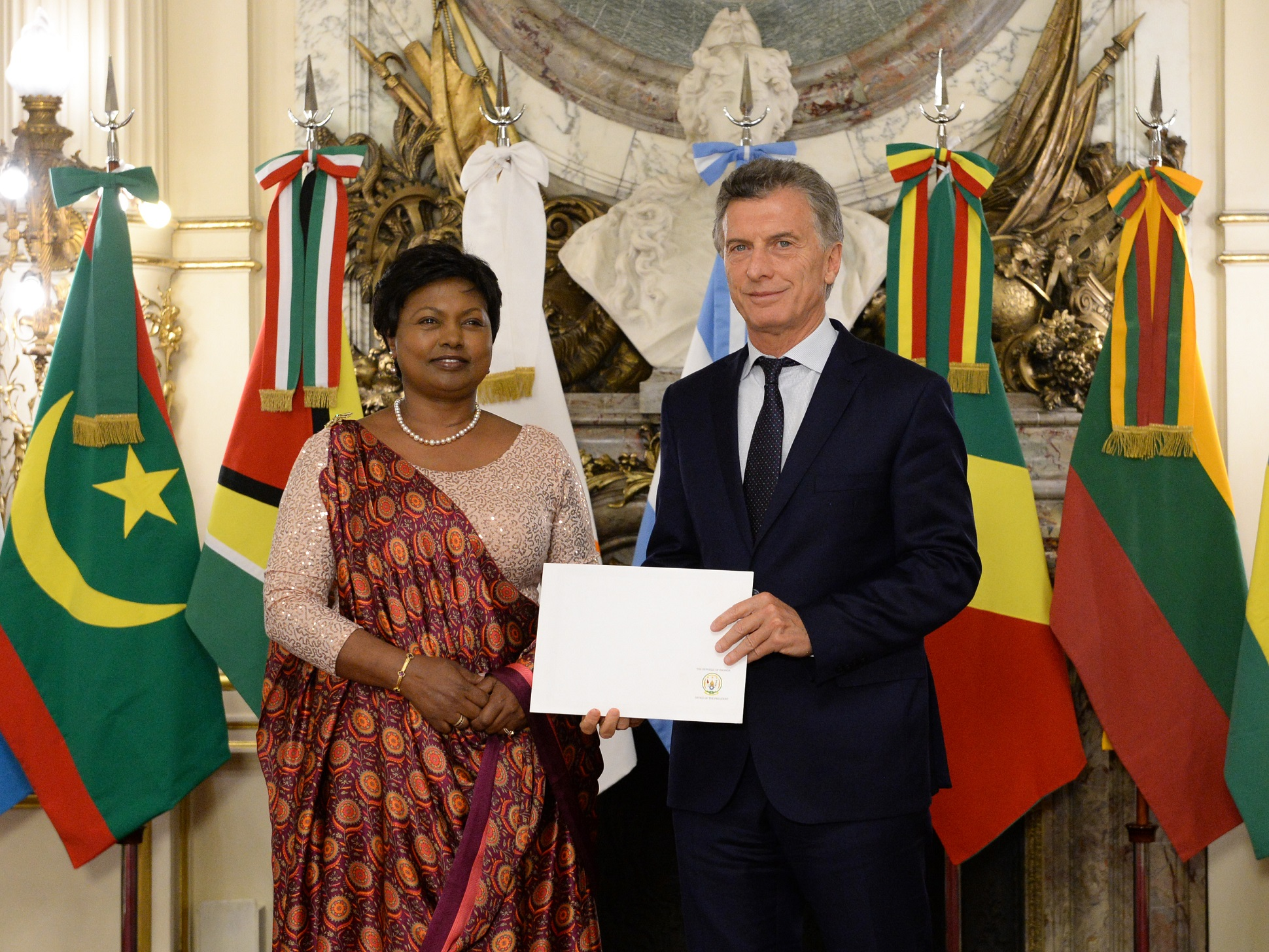
Mathilde Mukantabana & Mauricio Macri

Mathilde Mukantaba (born 1958) is a Rwandan politician and diplomat.

== Biography ==
Mukantabana was born in Butare, Rwanda. In 1994, she lost her parents, five siblings and extended family members during the Rwandan genocide.

As of 2013 was the Rwandan Ambassador to the USA and non-resident Ambassador to Mexico, Brazil, and Argentina, after being appointed in 2013. Mukantabana is the President and co-founder of the non-profit Friends of Rwanda Association (F.O.R.A.).

In 2016, Mukantabana spoke at the "22nd Commemoration of the 1994 Genocide against the Tutsi" event at the Embassy of Rwanda in Washington, D.C.

In May 2023, Mukantabana received an Honorary Doctor of Humane Letters from her alma mater, California State University. She has also been honoured by former President of the United States Barack Obama.
