= Sam Phillips (sailor) =

Australian sailor

Personal information
- Nationality: Australian
- Born: 6 September 1991 (age 33)

Sport
- Sport: Sailing

Sam Phillips (born 6 September 1991) is an Australian sailor. Phillips competed in the 49er event at the 2020 Summer Olympics. He and his brother, Will, managed a rank of twelfth and therefore were not in medal contention.
