= Sam Phillips (South African actor) =

South African actor and director (1948–2021)

- Born: Sam Phillips; 18 March 1948; Cape Town, South Africa
- Died: 16 January 2021 (aged 72); Johannesburg, South Africa
- Education: Langa High School
- Occupations: Actor, writer, director, producer, music composer
- Years active: 1971–2020
- Children: 6

Sam Phillips (18 March 1948 – 16 January 2021) was a South African actor, writer, director, producer and music composer. He is best known for the roles in the television serials such as Soul City and Jacob's Cross.

== Personal life ==
Married and a father of six children: Choppa, Mpho, Mpumi, Late Nomzamo, Mthunzi and Ntsoaki. Phillips died on 16 January 2021 in Johannesburg at the age of 72.

== Career ==
Sam Phillips studied drama from Langa High School in Cape Town. In the year 1971, he performed in the first black production called The Sacrifice of Kreli. In the same year, he joined the Market Theatre and performed in the Shakespearean play Merchant of Venice. Then in 1974, he joined the non-racial People's Space Theatre where he got the opportunity to perform in the play Lysistrata. The play was the first multi-racial production in South Africa. In 1980, he settled in Johannesburg and had lead roles in many religious programs in early SABC TV 2 such as; Monna wa Cyrene and Ibali lika Yona. In the meantime, he worked as an assistant editor at Kinnerland and Scholtz Filoms for the films such as; Motlhalefi Molefe, Ifa lika Mthetwa and Masechaba.

Having gained the experience, he later directed the play Woza Albert! performed at the McGowan theatre at UCLA. The play also had several workshops at the Hollywood Theatre Rapport. Apart from local productions, he joined many international stage plays such as Master Herold and Boys in New Orleans produced by Athol Fugard, Absolom's Song produced by Selaelo Maredi. He also played the main supporting role in the play Ace Ventura: When Nature Calls. In 1990, he played the lead in the short Senzeni na?. For his role, he was nominated for Oscar award in Best Short Story category at the American Film Institution (AFI).

In 2007, he joined the eighth season of the SABC 1 HIV/AIDS drama serial Soul City and played the role of "Odwa". The role became very popular and marked the turning point in his television career. In the same year, he appeared in the M-Net series Jacob's Cross and played the role of "Wilfred Kau" in four continuous seasons. In 2011, he joined the M-Net soap opera The Wild and played the role of "Kgosi Rratladi Tladi". He continued to play the role until 2012. In 2013, he acted in the kykNET period drama serial Donkerland and then in the second season of Mzansi Magic soapie Isibaya in 2014. His final television role came through the South African Netflix supernatural serial Kings of Jo'Burg where he played the supportive role of "Samuel Senior".

As a song producer, Phillips joined Nna Sajene Kokobela and 102 Paradise Complex, where he composed the music for the song "102 Paradise Complex" sung by Brenda Fassie, Nna Sajene Kokobela, Motlhalefi Molefe and Nonwane. Later, he wrote the lyrics for the feature Bopha!, which was directed by veteran actor Morgan Freeman.

== Filmography ==
Year	Film	Role	Genre	Ref.
1998	Die Vierde Kabinet	Minister	TV series	
2005	City Ses'la	Mr. Cele	TV series	
2005	Gaz'lam	Portia's father	TV series	
2006	Heartlines	Principal Matabane	TV series	
2006	The Lab	Vusi Mambolo	TV series	
2006	Izoso Connexion	Tshasa	TV series	
2007	Jacob's Cross	Wilfred Kau	TV series	
2007	90 Plein Street	Deputy President	TV series	
2007	Soul City	Odwa	TV series	
2008	The Coconuts	The Old Man	TV series	
2011	Erfsondes	Mvuyisi	TV series	
2011	The Wild	Kgosi Rratladi Tladi	TV series	
2012	iNkaba	Chairman	TV series	
2013	Donkerland	Bongani	TV series	
2014	Isibaya	Mbuyazi	TV series	
2015	Ya Lla	Kobo	TV series	
2015	Ke Ba Bolelletse	Mudala	TV series	
2016	Umlilo	Tshokolo Tladi	TV series	
2016	Greed & Desire	Kgosi	TV series	
2017	Broken Vows	Thabang	TV series	
2018	The Queen	Tiro	TV series	
2020	Lithapo	Alpheus	TV series	
2020	Kings of Jo'Burg	Samuel Senior	TV series	
