= Patrick Karegeya =

Head of intelligence in Rwanda

Director General, External Intelligence of the Rwandan Defence Forces
- In office 1994–2004

Personal details
- Born: 1960 Mbarara, British Uganda
- Died: December 31, 2013 (aged 53) Johannesburg, South Africa

Patrick Karegeya (1960 – December 31, 2013) was a head of intelligence in Rwanda. He was a member of the Rwandan Patriotic Front (RPF) group that took power in Rwanda following the genocide against Tutsi. After becoming a critic of RPF leader Paul Kagame, he was stripped of his rank and jailed. Following a time in exile, he was assassinated in Johannesburg, South Africa on December 31, 2013.

== Early life, rise in Uganda ==
Karegeya was born in Mbarara in southwestern Uganda. He was a member of the Kinyarwanda speaking Tutsi people who had been exiled to Uganda from Rwanda following the 1959 Hutu revolution. As part of this tight knit community, from an early age he knew future RPF leaders like Kagame and Kayumba Nyamwasa. Karegeya earned a Bachelor of Law degree from Makerere University in Kampala, the same university attended by many post-colonial African leaders.

Like other Tutsi exiles, including RPF founder Fred Rwigyema, Karegeya joined the National Resistance Army (NRA) in Uganda. The NRA had been fighting the Ugandan Bush War. The war was led by Yoweri Museveni who was attempting to overthrow Ugandan president Milton Obote. According to his own account, he was arrested in June 1982 and charged with treason, spending three years in jail. After serving his sentence he rejoined the NRA as a lieutenant in Ugandan military intelligence. He claims the decision to invade Rwanda was made at this time by the Tutsi exiles while Kagame was studying in the United States.

== In power in Rwanda ==
In 1990, while now Ugandan president Museveni was in New York City at a United Nations conference, the RPF took many Ugandan arms and supplies and invaded Rwanda. Karegeya stayed behind in Uganda to serve as a liaison between intelligence agencies of Uganda and the RPF. Following the war and the genocide, Karegeya took up a position as head of intelligence for the RPF's new government in Rwanda. From 1994 to 2004, he held the post of Director General, External Intelligence in the Rwandan Defence Forces.

During his decade in charge of intelligence, Rwanda was involved in complex fighting both internally and in the eastern Zaire (now Democratic Republic of the Congo). Many Hutu, both Interahamwe (the group most responsible for the genocide) and innocent civilians, were packed into refugee camps on the Zaire-Rwanda border. This led to the creation of a large variety of militia groups being backed by different regional powers in the First and Second Congo War. Karegeya had a large role in coordinating intelligence for these wars and for dissident suppression at home.

Karegeya was arrested and served an 18-month sentence for desertion and insubordination. He was stripped of his rank of colonel on 13 July 2006 by a military tribunal and fled the country in 2007. Later, Kagame claimed that Karegeya was in the pay of South African military intelligence.

In August 2010, Karegeya told the Ugandan paper, The Observer, that Kagame was a dictator who would not leave power unless he was forced out by war. The same month, he told the BBC that Kagame had ordered a series of political killings.

== Death ==
On 1 January 2014, Karegeya was found dead at the Michelangelo Towers, an upmarket hotel in the Johannesburg suburb of Sandton in South Africa. Reports indicated that he had gone to attend a meeting at the hotel. The circumstances leading to his death remain unknown. The South African police are conducting investigations although the Rwandan opposition party, the Rwanda National Congress (RNC) said in a statement to AFP that "He was strangled by agents of [Rwandan President Paul] Kagame," having previously survived several assassination attempts. Karegeya left behind his wife Leah and three children.

Some days after his killing, Paul Kagame, in an apparent reference to Karegeya's murder, said that "You can't betray Rwanda and not get punished for it [...] Anyone, even those still alive, will reap the consequences. Anyone. It is a matter of time.". When confronted, Kagame denied responsibility, but added that "I actually wish Rwanda did it. I really wish it."

It was reported in the South African press that Karegeya had agreed to dispense with his South African security detail in 2012. The government of South Africa had provided the protection since Karegeya's arrival in South Africa in 2007. The decision to provide protection was reportedly influenced by assassination attempts against former army chief of staff Kayumba Nyamwasa, another Rwandan exile in South Africa.

Karegeya's family has accused South Africa of covering up his murder.

In January 2019, a state prosecutor launched an inquest into the assassination. The hope was to issue arrest warrants for the suspects who are believed to have fled back to Rwanda. On 19 January 2019, the Randburg Magistrates Court ruled that it was striking the murder inquest from its rolls as the prosecution had not produced any suspects.
