= List of wars involving Rwanda =

This is a list of wars involving Rwanda.

Conflict	Rwanda and allies	Opponents	Results	Ruler of Rwanda
Battle of Shangi (1896)	Kingdom of Rwanda	Congo Free State	Congo Free State victory	Mibambwe IV
Ndungutse's rebellion (1912)	German Empire: Kingdom of Rwanda; German East Africa	Ndungutse's coalition	Victory of Germany and the Rwandan monarchy	Yuhi V
Rwandan Revolution (1959–1961)	Kingdom of Rwanda	Parmehutu	Regime change: Rwanda became a republic	Kigeli V
Bugesera invasion (1963)	Rwanda; Belgium	Inyenzi	Rwandan government victory: Anti-Tutsi massacres in Rwanda	Grégoire Kayibanda
Rwandan Civil War (1990–1994)	Rwanda; Zaire (1990); France	Rwandan Patriotic Front (RPF)	Rwandan Patriotic Front (RPF) victory	Juvénal Habyarimana
First Congo War (1996–1997)	(Democratic Republic of the Congo) AFDL; Rwanda; Uganda; Burundi; Angola (South Sudan) SPLA; Eritrea; Supported by: South Africa; Zambia; Zimbabwe; Ethiopia; Tanzania; United States (covertly) Mai-Mai (Note: Many Mai-Mai militias in eastern Zaire initially allied themselves with Rwanda and the AFDL against Hutu militants and refugees. As soon as most Hutu were driven away, however, many Mai-Mai groups turned against Rwanda and the AFDL. Despite this, some anti-Hutu Mai-Mai remained allied with Rwanda and the AFDL.)	Zaire: FAZ; White Legion; Sudan; Chad (Rwanda) Ex-FAR/ALiR; Interahamwe; CNDD-FDD; UNITA; ADF; FLNC; Supported by: France; Central African Republic; China; Israel; Kuwait (denied) Mai-Mai	AFDL victory: Overthrow of the Mobutu regime; Zaire renamed back to the Democratic Republic of the Congo; Installation of Laurent-Désiré Kabila as president; Beginning of Second Congo War	Pasteur Bizimungu
Second Congo War (1998–2002)	Rwandan-aligned militias: RCD; RCD-Goma; Banyamulenge; Ugandan-aligned militias: MLC; Forces for Renewal; UPC; Other Tutsi-aligned forces; Anti-Angolan forces: UNITA; Foreign state actors: Uganda; Rwanda; Burundi; Libya (alleged)	Pro-government: DR Congo; Angola; Chad; Namibia; Zimbabwe; Sudan (alleged); Anti-Ugandan forces: LRA; ADF; UNRF II; FNI; Anti-Rwandan militias: FDLR; (Rwanda) ALiR; Interahamwe; RDR; Mai-Mai; Other Hutu-aligned forces; Anti-Burundi militias: CNDD-FDD; FROLINA	Military stalemate: Assassination of Laurent-Désiré Kabila; Sun City Agreement; Creation of a unified, multi-party government in DR Congo, with Joseph Kabila as president; Pretoria Accord; Rwandan withdrawal from DR Congo in exchange for commitment towards the disarmament of Hutu militias.; The Transitional Government of the Democratic Republic of the Congo is established, deployment of MONUC.; End of the Angolan Civil War.; Continuation of the Ituri conflict.; Start of the Kivu conflict.	Paul Kagame
Eastern Congo Offensive (2009)	DR Congo; Rwanda	FDLR (Democratic Republic of the Congo) Mai-Mai	DRC/Rwandan victory	Paul Kagame
Dongo Rebellion (2009)	Democratic Republic of the Congo; Supported by: (United Nations) MONUC; Rwanda (alleged)	Lobala rebels Possibly: Resistance Patriots of Dongo	Victory: DR Congo recaptures Dongo	Paul Kagame
South Sudanese Civil War (2013–2020)	(United Nations) UNMISS: (United Nations) Regional Protection Force; Rwanda; Ethiopia	South Sudan: SPLA; Air Force; Mathiang Anyoor; Maban Defence Force; Allied militias: SSLM; SRF: JEM (Note: The SPLM-IO accused JEM of supporting Kiir's government since 2013, though JEM has denied any involvement and claims to maintain neutrality in the South Sudanese Civil War. The Sudanese government, aid workers and other sources have however affirmed that JEM is taking part in conflict on the side of the South Sudanese government.); SPLM-N (alleged); SLA-AW; SLA-MM; EUPF (alleged); State allies: Uganda; Egypt (alleged) (South Sudan) SPLM-IO; Nuer White Army (South Sudan) SSDM: Cobra Faction (Note: The Cobra Faction openly opposed the government until 2014, and remained in relative opposition until 2015, when it divided into a pro-government and pro-SPLM-IO faction, the latter of which formed the Greater Pibor Forces. In early 2016, the Cobra Faction effectively disbanded, when the remaining group joined the government. In September 2016, however, the Cobra Faction was declared restored by some of its commanders and declared that it had resumed its struggle against the government.); Greater Pibor Forces (since 2015); (South Sudan) Agwelek forces; TFNF; SSFDP; South Sudan National Army; NAS; Arrow Boys (since Nov. 2015); Wau State insurgents SSOA (until September 2018); SSOMA/NSSSOG (until Jan. 2020); Supported by: Sudan (South Sudanese gov. claim)	Stalemate	Paul Kagame
Central African Republic Civil War (2020–)	Central African Republic; Central African Armed Forces; MINUSCA (since 2014) Rwanda (since 2020); Russia (since 2018); Wagner Group; Russian Imperial Movement; Black Russians; Azande Ani Kpi Gbe; Formerly: France (2013–2021)	Coalition of Patriots for Change (since 2020): Anti-balaka; 3R; UPC; FPRC; MPC; PRNC; CMSPR (since 2024) Support: Chad (alleged); RSF	Ongoing: Rwandan intervention in 2020	Paul Kagame
Insurgency in Cabo Delgado (2021–)	Mozambique; Rwanda (from 2021); Southern African Development Community (from 2021); South Africa; Botswana; Lesotho; Tanzania; Angola; Zambia; Malawi; DRC; Namibia	Ansar al-Sunna; Islamic State Bandits	Ongoing: Mozambican and Rwandan troops launch counteroffensive, taking back many towns and cities	Paul Kagame

== Sources ==
- Plaut, Martin (2016). Understanding Eritrea: Inside Africa's Most Repressive State. Oxford: Oxford University Press. ISBN 978-0-19-066959-1.
- Prunier, Gérard (July 2004). "Rebel Movements and Proxy Warfare: Uganda, Sudan and the Congo (1986-99)". African Affairs. 103 (412): 359–383. doi:10.1093/afraf/adh050. JSTOR 3518562.
- Prunier, Gérard (2009). Africa's World War: Congo, the Rwandan Genocide, and the Making of a Continental Catastrophe. Oxford: Oxford University Press. ISBN 978-0-19-970583-2.
- Reyntjens, Filip (2009). The Great African War: Congo and Regional Geopolitics, 1996-2006. Cambridge University Press. ISBN 978-0-521-11128-7.
