= Rwanda Defence Forces Army Band =

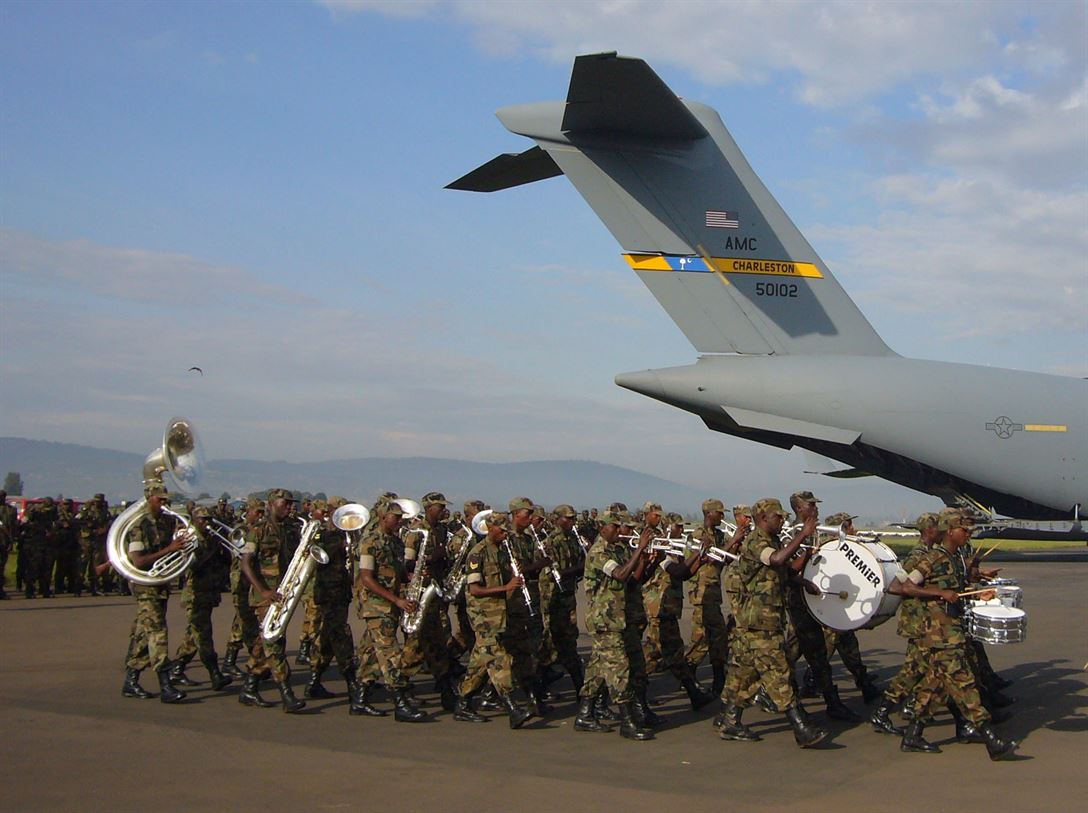
The RDF Band.

The Rwanda Defence Force Military Band Regiment is the ceremonial band that serves both State and Military. Although it represents the defence forces, it falls under the command of the Chief of Defence Staff. Since 2009 the RDF Military Band is commanded by Lieutenant Colonel Gilbert Ndayisabye. The RDF Band is made up of Headquarter and four ensembles:

- HQ/music training branch and workshop
- Harmony Band
- Brass Band
- Ceremonial Band
- Jazz Band (vocalists, dancers and drummers)

These ensembles perform throughout the Republic of Rwanda and the larger African continent. Many of its musicians have been deployed in recent years on Rwandan United Nations peacekeeping operations.

== History ==
The RDF Military Band was founded in 1992 during Liberation war in 1990 to 1994 and had its first performance on March 8, 1992 at Mulindi RPF/RPA HQ when it only had 40 members. After the war in 1994, it was re-established with 120 members who were trained by Ghanaian Military Band that was part of peacekeepers under UNAMIR (United Nation Mission in Rwanda). In 2005, Lieutenant Colonel Lemuel Kayumba was appointed commanding officer of the band deputised by Major Gilbert Ndayisabye. Under his leadership, the band introduced intensive training and relationships with other foreign military music schools. In 2008, the RDF Army sent the first contingent of 20 musicians to attend the South African Army Military Music Course, presented by the South African Army Band Cape Town with the assistance of the University of Stellenbosch. A year later, the 29 members of the band were participants in training conducted by the Uganda People's Defence Force Band at the Rwanda Military Academy in Nyakinama.

== Liberation Day events ==
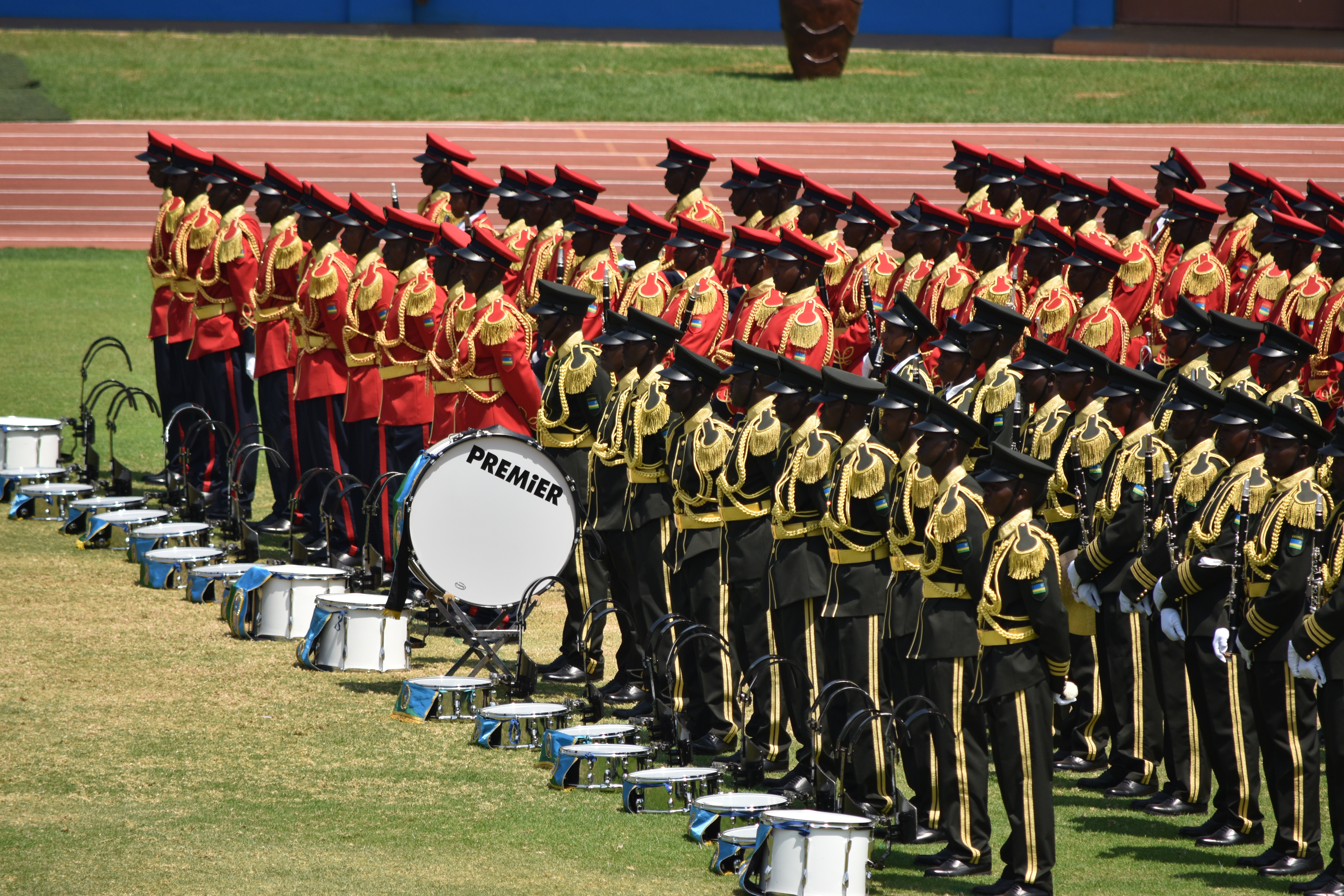
The RDF Band in full dress uniform.

The band performs at the annual parade at Amahoro Stadium during the Liberation Day celebrations. Wearing its standard red and green tunics, they perform the national anthem, Rwanda Nziza as well as marching displays. They also perform traditional military marches and native music such as the Swahili song Sisi Wenyewe. The band released a new album called Ubudasa in celebration of the 25th anniversary of liberation in 2019.

== Other events ==
Its jazz band has participated in joint performances with civilian jazz bands. It has performed with many foreign ensembles, the most notable of which is the United States Air Forces in Europe Band. It previously participated in the Cape Town Military Tattoo in 2010. The members of Urban Boyz (a Rwandan Afropop group) and the army jazz band performed at the official opening ceremony of a military games in 2017.

== Military Band Basic Music Courses ==
The regiment runs the Military Band Basic Music Courses at Kanombe Military Barracks. The courses include the following:

- Basic Music Course
- Drum Major’s Course
- Ceremonial Drills Course
- Duties Instructors Course

== See also ==
- Kenya Army Band
- Bands of the Uganda People's Defence Force
