= Military ranks of Rwanda =

The Military ranks of Rwanda are the military insignia used by the Rwandan Defence Forces. Rwanda is a landlocked country, and does therefore not possess a navy.

== Commissioned officer ranks ==
The rank insignia for commissioned officers.

Rank group	General / flag officers				Senior officers			Junior officers
Rwandan Land Forces
Rwandan Land Forces	General	Lieutenant general	Major general	Brigadier general	Colonel	Lieutenant colonel	Major	Captain	Lieutenant	Second lieutenant
Rwandan Air Force
Rwandan Air Force	General	Lieutenant general	Major general	Brigadier general	Colonel	Lieutenant colonel	Major	Captain	Lieutenant	Second lieutenant
Rank group	General / flag officers				Senior officers			Junior officers

== Other ranks ==
The rank insignia for NCOs and enlisted personnel.

Rank group	Senior NCOs					Junior NCOs	Enlisted
Rwandan Land Forces							No insignia
Rwandan Land Forces	Warrant officer I	Warrant officer II	Sergeant major	Staff sergeant	Sergeant	Corporal	Private
Rwandan Air Force							No insignia
Rwandan Air Force	Warrant officer I	Warrant officer II	Sergeant major	Staff sergeant	Sergeant	Corporal	Private
Rank group	Senior NCOs					Junior NCOs	Enlisted

== Former ranks ==
Rank group	Senior NCOs					Junior NCOs	Enlisted
Rwandan Land Forces (Unknown―2023)							No insignia
Rwandan Land Forces (Unknown―2023)	Warrant officer I	Warrant officer II	Sergeant major	Staff sergeant	Sergeant	Corporal	Private
Rwandan Air Force (Unknown―2023)							No insignia
Rwandan Air Force (Unknown―2023)	Warrant officer I	Warrant officer II	Sergeant major	Staff sergeant	Sergeant	Corporal	Private
