= Resistance Patriots of Dongo =

The Resistance Patriots of Dongo (French: Patriotes résistants de Dongo) was a possible rebel group in the Democratic Republic of the Congo during the Dongo conflict (October–December 2009). Its existence is disputed.

The group was believed to operate in Dongo, a small town in the north-west Democratic Republic of the Congo on the border with the Republic of the Congo where ethnic violence flared in October 2009 during a local dispute between Enyele and Monzaya ethnic groups. Tensions came to a head on 30 October 2009 when 47 people were massacred. The violence was allegedly incited by a shaman named Udjani.

Shortly after the initial violence, Ambroise Lobala Mokobe (thought to be a pseudonym for Benjamin Nyambaka) announced the formation of an anti-government rebel group called the Resistance Patriots of Dongo. In a press statement, Lobala accused the Congolese government of Joseph Kabila of being controlled by foreigners, and especially by Rwanda. However, Lobala is believed to be part of the Congolese diaspora and was not actually in Dongo. His rebel group is thus generally regarded as an opportunistic, largely fictional creation.
