= Rwanda Rwacu =

1962–2002 national anthem of Rwanda

Rwanda Rwacu Notre Rwanda
English: Our Rwanda
- Former national anthem of Rwanda
- Lyrics: Abanyuramatwi and Michael Habarurema, 1962
- Music: Abanyuramatwi and Michael Habarurema, 1960
- Adopted: 1962
- Relinquished: January 1, 2002
- Succeeded by: "Rwanda Nziza"

Audio sample
- Instrumental rendition: file; help

"Rwanda Rwacu" (Kinyarwanda: [ɾɡwɑːndɑ ɾɡwɑtʃu], French: "Notre Rwanda", lit. '"Our Rwanda"') was the national anthem of Rwanda from 1962 to January 1, 2002, when it was replaced with "Rwanda Nziza".

== History ==
As mentioned earlier, this anthem was adopted in 1962. It was replaced on January 1, 2002, 8 years after the Rwandan genocide.

== Lyrics ==
| Kinyarwanda lyrics | French lyrics | English translation |
|---|---|---|
| Rwanda rwacu, Rwanda gihugu cyambyaye, Ndakuratana ishyaka n'ubutwali. Iyo nibutse ibigwi wagize kugeza ubu, Nshimira Abarwanashyaka bazanye Repubulika idahinyuka. Bavandimwe b'uru Rwanda rwacu twese Nimuhaguruke, Turubumbatire mu mahoro, mu kuri, Mu bwigenge no mu bwumvikane. Impundu ni zivuge mu Rwanda hose, Repubulika yakuye ubuhake, Ubukolonize bwagiye nk'ifuni iheze. Shinga umuzi Demokarasi Waduhaye kwitorera abategetsi. Banyarwanda: abakuru Namwe abato mwizihiye u Rwanda, Turubumbatire mu mahoro, mu kuri, Mu bwigenge no mu bwumvikane. Bavukarwanda mwese muvuze impundu, Demokarasi yarwo iraganje. Twayiharaniye rwose twese uko tungana. Gatutsi, Gatwa na Gahutu Namwe Banyarwanda bandi mwabyiyemeje, Indepandansi twatsindiye Twese hamwe tuyishyikire, Turubumbatire mu mahoro, mu kuri, Mu bwigenge no mu bwumvikane. Nimuze dusingize Ibendera ryacu. Arakabaho na Perezida wacu. Barakabaho abaturage b'iki Gihugu. Intego yacu Banyarwanda Twishyire kandi twizane mu Rwanda rwacu. Twese hamwe, twunge ubumwe Nta mususu dutere imbere ko, Turubumbatire mu mahoro, mu kuri, Mu bwigenge no mu bwumvikane. | Mon Rwanda, terre qui m'a donné naissance, Sans peur, sans relâche, je me vante de toi! Quand je me souviens de vos réalisations à ce jour, Je félicite les pionniers qui ont amené notre république inébranlable. Frères tous, fils de ce Rwanda qui est le nôtre, Viens, levez-vous tous, Chérissons-la en paix et en vérité, En liberté et en harmonie! Que les tambours de victoire battent dans tout le Rwanda! La République a balayé la servitude féodale. Le colonialisme s'est estompé comme une chaussure usée. Démocratie, prenez racine! Grâce à vous, nous avons choisi nos propres dirigeants. Peuple rwandais, vieux et jeune, citoyens tous, Chérissons-la en paix et en vérité, En liberté et en harmonie! Tous les Rwandais nés dans le pays battent les tambours de la victoire! La démocratie a triomphé dans notre pays. Nous tous ensemble, nous nous sommes efforcés d'y parvenir. Ensemble, nous l'avons décrété - Tutsi, Twa, Hutu, avec d'autres éléments raciaux, Notre indépendance durement acquise, Joignons-nous tous pour le construire! Chérissons-le en paix et en vérité, En liberté et en harmonie! Venez, exaltons notre drapeau! Vive notre Président, vive les citoyens de notre terre! Que tel soit notre objectif, peuple du Rwanda: Être autonome, de notre propre chef, par nos propres moyens. Promouvons l'unité et bannissons la peur. Avançons ensemble au Rwanda. Chérissons-la en paix et en vérité, En liberté et en harmonie! | My Rwanda, land that gave me birth, Fearlessly, tirelessly, I boast of you! When I recall your achievements to this very day, I praise the pioneers who have brought in our unshakeable Republic. Brothers all, sons of this Rwanda of ours, Come, rise up all of you, Let us cherish her in peace and in truth, In freedom and in harmony! Let the victory drums beat throughout all Rwanda! The Republic has swept away feudal bondage. Colonialism has faded away like a worn-out shoe. Democracy, take root! Through you we have chosen our own rulers. People of Rwanda, old and young, citizens all, Let us cherish her in peace and in truth, In freedom and in harmony! Home-born Rwandans all, beat the victory drums! Democracy has triumphed in our land. All of us together we have striven for it arduously. Together we have decreed it — Tutsi, Twa, Hutu, with other racial elements (Rwandans), This hard-won Independence of ours, Let us all join to build it up! Let us cherish it in peace and in truth, In freedom and in harmony! Come let us extol our Flag! Long live our President, long live the citizens of our land! Let this be our aim, people of Rwanda: To stand on our own feet, in our own right, by our own means. Let us promote unity and banish fear. Let us go forward together in Rwanda. Let us cherish her in peace and in truth, In freedom and in harmony! |
