= Liberation Day (Rwanda) =

Public holiday in Rwanda

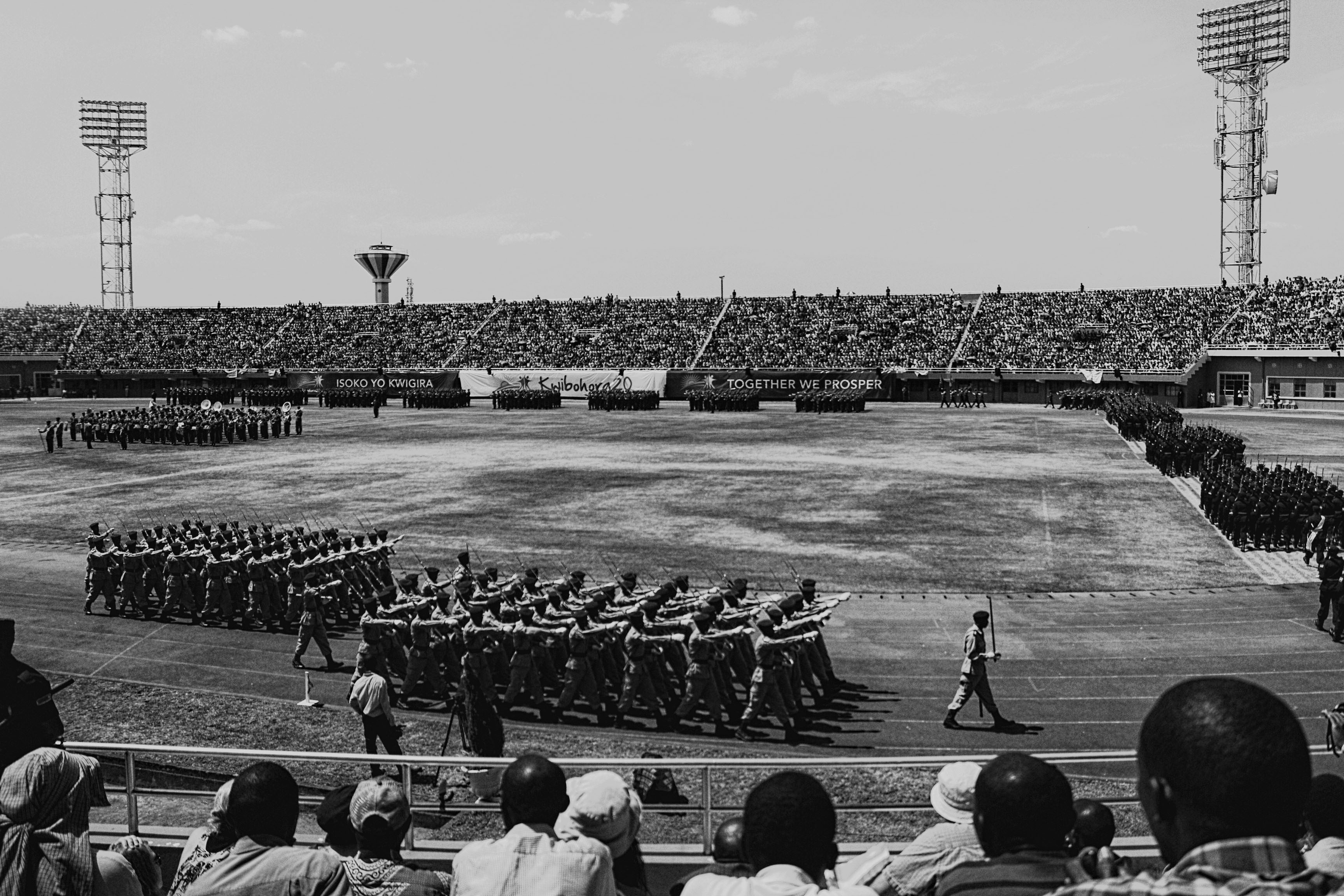
The military parade of the RDF during the Liberation Day celebrations in 2014.

Liberation Day (known locally as Kwibohora) is a public holiday in Rwanda which is celebrated on 4 July. It commemorates the defeat and downfall of the Hutu-led regime in Rwanda by the Rwandan Patriotic Front (RPF) in the Rwandan Civil War, thus ending the Rwandan genocide. On 4 July 1994, the RPF secured the capital of Kigali while the end of the war only became official on 18 July with the liberation of northwestern Rwanda. Liberation Day takes place a week after Independence Day, although it is more of a celebration rather than the national mourning period for the Rwandan Revolution on Independence Day.

== Background history ==
The Rwandan Civil War was a conflict between the Rwandan Armed Forces, representing the government of Rwanda, and the rebel Rwandan Patriotic Front (RPF). The war, which lasted from 1990 to 1994, arose from the long-running dispute between the Hutu and Tutsi groups within the Rwandan population. The war began on 1 October 1990 when the RPF invaded north-eastern Rwanda, advancing 60 km (37 mi) into the country. After the signing of the Arusha Accords in August 1993, an uneasy peace followed, during which its terms were implemented gradually, with peace-keeping United Nations Assistance Mission for Rwanda being sent to the country to implement it. This was sidetracked following the assassination of President Habyarimana on 6 April 1994, after which 500,000 to 700,000 Tutsi were killed in the Genocide against the Tutsi, escalating the war. After months of war, the RPF, under Paul Kagame at this time, spent the latter half of June fighting to liberate the capital. The RPF finally defeated the Rwandan Army and liberated Kigali on 4 July. The RPF declared victory, with Paul Kagame being named as the new leader. 4 July was immediately designated by the new government as Liberation Day.

== Commemorations ==
On Liberation Day, many government sponsored patriotic and cultural events, including special ceremonies, and concerts are organized. Across the country, there are celebrations of the liberation anniversary, with the main celebrations taking place in Kigali, the Rwandan capital. Delegations from all over the continent visit the capital to attend the celebrations. The annual military parade of the Rwanda Defence Force is held at Amahoro Stadium. During this event, the President of Rwanda receives the general salute (Rwanda Nziza) and addresses the nation. Following the address, the RDF Army Band performs an exhibition drill routine before the audience. The parade is led by the RDF color guard and a massed colors contingent. In recent years, the normal horizontal goose step performed at parades was replaced with a more Chinese style goose step as the troops participating were trained by the Chinese People's Liberation Army. There is also an official state reception and a holiday football game between Rwanda and neighboring Uganda.

Major Liberation Day anniversaries:

- 10th anniversary (2004)
- 20th anniversary (2014)
- Silver Jubilee (2019)

In 2019, official celebrations of the holiday took place in Zimbabwe for the first time. In 2020, Rwanda celebrated the 26th anniversary of liberation amid the COVID-19 pandemic by inaugurating several development projects on the border with Uganda.
