= Rwanda Nziza =

National anthem of Rwanda

English: Beautiful Rwanda
- National anthem of Rwanda
- Lyrics: Faustin Murigo, 1990s
- Music: Jean-Bosco Hashakaimana
- Adopted: 1 January 2002
- Preceded by: "Rwanda Rwacu"

Audio sample
- U.S. Navy Band instrumental version: file; help

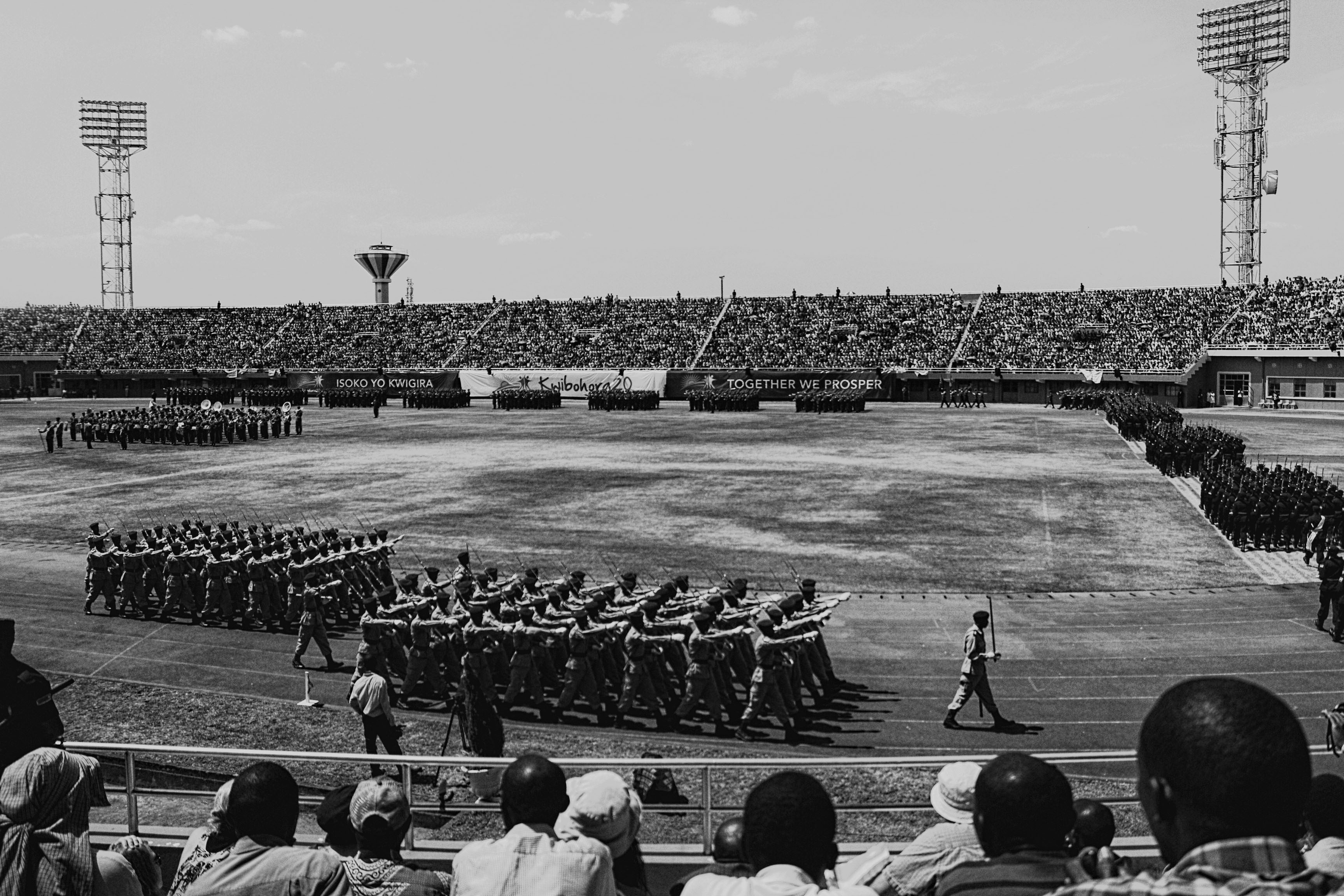
Military parade by the Rwandan Defence Forces at Amahoro Stadium, performing "Rwanda Nziza", 2014

"Rwanda Nziza" (Kinyarwanda: [ɾɡwɑː.ndɑ nzǐː.zɑ], "Beautiful Rwanda") has been the national anthem of Rwanda since 1 January 2002. It replaced "Rwanda Rwacu", the original national anthem, eight years after the 1994 Rwandan genocide.

== Background ==
Rwanda's original national anthem, written when the country achieved independence from Belgium in 1962, was called "Rwanda Rwacu" ("Our Rwanda"). Independence was achieved at a time of high tension, following the Rwandan Revolution: centuries of rule by the minority Tutsi group had been overturned in just three years, the majority Hutu taking power in a violent upheaval, and forcing more than 100,000 to seek refuge in neighbouring countries. The subsequent thirty years, under the presidencies of Grégoire Kayibanda and Juvénal Habyarimana, were marked by continued cycles of violence, culminating in the 1990s with the launch of the Rwandan Civil War by exiled Tutsi led by Paul Kagame, the assassination of President Habyarimana, and the 1994 Rwandan genocide.

The genocide was ended when Kagame's rebel army took control of the country in July 1994. A period of "reconciliation" began, as a unity government took control of the country. Kagame was the de facto leader from this point on, and assumed the presidency in 2000. As part of this effort, and ostensibly to signal a break with the country's violent past, the government enacted an overhaul of the country's symbols, including the flag, the coat of arms and the national anthem. However, some Rwandans at the time expressed doubts about the stated reasoning and merely viewed all this as an attempt by the ruling Rwandan Patriotic Front to assert its political power by changing established state symbols.

== History ==
To commission the lyrics and music for the new state anthem, the government organized a national contest. "Rwanda Nziza" represented the winning entry, with lyrics composed by Faustin Murigo of Karubanda prison, and melody by Captain Jean-Bosco Hashakaimana of the Rwandan army brass band. "Rwanda Nziza" became the official anthem of Rwanda on 1 January 2002.

== Lyrics ==
Kinyarwanda lyrics

I
Rwanda nziza Gihugu cyacu
Wuje imisozi, ibiyaga n'ibirunga
Ngobyi iduhetse gahorane ishya.
Reka tukurate tukuvuge ibigwi
Wowe utubumbiye hamwe twese
Abanyarwanda uko watubyaye
Berwa, sugira, singizwa iteka.

II
Horana Imana, murage mwiza
Ibyo tugukesha ntibishyikirwa;
Umuco dusangiye uraturanga
Ururimi rwacu rukaduhuza
Ubwenge, umutima, amaboko yacu
Nibigukungahaze bikwiye
Nuko utere imbere ubutitsa.

III
Abakurambere b'intwari
Bitanze batizigama
Baraguhanga uvamo ubukombe
Utsinda ubukoroni na mpatsibihugu
Byayogoje Afurika yose
None uraganje mu bwigenge
Tubukomeyeho uko turi twese.

IV
Komeza imihigo Rwanda dukunda
Duhagurukiye kukwitangira
Ngo amahoro asabe mu bagutuye
Wishyire wizane muri byose
Urangwe n'ishyaka, utere imbere
Uhamye umubano n'amahanga yose
Maze ijabo ryawe riguhe ijambo.

IPA transcription (Note: See Help:IPA and Kinyarwanda § Phonology.)

1
[ɾɡwaː.nda nziː.zá ɟi.hú.gu caː.t͡ʃu]
[wu.ʒ‿i.mi.só.zi i.βi.já.ga ni.βi.ɾuː.ŋga]
[ŋgo.bɟ‿i.dú.heː.t͡se gá.ho.ɾa.n‿i.çá]
[ɾe.ka tu.ku.ɾaː.te tu.ku.vú.g‿i.βi.gwí]
[wo.w‿u.tu.βuː.mbi.je há.mŋe tkwéː.s‿]
[‿a.βa.ɲa.ɾɡwaː.nd‿u.kó wa.tu.bɟáː.je]
[beː.ɾɡwa su.ɟi.ɾá si.ŋɟi.zɡw‿i.téː.ká]

2
[ho.ɾa.n‿i.máː.na mu.ɾa.ɟe mŋiː.za]
[i.bɟo tu.gu.céː.ʃa nhi.βi.çi.ciː.ɾɡwa]
[u.mu.t͡ʃó du.saː.ŋɟi.j‿u.ɾa.tu.ɾaː.ŋga]
[u.ɾu.ɾí.mi ɾɡwaː.t͡ʃu ɾu.ka.du.huː.za]
[u.bɡéː.ŋɟ‿u.mu.tí.m‿a.ma.βó.ko jaː.t͡ʃu]
[ni.βi.gu.kúː.ŋga.ha.ze‿βi.kwiː.je]
[nuː.k‿u.téː.ɾ‿i.mbe.ɾ‿u.βu.tiː.t͡sa]

3
[a.βa.kú.ɾaː.mbe.ɾe‿βi.nhwáː.ɾi‿]
[‿βi.taː.nze‿βa.ti.zí.ga.ma]
[ba.ɾa.gu.haː.ŋg‿u.vá.m‿u.βu.koː.mbe]
[u.t͡siː.nd‿u.βu.kó.ɾo.ni na mha.t͡si.βi.hú.gu]
[bɟáː.jo.go.ʒ‿a.fu.ɾi.ká jóː.se]
[nóː.n‿u.ɾa.gaː.nʒe mu bɡí.ɟeː.ŋɟe]
[tu.βu.ko.me.je.h‿u.kó tu.ɾi tkwéː.se]

4
[ko.me.z‿i.mi.hi.gó ɾɡwaː.nda du.kuː.nda]
[du.ha.gu.ɾu.ci.je ku.kwí.taː.ŋɟi.ɾa]
[ŋgo̯‿a.ma.hó.ɾ‿a.sa.βe mu‿βa.gu.túː.je]
[wiː.çí.ɾe wiː.zá.ne mu.ɾi bɟóː.se]
[u.ɾaː.ŋgwe ni.ça.k‿u.teː.ɾ‿i.mbe.ɾe]
[u.há.mɲ‿u.mu.βáː.no na.ma.háː.ŋga jóː.se]
[ma.z‿i.ʒa.βo ɾɟaː.we ɾi.gu.h‿i.ʒaː.mbo]

Swahili lyrics

I
Rwanda, nchi yetu nzuri na yenye
kupendwa na milima, maziwa na volkano
Nchi ya Mama, ingejazwa furaha kila wakati
Sisi watoto wako wote: Abanyarwanda
Wacha tuimbe mng'ao wako na tutangaze ukweli wako wa hali ya juu
Wewe, kifua cha mama yetu sisi sote
Ungeweza kupendwa milele, mafanikio na funika sifa.

II
Urithi wenye thamani, kwamba Mungu analinda kwako
Ulijaza sisi bidhaa zenye bei kubwa
Tamaduni yetu ya kawaida hututambulisha
Lugha yetu moja inatuunganisha Kwamba akili zetu,
dhamiri zetu na vikosi vyetu Kukujaza utajiri anuwai
Kwa maendeleo yasiyokoma tena.

III
Wazee wetu wenye nguvu
Walijitolea miili na roho
mbali na kukufanya wewe kuwa taifa kubwa
Ulishinda nira ya ukoloni-ubeberu ambayo imeharibu
Afrika kabisa na furaha yako ya uhuru wako
huru imepatikana ambayo kila mara tutatetea.

IV
Kudumisha hii Cape, Mpendwa Rwanda,
Kudumu, tunajitolea kwa ajili yako Ili amani itawale nchi nzima
Kwamba uko huru na kizuizi chochote
Kwamba uamuzi wako unakodisha maendeleo
Kwamba una uhusiano mzuri na nchi zote
Na kwamba hatimaye kiburi chako kinastahili heshima yako.

French lyrics

I
Rwanda, notre beau et cher pays
Paré de collines, de lacs et de volcans
Mère-patrie, sois toujours comblée de bonheur
Nous tous tes enfants: les Rwandais
Chantons ton éclat et proclamons tes hauts faits
Toi, Giron maternel de nous tous
Sois à jamais admiré, prospère et couvert d’éloges.

II
Précieux héritage, que Dieu te protège
Tu nous as comblés de biens inestimables
Notre culture commune nous identifie
Notre unique langue nous unifie
Que notre intelligence, notre conscience et nos forces
Te comblent de richesses diversifiées
Pour un développement sans cesse renouvelé.

III
Nos valeureux aïeux
Se sont donnés corps et âmes
Jusqu’à faire de toi une grande Nation
Tu as eu raison du joug colonialo-impérialiste
Qui a dévasté l’Afrique tout entière
Et te voici aise de ton indépendance souveraine
Acquis que sans cesse nous défendrons.

IV
Maintiens ce cap, Rwanda bien-aimé
Debout, nous nous engageons pour toi
Afin que la paix règne dans tout le pays
Que tu sois libre de toute entrave
Que ta détermination engage le progrès
Qu’excellent tes relations avec tous les pays
Et qu’enfin ta fierté te vaille estime.

English translation

I
Rwanda, our beautiful and dear country
Adorned of hills, lakes and volcanoes
Motherland, would be always filled of happiness
Us all your children: Abanyarwanda
Let us sing your glare and proclaim your high facts
You, maternal bosom of us all
Would be admired forever, prosperous and cover of praises.

II
Invaluable heritage, that God protects to you
You filled us priceless goods
Our common culture identifies us
Our single language unifies us
That our intelligence, our conscience and our forces
Fill you with varied riches
For an unceasingly renewed development.

III
Our valorous ancestors
Gave themselves bodies and souls
As far as making you a big nation
You overcame the colonial-imperialistic yoke
That has devastated Africa entirely
And has your joy of your sovereign independence
Acquired that constantly we will defend.

IV
Maintain this cape, beloved Rwanda,
Standing, we commit for you
So that peace reigns countrywide
That you are free of all hindrance
That your determination hires progress
That you have excellent relations with all countries
And that finally your pride is worth your esteem.
