= Rwandan Air Force =

- Force Aérienne Rwandaise
- Rwanda Air Force Roundel
- Founded: 1962; 63 years ago
- Country: Rwanda
- Type: Air force
- Role: Aerial warfare
- Size: 1,000 personnel
- Part of: Rwanda Defence Force

Commanders
- President of Rwanda: Paul Kagame
- Air Force Chief of Staff: Lt Gen Jean-Jacques Mupenzi

Insignia
- Roundel

Aircraft flown
- Attack helicopter: Mil Mi-24
- Utility helicopter: Mil Mi-17
- Transport: Cessna 208 Caravan, Diamond DA42 Twin Star

The Rwandan Air Force (French: Force aérienne rwandaise) is the air branch of the Rwandan Defence Forces.

== History ==
After achieving independence in 1962, the Air Force was formed with the aid of Belgium, the initial aircraft consisted of three ex-French Air Force CM.170 Magisters, which operated in a counterinsurgency role along with a Britten-Norman Islander. Other deliveries included SA 342L Gazelles, Nord Noratlas, SOCATA Guerrier, and C-47 Skytrains. During the Rwandan Civil War, most of the aircraft were either shot down, destroyed on the ground or crashed.

== Inventory ==
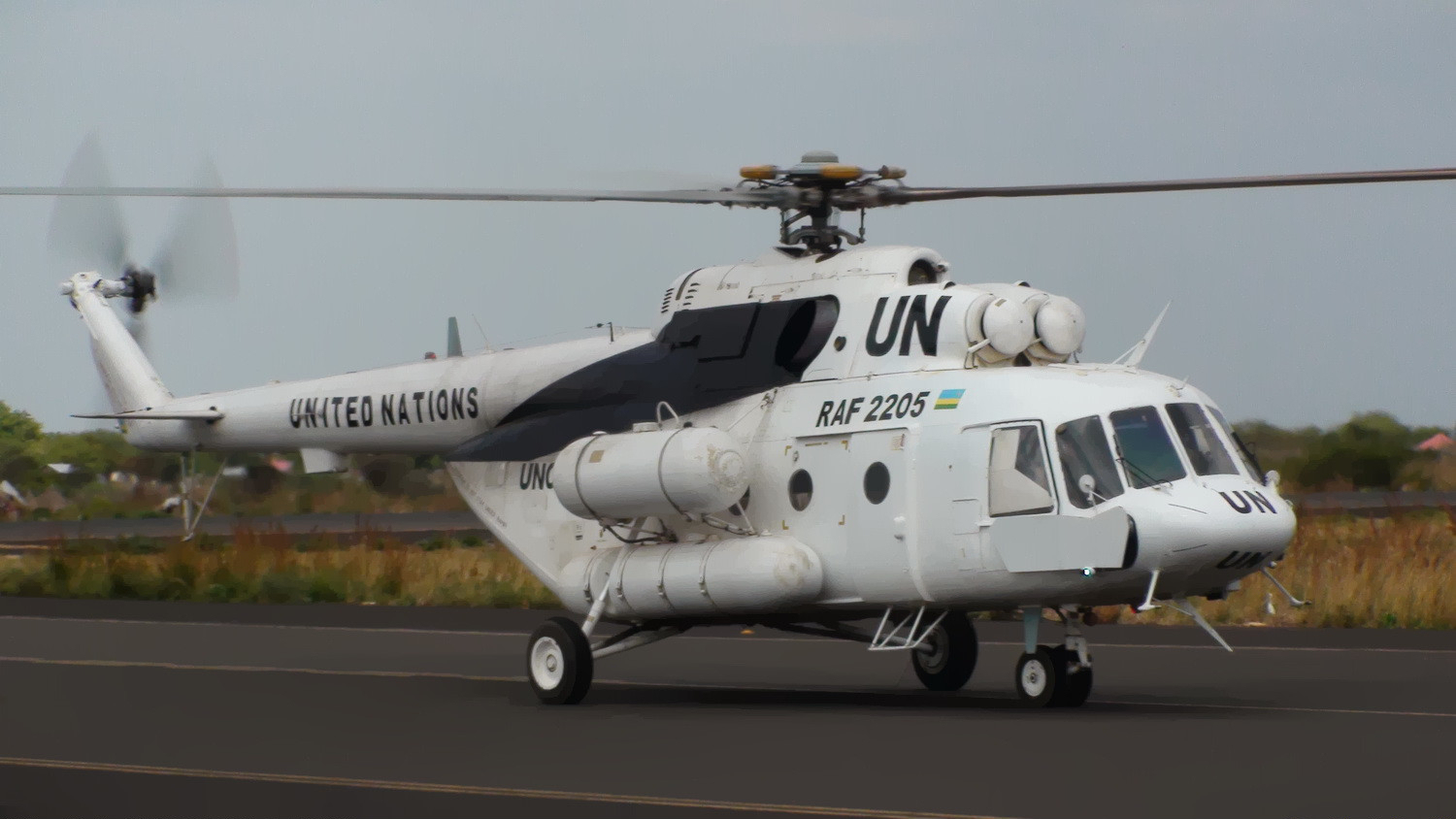
A Rwandan Air Force Mil Mi-17

| Aircraft | Origin | Type | Variant | In service | Notes |
Transport
| Cessna 208 Caravan | United States | Utility | | 2 | |
| Diamond DA42 | Austria | Utility | | 2 | |
Helicopters
| Mil Mi-17 | Soviet Union / Russia | Utility | | 12 | |
| Mil Mi-24 | Soviet Union / Russia | Attack | Mi-35 | 5 | |
Unmanned aerial vehicle
| Bayraktar TB2 | Turkey | UCAV | | N/A | |
