= Rwandan Defence Force =

Combined military forces of Rwanda

Rwanda Defence Force
- Kinyarwanda: Ingabo z'u Rwanda; French: Forces rwandaises de défense Swahili: Jeshi la Ulinzi la Rwanda
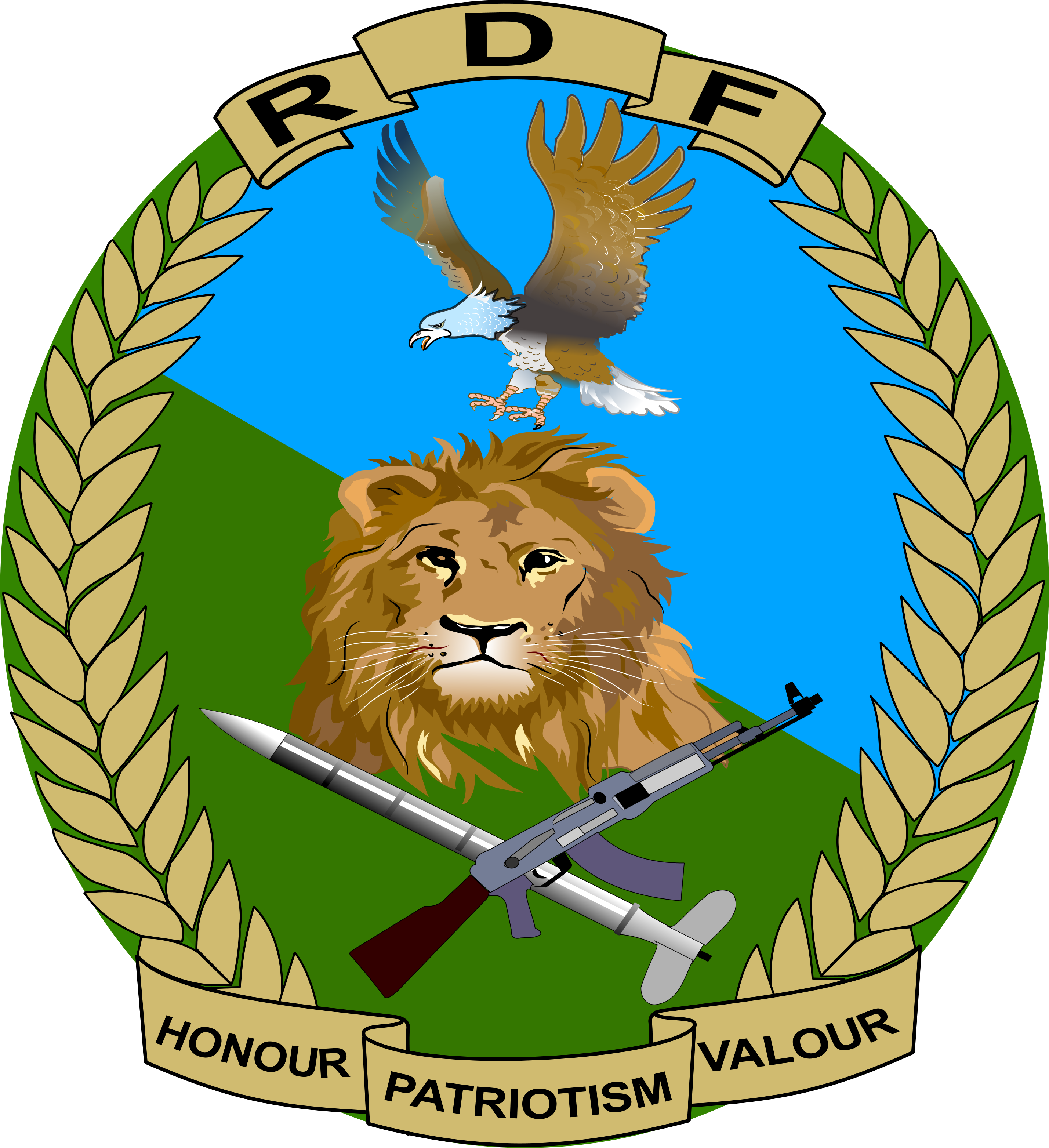
- Motto: Honour Patriotism Valour
- Founded: 1962
- Current form: 1994
- Service branches: Rwandan Land Force; Rwandan Air Force; Rwandan Reserve Force
- Headquarters: Kigali
- Website: Official website

Leadership
- Commander-in-Chief: Paul Kagame
- Minister of Defence: Juvenal Marizamunda
- Chief of Defence Staff: General Mubarak Muganga

Personnel
- Active personnel: 33,000

Expenditure
- Budget: $191 million (2025)
- Percent of GDP: 4% (2025)

Industry
- Domestic suppliers: REMCO
- Foreign suppliers: Brazil; China; European Union; France; Indonesia; Israel; Poland; South Africa; Serbia; Turkey; Russia; Vietnam; United Kingdom Formerly: Belgium

Related articles
- History: Bugesera invasion; Rwandan Civil War; Kibeho Massacre; First Congo War; Second Congo War; Six-Day War (2000); Dongo conflict; Kivu conflict; 2009 Eastern Congo offensive; M23 campaign (2022–present); Democratic Republic of the Congo–Rwanda conflict; Insurgency in Cabo Delgado
- Ranks: Military ranks of Rwanda

The Rwandan Defence Force (RDF, Kinyarwanda: Ingabo z'u Rwanda, French: Forces rwandaises de défense, Swahili: Nguvu ya Ulinzi ya Watu wa Rwanda) is the military of Rwanda. Prior to 1994, Rwanda's military was officially known as the Rwandan Armed Forces (FAR), but following the Rwandan Civil War and the Rwandan genocide, the Rwandan Patriotic Front (RPF) renamed it the Rwandan Patriotic Army (RPA), which was the military wing of the RPF. In late 1994, the military was rebuilt and reorganized as the Rwandan Defence Force (RDF).

The RDF is organized into three service branches: Rwandan Land Force, Rwandan Air Force and Rwandan Reserve Force. After the RPF conquered the country in July 1994 in the aftermath of the Rwandan genocide, the RPF decided to reform solely as Rwanda's ruling political party and separate from its military wing, where the latter would serve as the country's official military.

Defence spending continues to represent an important share of the national budget, largely due to continuing security problems along Rwanda's frontiers with the Democratic Republic of the Congo and Burundi, and lingering concerns about Uganda's intentions towards its former ally.

The RDF has been engaged in a low-level insurgency from Rwandan rebels based in eastern Congo, primarily the Democratic Forces for the Liberation of Rwanda (FDLR), since the late 1990s. The RDF is regularly deployed in peacekeeping missions in Africa, as Rwanda is currently one of the largest contributors of personnel on UN missions.

== Independence and early history (1960–1994) ==
While Rwanda was a Belgian colony administered as a part of Ruanda-Urundi, its security was provided by the Force Publique, the colonial army of the Belgian Congo. As the Congo was due to achieve independence in 1960 and withdraw its forces, the Belgian Special Resident decided to create an indigenous army to provide for Rwanda's security. On 19 May 1960, he ordered the recruitment of a 650-strong military force to become the Garde Territoriale. The force was later renamed the Garde Nationale. The U.S. Army's Area Handbook for Rwanda, compiled in 1968–9, describes the security forces of Rwanda in 1969 as the 2,500 strong National Guard and the National Police, about 1,200 strong.

The Rwandan Armed Forces (FAR) was the national army of Rwanda until July 1994, when the government collapsed in the aftermath of the Genocide against the Tutsi and the war with the Rwandan Patriotic Front. The FAR was estimated at 7,000 strong, including approximately 1,200 members of the Gendarmerie. Elite troops included the Presidential Guard, estimated at between 1,000 and 1,300 troops, as well as the Paracommando and Reconnaissance units. These two units were of battalion strength by 1994, and then counted a total of 800 troops.

In response to the RPF invasion of 1990, the 5,000-man FAR rapidly expanded, with French training assistance (as many as 1,100 French troops were in Rwanda at a time), to some 30,000 by 1992.

The Arusha Accords, signed on 4 August 1993, laid out a detailed plan for the integration of the Rwandan Government and Rwandan Patriotic Front military forces. The Rwandan government was to provide 60% of the troops for the new integrated army, but would have to share command positions with the RPF down to the level of battalion. The new army was to consist of no more than 19,000 soldiers and 6,000 Gendarmerie. However radical elements within the Rwandan government were implacably opposed to implementation of the Accords and, instead, began the planning that would lay the foundations for the genocide.

The Reconnaissance Battalion's commander, François-Xavier Nzuwonemeye, and his subordinates played a key role during the genocide. Together with the Reconnaissance Battalion, the Paracommando Battalion under Major Aloys Ntabakuze and the Presidential Guard under Major Protais Mpiranya became the three most significant genocidare units.

Col. Marcel Gatsinzi was briefly named chief of staff of the Rwandan army from 6 to 16 April 1994, but was replaced by Augustin Bizimungu, who was also promoted to major general on 18 April, since Col. Gatsinzi opposed the genocide. Bizimungu was only briefly chief of staff before fleeing the country. Many soldiers of the FAR have since been implicated by the International Criminal Tribunal for Rwanda in the genocide, including its leader during the genocide, Col. Théoneste Bagosora, who was chief of the cabinet (private office) of the Ministry of Defence prior to the genocide.

Many elements of the former Rwandan regime, including soldiers of the FAR, fled to eastern Zaire after the RPF victory, where they formed the Rassemblement Démocratique pour le Rwanda (RDR), which later became the Democratic Forces for the Liberation of Rwanda (FDLR), which is still active in eastern Congo's North Kivu Province.

== Post-1994 operations ==
=== Second Congo War (1998–2003) ===
Circa 2000 during the Second Congo War, the Rwanda Patriotic Army unofficially admitted to having 4,000 to 8,000 troops deployed in the Congo, according to the Economist Intelligence Unit, but this was believed to be a substantial understatement. The International Crisis Group estimated that the RPA had between 17,000 and 25,000 troops deployed in the Congo. In April 2001, a United Nations report on the exploitation of the Congo, said the RPA had a minimum of 25,000 troops in the Congo, an estimate the report attributes to "military specialists with a great deal of experience in the region." During the deployment in the DRC, Rwandan forces fought the so-called "Six-Day War" against Ugandan forces over the city of Kisangani, leaving at least 1,000 dead.

On 17 September 2002, the first Rwandan soldiers were withdrawn from the eastern DRC. On 5 October Rwanda announced the completion of its withdrawal; MONUC confirmed the departure of over 20,000 Rwandan soldiers.

=== Ongoing insurgency ===
There is an ongoing, low-level insurgency from Rwandan rebels based in the Democratic Republic of the Congo; mainly the Forces démocratiques de libération du Rwanda (or FDLR) During early 2009 the RDF operated in eastern DRC against FDLR rebels in joint operations with the armed forces of the DRC. The initial 2009 deployment was code-named Operation Umoja Wetu. The RDF re-entered the DRC in 2009 to assist the DRC in putting down the Dongo Rebellion. These operations inside the DRC did not prevent cross-border attacks within Rwanda during late 2012, August 2013, December 2018 and December 2019.

There has also been a small number of attacks in southern Rwanda from Burundi-based rebels. These attacks are usually blamed on the National Forces of Liberation (Forces nationales de libération), or FNL. The FNL is the armed wing of an externally-based opposition party: the Rwandan Movement for Democratic Change, or MRCD, which was formed by Paul Rusesabagina and Callixte Nsabimana. Rusesabagina is considered by some to be a hero of the 1994 Rwandan Genocide and his actions are portrayed in the Hollywood film 'Hotel Rwanda'. Rusesabagina and Nsabimana were kidnapped and flown to Kigali, where they were arrested, in September 2020, Rusesabagina was sentenced to 25 years but was later released in 2023 by presidential decree.

The Rwanda National Congress is another opposition group reported by the Kigali Government as carrying out attacks in Rwanda. These include blame for grenade attacks in Rwanda between 2010 and 2014 that killed at least 17 people and injured over 400 others.

=== Mozambique ===
On 9 July 2021, a 1000-strong joint Rwandan military police force started deploying to northern Mozambique to assist the national security forces in combating Islamic extremists. The Joint Task Force was commanded by Maj. Gen. Innocent Kabandana and initially comprised 700 soldiers and 300 police. The Rwandan deployment to Mozambique under a bilateral agreement pre-empted a long-planned Southern African Development Council (SADC) military operation.

The Joint Task Force was soon in action and within the month was reported to have overrun a terrorist base and inflicted casualties. In August 2021 it was reported that the contingent had eliminated 14 insurgents in total. The port town of Mocimboa da Praia was then recaptured from insurgents.

Operations then became more scattered across the northern province, and President Kagame announced in February 2022 that 80% of the enemy occupied Cabo Delgado province had been recaptured since mid-2021. At this time the Rwandan Joint Task Force was commanded by Brig. Gen. P. Muhizi.

The Joint Task Force was reported to have increased to 2,500 personnel in December 2022 and, in January 2023, the commander was Maj. Gen. Eugene Nkubito.

On 4 August 2023, there was a change of command when Maj. Gen. Alexis Kagame assumed command of the Joint Task Force from Maj. Gen Eugene Nkubito and the Task Force Battle Group (TFBG) commander Brig. Gen. F. Mutembe handed over to Col. T. Bahizi, the incoming TFBG 3 Commander.

=== Peacekeeping support operations ===
The RDF has deployed forces on a number of UN and AU-endorsed peacekeeping support operations in Africa. Rwanda is now one of the largest contributors of personnel on UN missions. Deployments include the following:

African Union Mission in Sudan (AMIS): Units were deployed on year-long tours of duty between August 2004 and December 2007. The peak commitment was four battalions.

United Nations Mission in Sudan (UNMIS): In the first ever deployment of Rwandan personnel on a United Nations mission, a small contingent of 254 personnel was deployed for year-long tours between November 2005 and September 2010.

African Union/ United Nations Hybrid Mission to Darfur (UNAMID): This UN mission superseded the AU mission in the Darfur region of Sudan. Infantry battalions have been deployed, for year-long tours, between January 2008 and mid-2020. Starting with a peak deployed strength of four battalions, the numbers had declined by mid-2020 to two battalions.

United Nations Mission in South Sudan (UNMISS): In April 2012 a Rwandan contingent was deployed to this UN mission in the newly independent country of South Sudan. The deployment was continuing in mid-2020, by when an aviation unit, two infantry battalions and a Regional Protection Force battalion were deployed.

AU-led International Support Mission to the CAR (MISCA): This African Union mission to the troubled Central African Republic was joined, between January and September 2014, by a Rwandan mechanised battalion.

United Nations Multidimensional Integrated Stabilization Mission in the Central African Republic (MINUSCA): This UN mission superseded the AU-led mission in the Central African Republic. Rwanda provides a protection battalion in the capital of Bangui, a level two hospital in the town of Bria and, from September 2017, a battle group comprising a mechanised infantry battalion. During August 2021 the Rwandan was expanded again, when a third Rwandan infantry battalion was deployed to the CAR.

== Command ==
The RDF command comprises the following:

- The chief of defense staff: General Mubarakh MUGANGA
- Army Chief of Staff: Maj Gen Vincent NYAKARUNDI
- Air Force Chief of Staff: Lt Gen Jean-Jacques MUPENZI
- Medical Health Service Chief of Staff: Maj Gen Dr Ephrem RURANGWA
- Reserve Force Chief of Staff: Maj Gen Alex KAGAME
- High Command Council of the RDF
- General Staff of the RDF

== Organisation ==
The RDF comprises the Rwanda Army (Land Forces), the Rwanda Air Force (Air Forces), the Military Health Service, the Rwanda Reserve Force and Special Units.

The RDF structure reflects a Joint Headquarters; Commands and Institutions placed directly under the CDS; Service Headquarters and various staff groups.

=== Training establishments ===
Major training centres include:

- RDF Command and Staff College, Nyakinama (Musanze District, Northern Province)
- Rwanda Military Academy, Gako (Bugesera District, Eastern Province)
- School of Infantry (Combat Training Centre), Gabiro
- Basic Military Training Centre (BMTC), Nasho (Kirehe District, Eastern Province)

== Land Forces ==
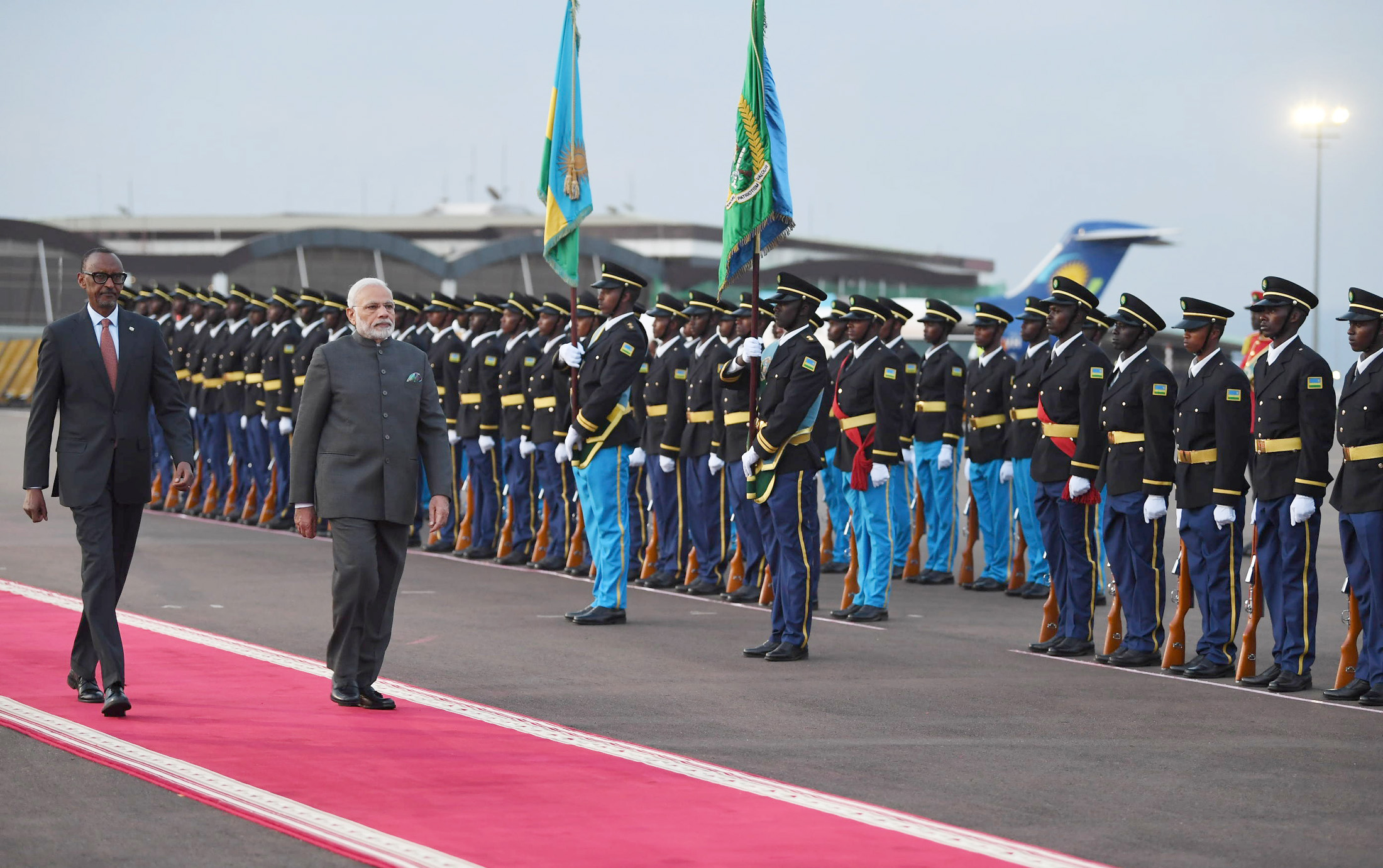
The RDF providing a guard of honour.

Several sources, including Gérard Prunier, document U.S. aid to the RPA before the First Congo War. The officially admitted part of the training was Joint Combined Exchange Training. Prunier strongly implies the United States supplied communications equipment, vehicles, boots, and medicines to the RPA before the war began and after it broke out, delivered second-hand Warsaw Pact weapons and ammunition either directly to Goma or by airdrop along the AFDL front lines. He reports that after the war's outbreak, the U.S. Air Force had switched from using C-141 Starlifters and C-5 Galaxys to deliver the non-lethal aid to Kigali Airport and Entebbe Airport, to airdrops by C-130 Hercules aircraft.

From July 1994 until December 1997 the RPA had six brigades, as designated in the Arusha Accords: 402nd in Kigali and Kigali Rurale Prefecture; 201st in Kibungo, Umutara, and Byumba Prefectures; 301st in Butare, Gikongoro, and Cyangugu Prefectures; 305th in Gitarama and Kibuye Prefectures; and 211th in Gisenyi and Ruhengeri Prefectures. The brigade boundaries mirrored the political administrative boundaries, which often complicated military operations. During the First Congo War the brigade headquarters remained inside Rwanda but directed operations inside the Democratic Republic of the Congo.

Jane's World Armies said in July 2009 that the RDF is deployed to protect the country's borders and defend against external aggression. There are four divisions, each deploying three brigades:

- 1 Division, based at Kigali, covers the central and east region;
- 2 Division, based at Byumba, covers the north and east region;
- 3 Division, based at Gisenyi, covers the northwest region; and
- 4 (Mechanised) Division, based at Butare, covers the southwest region.
- Artillery Division

Brigades reported include:

- Republican Guard Brigade, Kigali
- Special Forces Brigade
- Engineering Brigade
- 201 Brigade, Kibungo
- 204 Brigade, Gasabo District, Kigali
- 211 Brigade, Gisenyi
- 301 Brigade, Butare
- 305 Brigade, Gitatama
- 307 Brigade
- 402 Brigade, Kigali
- 408 Brigade, Rusizi District
- 411 Brigade
- 501 Brigade
- 503 Brigade
- 511 Brigade, Gicumbi District

Many soldiers from the former Rwandan Armed Forces (FAR), the national army under the previous regime, have been incorporated into the RDF since 1994. This process began soon after the genocide in January 1995, when several former FAR officers were given senior positions in the new armed forces: Col. (later Gen.) Marcel Gatsinzi became the Deputy Chief of Staff of the RPA, Col. Balthazar Ndengeyinka became commander of the 305th Brigade, Lt. Col. Laurent Munyakazi took command of the 99th Battalion, and Lt. Col. (later Brig. Gen.) Emmanuel Habyarimana became an RPA Member of Parliament and Director of Training in the Ministry of Defence. Gen. Gatsinzi later became Director of Security and then Minister of Defence in 2002.

== Marine Unit ==
The Rwandan Land Forces also contain a marine unit which operates on Lake Kivu. The unit utilizes several Fabio Buzzi powerboats equipped as fast attack craft, each armed with a single Chinese Type-85 heavy machine gun. In 2021, Rwanda deployed several of the powerboats to operate in littoral waters in the Indian Ocean as part of its deployment to support Mozambique during the Insurgency in Cabo Delgado.

== Air Force ==
Current roundel of Rwanda

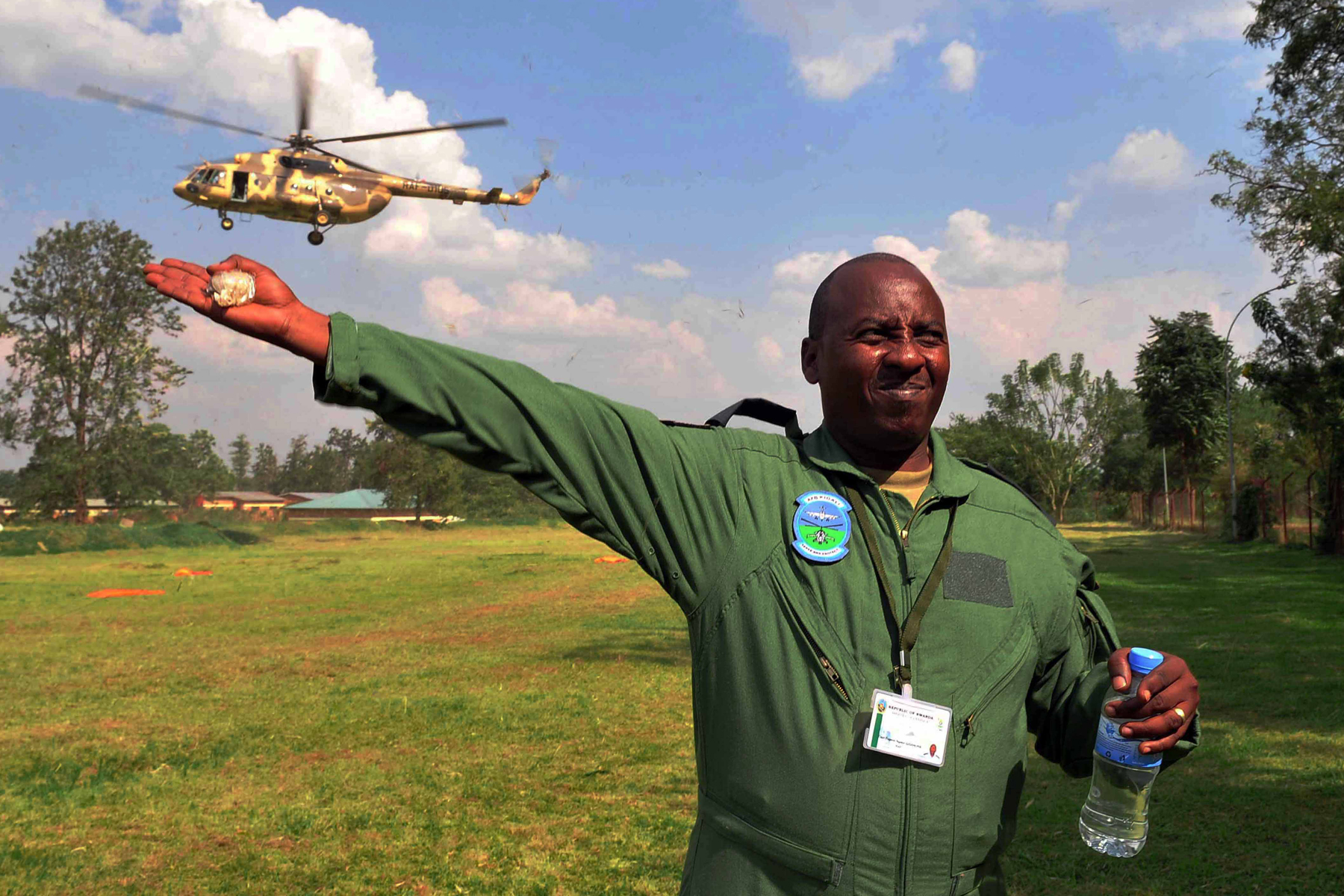
Rwanda Defense Force MEDEVAC skills, January 2011 – Flickr – US Army Africa (6)

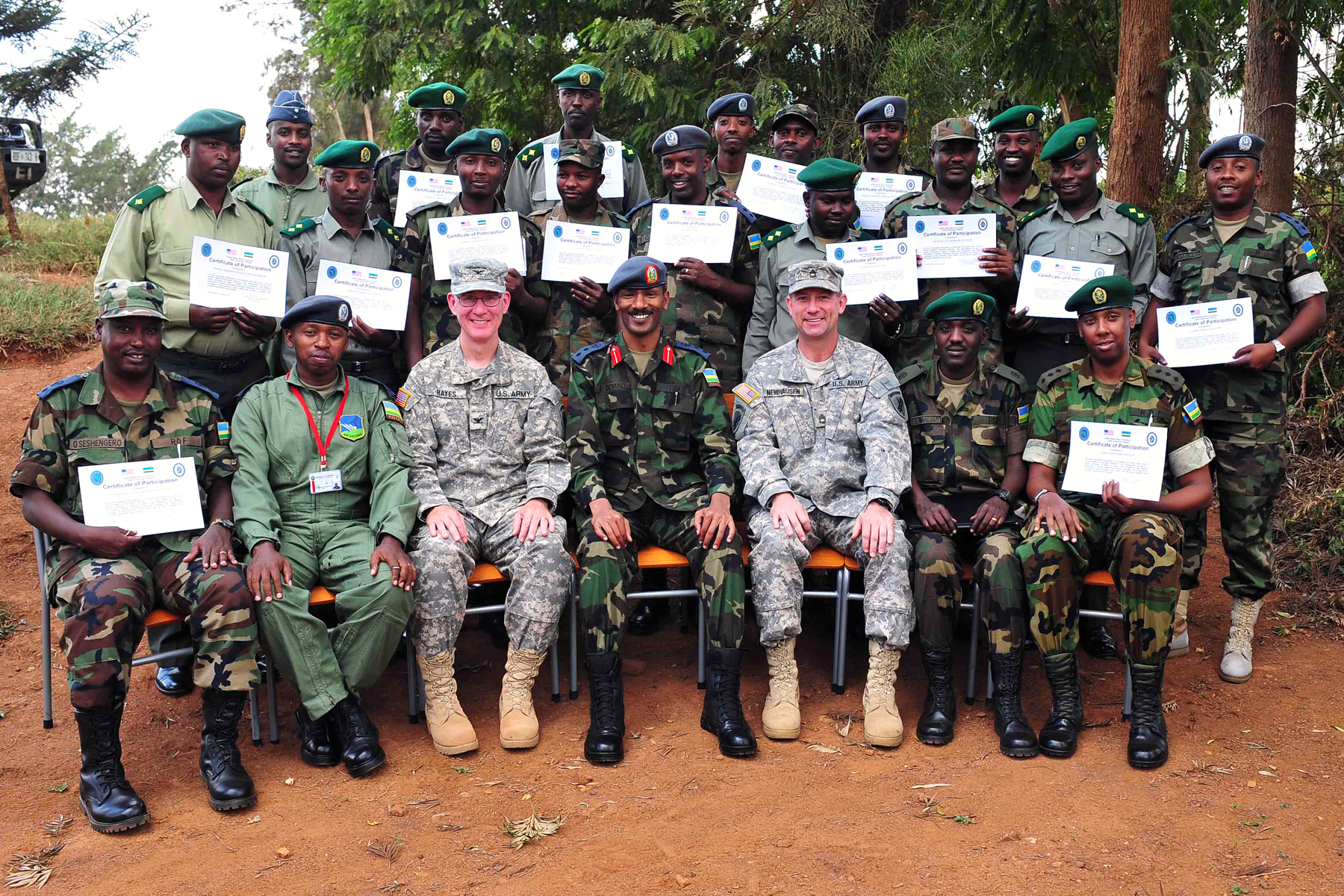
Rwanda Defense Force MEDEVAC skills, January 2011 – Flickr – US Army Africa

After achieving independence in 1962, the air arm (Force aérienne rwandaise) was formed with Belgian help. By 1972 the first modern equipment started to arrive in the form of seven Alouette IIIs. Other deliveries included Aérospatiale Gazelle, Britten-Norman Islanders, Nord Noratlas, SOCATA Guerrier armed light planes and Eurocopter AS350 Écureuil. After fighting began between the RPA and the government in 1990 most aircraft were shot down, destroyed on the ground or crashed. Few survived.

Flight International's World Air Forces 2017 states the Rwandan Air Force has twelve Mil Mi-8/17 helicopters, five Mil Mi-24 and four Aerospatiale Gazelle SA.342.

During December 2012 an aviation unit of three helicopters was sent to the UN Mission in South Sudan (UNMISS). The Rwandan Aviation Unit was subsequently increased to six helicopters – reportedly Mi-17.

=== Aircraft ===
Type	Manufacturer	Origin	Class	Role	In service	Photo
Mi-24	Mil	Soviet Union	Helicopter	Attack	N/A	
Mi-8/17	Mil	Soviet Union	Helicopter	Transport	N/A	
Diamond DA42 Twin Star	Diamond Aircraft Industries	Austria	Utility	Transport	2	
Cessna 208 EX	Cessna	United States	Utility	Transport	2	
Unmanned aerial vehicle
Bayraktar TB2	Baykar	Turkey	Unmanned aerial vehicle	UAV	N/A	

== Equipment ==
=== Armoured fighting vehicles ===
Model	Image	Origin	In service	Notes
Main battle tanks
T-55		Soviet Union	24	
Tiran-5		Soviet Union / Israel	N/A	
Reconnaissance
AML-90		France	N/A	
Infantry fighting vehicle
BMP-1		Soviet Union	N/A	
Ratel-IFV		/ South Africa	N/A	
Armoured personnel carrier
BTR-60		Soviet Union	20	
Panhard M3		France	10	
WZ-551		China	20	
Mine-Resistant ambush protected vehicle
RG-31 Nyala		South Africa; United Kingdom	40	
Infantry mobility vehicle
Cobra		Turkey	N/A	
Cobra II		Turkey	N/A	
Véhicule Blindé Léger		France	N/A	

=== Engineering and maintenance vehicles ===
Model	Image	Origin	In service	Notes
Armoured recovery vehicle
T-54/T-55 ARV		Soviet Union	3	

=== Anti-tank/anti-infrastructure ===
Model	Image	Origin	caliber	In service	Notes
Anti-tank and air-to-surface missile
HJ-9A		China	120mm	N/A	on Cobra

=== Artillery ===
Model	Image	Origin	caliber	In service	Notes
Mortar
L16 81mm mortar		UK	81mm	N/A	
M1938 mortar		Soviet Union	82mm	N/A	
Soltam K6		Israel	120mm	N/A	
Self-propelled howitzer
CS/SH-1		China	122mm	N/A	
Towed howitzer
M101 howitzer		United States	105mm	10	
D-30		Soviet Union	122mm	6	
Type-54		China	152mm	30	
ATMOS 2000		Israel	155mm	N/A	
Multiple rocket launcher
RM-70		Czechoslovakia	122mm	5	
LAR-160		Israel	160mm	N/A	

=== Air defence ===
Name	Image	Origin	caliber	In service	Notes
Surface-to-air missile
9K32 Strela-2		Soviet Union	72mm	N/A	

=== Small arms ===
Name	Type	Origin	Photo	Caliber
Browning Hi-Power	Semi-automatic weapon	Belgium; United States		9mm Parabellum
IMI Uzi	Submachine gun	Israel		9mm Parabellum
CZ Scorpion Evo 3	Submachine gun	Czech Republic		9mm Parabellum
FN FAL	Battle rifle	Belgium		7.62x51mm NATO
AKM	Assault rifle	Soviet Union		7.62x39mm
Vektor R5	Assault rifle	/ South Africa		5.56×45mm NATO
Tavor	Assault rifle	Israel		5.56×45mm NATO
Type 56 assault rifle	Assault rifle	China		7.62x39mm
FB MSBS Grot	Assault rifle	Poland		7.62x39mm
IWI Galil ACE	Assault rifle	Israel		7.62x39mm
Zastava M76	Sniper rifle	Yugoslavia		7.92×57mm Mauser
Vektor SS-77	General purpose machine gun	Republic of South African / South Africa		7.62×51mm NATO
PKM	General purpose machine gun	Soviet Union		7.62×54mmR
M2 Browning	Heavy machine gun	United States		.50 BMG (12.7×99mm NATO)
DShK	Heavy machine gun	Soviet Union		12.7×108mm
RPG-7	Rocket launcher	Soviet Union		

An close up Rwanda Defence Force pixelated camouflage

Rwanda Defence Force pixelated camouflage

Rwandan Defence Force old M81 Woodland BDU

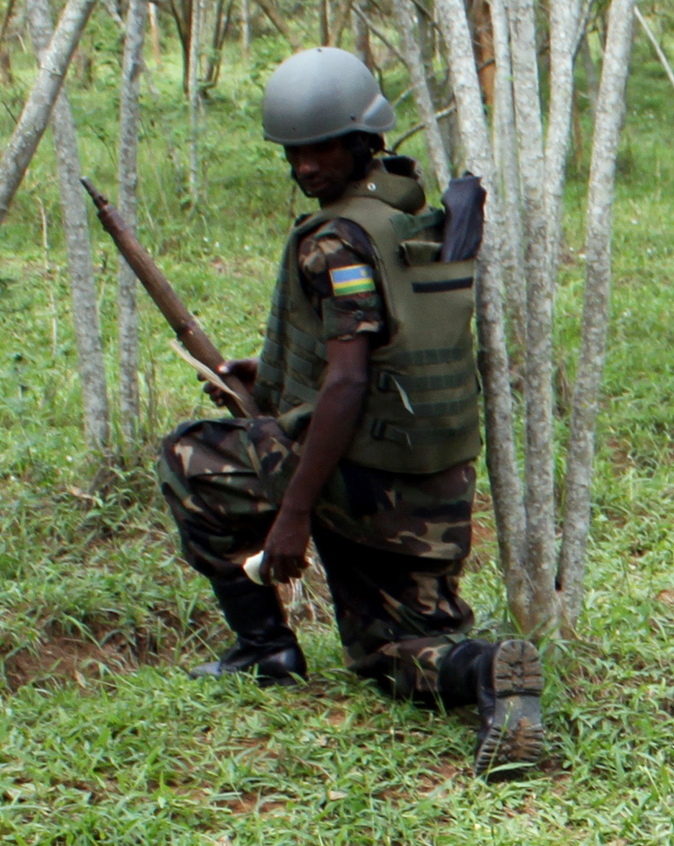
Rwandan Defence Force member equipped with ECH helmet and IBA bulletproof vest

MICH-type Combat Helmet

Rwandan Defence Force Dress Uniform

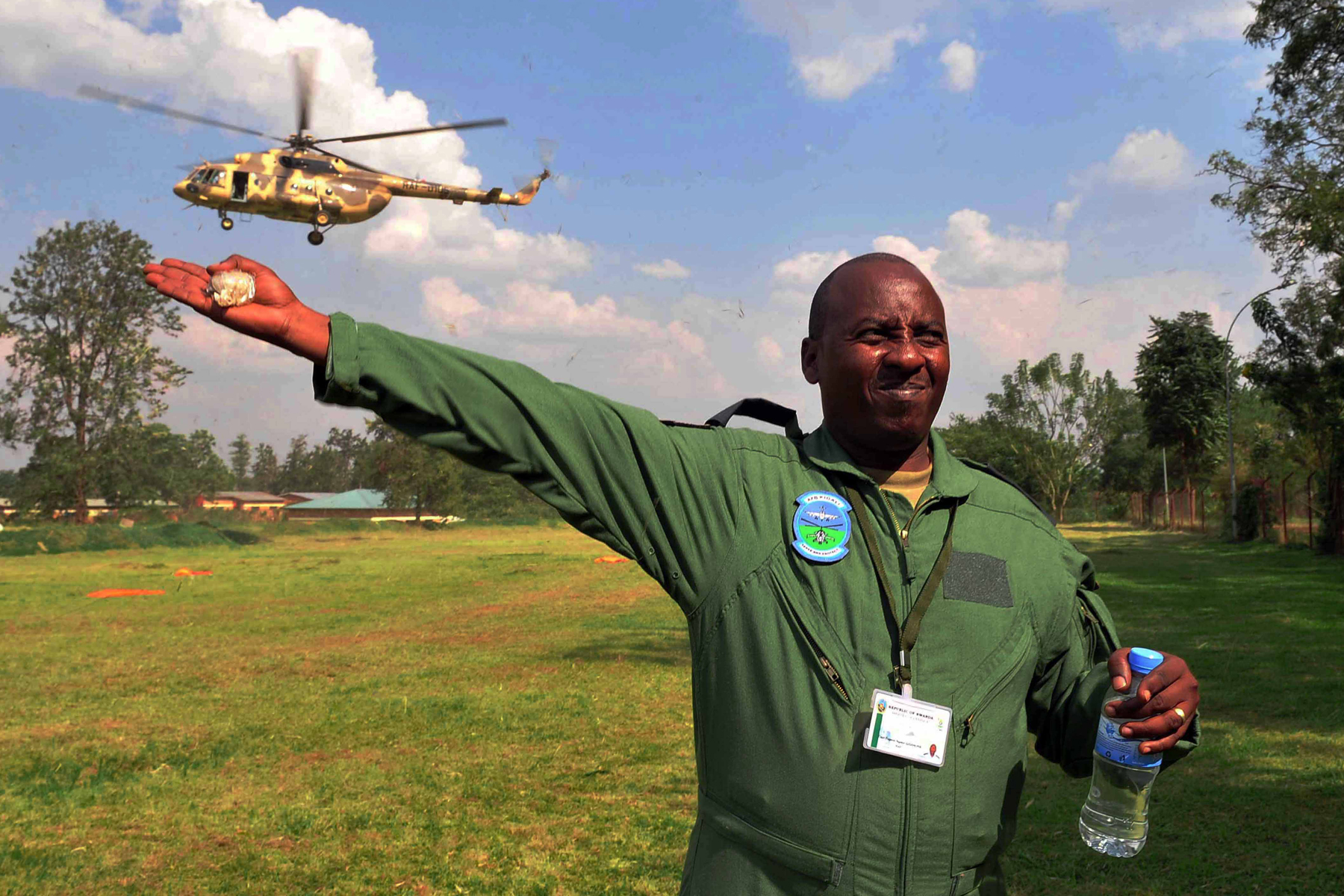
Rwandan Defence Force Pilot Uniform

Uniform and Infantry Equipment of Rwandan Defence Forces

== Characteristics ==
=== Marching style ===
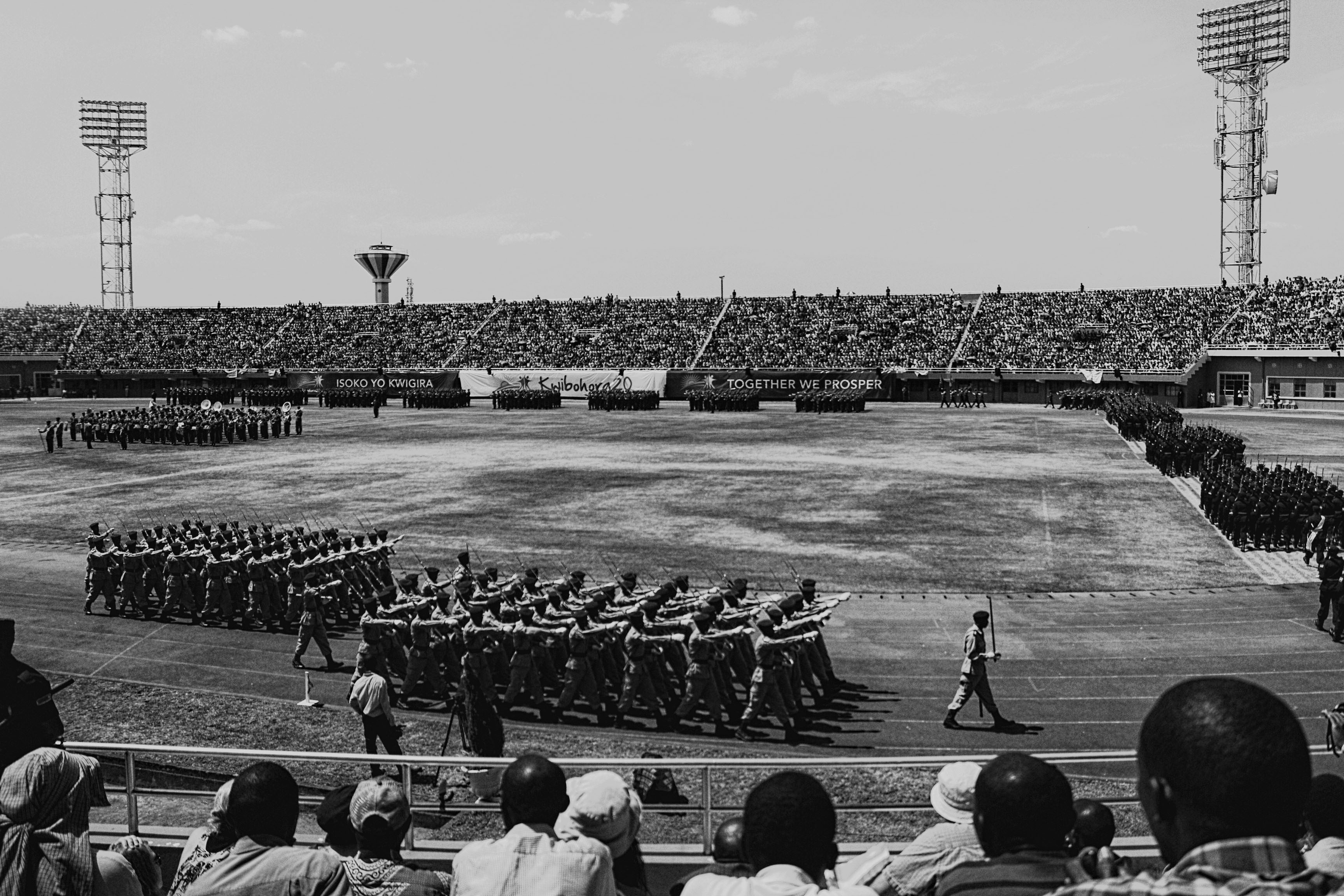
The military parade of the RDF during the Liberation Day celebrations in 2014.

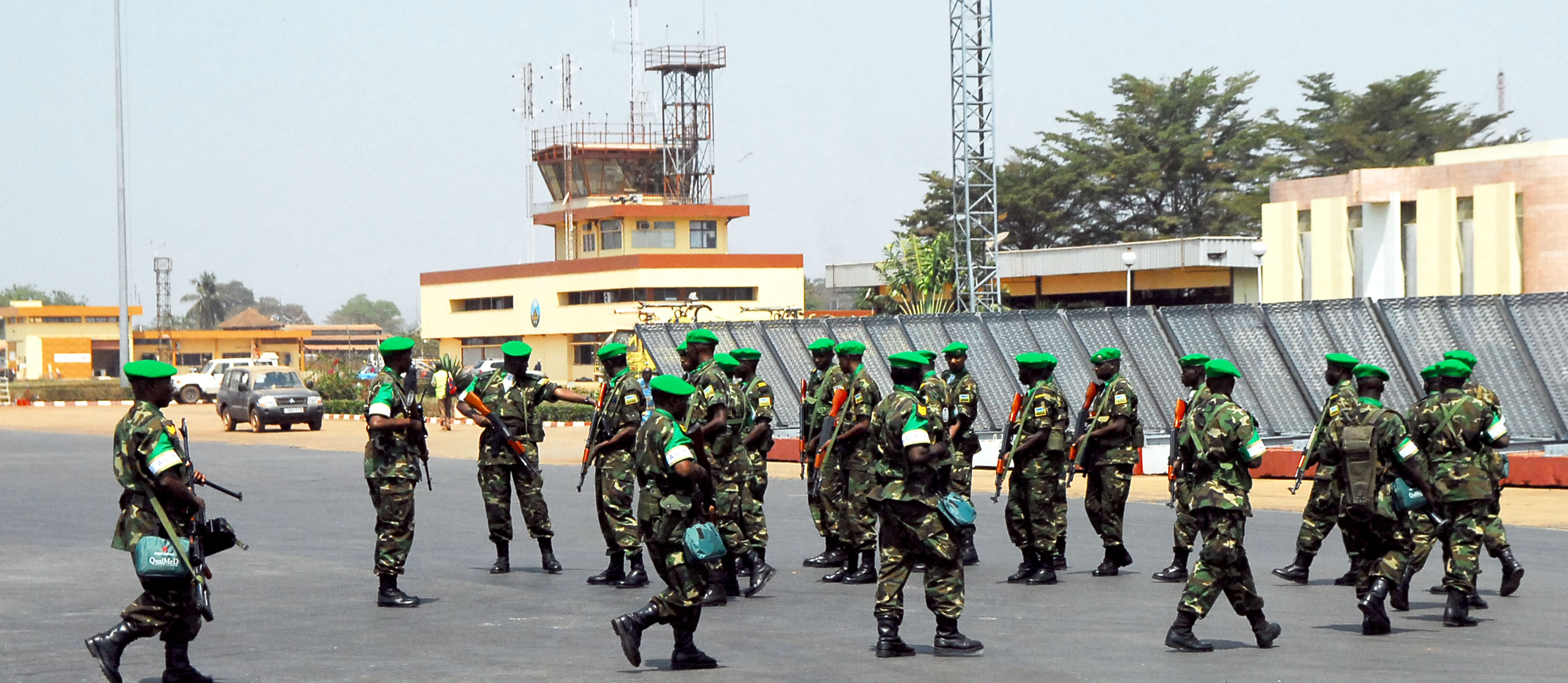
Members of the Rwanda Defense Force move into formation after arriving in Bangui, Central African Republic (CAR), 16 January 2014 140116-A-ZZ999-007

Despite not being a former British colony, Rwanda has generally used British foot drill during official parades and functions. Since 2019, however, the RDF has adopted the Chinese variant of the goosestep, which is today mostly used by countries in Central and Eastern Europe, by communist countries, as well as by countries with a large Prussian/German influence (Russia, China and Chile all being examples of each). It was first displayed in April during the military parade in honor of the Rwandan genocide's silver jubilee on Liberation Day, in which over 1,500 RDF soldiers and policemen trained by six members of the Beijing Garrison Honor Guard Battalion of the People's Liberation Army's Central Theater Command marched while using the goosestep. Mandarin parade commands are used, such as "Look to the right!" to which the soldiers respond with "One! Two!", which is done similarly in the PLA honor guard. Prior to this, only the rebels utilized the goosestep during the Civil War, as they received military training in the neighboring country of Uganda, which uses the goosestep.

=== RDF Band ===
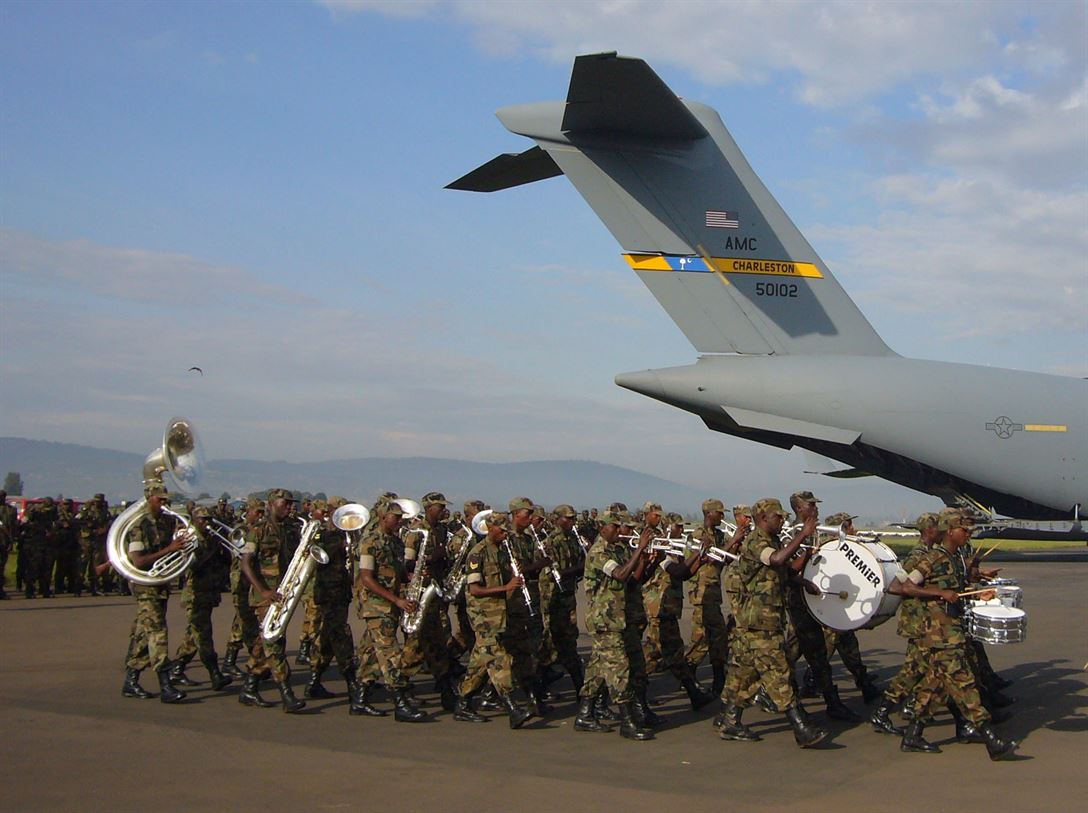
The RDF Band.

The Rwanda Defence Forces Army Band is the military band of the RDF. The RDF Band was founded in 1992 during the Rwandan Civil War and gave its first performance on 8 March 1992. After the war, it was re-established with 46 members. Although it represents the defence forces, it falls under the command of the Land Forces.

== Bibliography ==
- Cooper, Tom, Africa@War Volume 14: Great Lakes Conflagration, The Second Congo War, 1998–2003, Helion & Co Ltd, England, 2013.
- Dallaire, Lt. Gen. Romeo, Shake Hands with the Devil: The Failure of Humanity in Rwanda, Random House of Canada Ltd, Toronto, 2003.
- Des Forges, Alison, 'Leave None to Tell the Story,' Human Rights Watch, March 1999, ISBN 1-56432-171-1
- Fontanellaz, Adrien & Cooper, Tom, Africa@War Volume 24: The Rwandan Patriotic Front 1990–1994, Helion & Co Ltd, England, and Thirty Degrees South Publishers Pty Ltd, Johannesburg, 2015.
- The Military Balance 2016. Routledge. 2016. ISBN 978-1-85743-835-2.
- Lemarchand, René (1970). Rwanda and Burundi. New York: Praeger Publishers. OCLC 254366212.
- Nyrop, Richard F., Brenneman, Lyle E., Hibbs, Roy V., James, Charlene A., MacKnight, Susan & McDonald, Gordon C., Army Area Handbook for Rwanda, U.S. Government Printing Office, 1969. Research and writing completed 1 April 1969.
- Orth, Rick (former United States Army attaché in Rwanda), Rwanda's Hutu Extremist genocidal Insurgency: An Eyewitness Perspective, Small Wars & Insurgencies, Volume 12, Number 1, Spring 2001.
- Prunier, Gerard, From Genocide to Continental War: The "Congolese" Conflict and the Crisis of Contemporary Africa, C. Hurst & Co, 2009. ISBN 978-1-85065-523-7
