= Dongo conflict =

Conflict in the DRC

Coordinates: 2°42′N 18°24′E

Date	30 October – 13 December 2009
Location	Dongo, Democratic Republic of the Congo

Belligerents
Lobala rebels; Possibly: Resistance Patriots of Dongo	Democratic Republic of the Congo; Supported by: (United Nations) MONUC; Rwanda (alleged)

Commanders and leaders
Udjani Mangbama; Ambroise Lobala Mokobe	Joseph Kabila

Casualties and losses
- ~100 killed in total 168,000 civilians displaced

The Dongo conflict was a minor conflict centered in the town of Dongo, on the left bank of the Ubangi River in Sud-Ubangi District, Democratic Republic of the Congo. Violence initially broke out in late October 2009 after a local dispute over fishing rights. This destabilised the region and led to a spiral of violence, and an exodus of civilians attempting to flee from the fighting. By December 2009, this conflict was one of the biggest conflicts of the United Nations Mission in the Democratic Republic of Congo (MONUC) and the United Nations; more than 168,000 people had fled their homes, many of them crossing into the neighbouring Republic of the Congo. An intervention by the Congolese army and MONUC brought the conflict to an end by 13 December 2009.

== Violence ==
Sud-Ubangi Province, DRC

=== Initial attacks ===
Dongo is a small town on the Ubangi River in the Democratic Republic of the Congo on its frontier with the Republic of the Congo. The conflict at Dongo began in July 2009 with a dispute over the ownership of fish ponds claimed by people from Enyele and Monzaya villages which had been disputed since 1946. In the confrontation, seven policemen were killed and ethnic tensions increased. By 5 November 2009 at least 16,000 civilians had fled to the neighbouring Republic of the Congo (ROC) and Dongo had become a ghost town.

=== Escalation ===
Further to the south, in Saba-Saba and in the Bomboma area, new fighting started on 17 November and the residents and the refugees from Dongo had to flee. The refugees included members of the Congolese navy, which patrols the Ubangi River; they had to flee with their families because they had neither weapons nor ammunition to protect themselves. More clashes occurred in the village of Buburo on 20 November. Although the inhabitants had already fled, the attackers destroyed the houses there, including the UNHCR offices, which had also earlier evacuated its staff. By 30 November 2009 more than 70,000 people had been displaced. About half of the displaced remained in DRC, taking temporary shelter in locations such as Kungu, Bokonzi, Bomboma and Bonzene. The rest of the displaced crossed the Ubangi River into ROC.

The unrest was led by an animist priest called Udjani whose followers apparently included former members of the Movement for the Liberation of Congo led by Jean-Pierre Bemba which fought the Congolese government during the Second Congo War (1998–2003). Udjani's supporters patrolled the Ubangi river, shooting at barges filled with people trying to escape. By 10 December the conflict had left 100 dead and forced 115,000 people to flee their homes, two thirds of them into the Republic of the Congo, according to the UNHCR. Amid growing violence, the creation of an anti-government rebel group called the "Resistance Patriots of Dongo" (Patriotes-Résistants de Dongo) was declared by Ambroise Lobala Mokobe but appears to have had little presence on the ground.

The United Nations Mission in the Democratic Republic of Congo (MONUC) rushed peacekeeping troops to Dongo in an effort to protect the local population. First peace keepers to reach Dongo were a MILOB team led by Maj Sankha Jayamaha (Sri Lanka Army) from Gemina team site with some Ghana peace keepers to provide real time information and to compromise the prevailing situation. Peace keepers were able to reached to Dongo and also were able to facilitate UN official to reach Dongo by heli by making favorable and safe atmosphere. after some days a MONUC helicopter that was restocking the 20 troops stationed came under gunfire from armed men. The helicopter crew, all of Russian nationality, evacuated 25 people, including five injured people who were taken to Brazzaville for emergency medical treatment.

=== Recapture of Dongo ===
The Congolese army (FARDC) recaptured Dongo on 13 December. According to the Congolese press among the rebels who had captured several towns in the area were former soldiers of the Congolese army, deserters, and former members of the Zairean army who had sought refuge in ROC.

At the weekly MONUC press conference of 16 December 2009, it was announced by MONUC spokesperson Madnodje Mounoubai that the first MONUC peacekeeping troops were deployed in Dongo, as well as in nearby Bozene. The 500 MONUC troops consisted of soldiers from the Ghanaian, Tunisian and Egyptian contingents as well as troops from the Guatemalan Special Forces. Military equipment such as armored personnel carriers, transport and combat helicopters were also at their disposal to support their mission.

== Refugee crisis ==
The crisis in Dongo led to an exodus of the civilian population, first due to the advance of the rebels and then due to the counter-attacks of the army. Humanitarian agencies faced major logistical obstacles since refugees were spread across an area of 500 km^{2} along the banks of the Ubangi River. With its local staff, the UNHCR has supported the creation of nine clinics around the highest concentration of refugees, where there is a greater need for medicines and medical staff. There are also mobile medical centers for remote areas. Humanitarian agencies also installed six large water tanks with a total capacity of 60,000 litres near Bétou in the northern Republic of Congo, about 40 kilometres (25 mi) north of Dongo. By 22 December, the number of refugees was estimated to be 168,000.
