= Dongo, Democratic Republic of the Congo =

Dongo
- Location in Democratic Republic of the Congo
- Coordinates: 2°42′N 18°24′E
- Country: DR Congo
- Province: Sud-Ubangi
- Territory: Kungu
- Time zone: UTC+1 (West Africa Time)

Dongo is a town in the Kungu territory of Sud-Ubangi province, Democratic Republic of the Congo. Dongo was caught up in a conflict known as the Dongo conflict. During the conflict over 168,000 people fled their homes into other parts of the Congo Basin and neighboring Republic of the Congo. It lies on the northwestern border with the Republic of Congo, on the Oubangui river, in Equateur province.

== See also ==
- Dongo conflict
